= List of Coreidae genera =

As of 2024, the following subfamilies and genera are recognised in the bug family Coreidae:

== List ==
Coreinae Leach, 1815

- Acanonicus Westwood, 1842
- Acanthocephala Laporte, 1833
- Acanthocerus Palisot de Beauvois, 1818
- Acanthocoris Amyot & Serville, 1843
- Acroelytrum Mayr, 1865
- Acantholybas Breddin, 1899
- Acanthotyla Stål, 1873
- Acarihygia Brailovsky, 1993
- Acidomeria Stål, 1870
- Agathyrna Stål, 1861
- Amorbus Dallas, 1852
- Agriopocodemus Brailovsky & Cassis, 1999
- Agriopocoris Miller, 1954
- Agriopocoscelis Brailovsky & Cassis, 1999
- Agriopocostella Brailovsky & Cassis, 1999
- Allocara Bergroth, 1894
- Althos Kirkaldy, 1904
- Amblyomia Stål, 1870
- Amblypelta Stål, 1873
- Amygdonia Schouteden, 1938
- Anhomoeus Hsiao, 1963
- Anadasynus China, 1934
- Anasa Amyot & Serville, 1843
- Anisoscelis Latreille, 1829
- Anomalopetalops Brailovsky, 2021
- Anoplocnemis Stål, 1873
- Antanambecoris Brailovsky, 2001
- Antipetalops Brailovsky, 2021
- Arioge Stål, 1868
- Aschistocoris Bergroth, 1909
- Ashlockhygia Brailovsky & Ortega Leon, 1994
- Aspilosterna Stål, 1873
- Astacops Boisduval, 1835
- Astygiton Berg, 1883
- Athaumastus Mayr, 1865
- Aulacosterjanus Brailovsky, 2002
- Aulacosternum Dallas, 1852
- Aurelianus Distant, 1902
- Baldus Stål, 1868
- Ballhygia Brailovsky & Ortega Leon, 1994
- Barreratalpa Brailovsky, 1988
- Baumannhygia Brailovsky, 1996
- Bellamynacoris Brailovsky, 1997
- Belonomus Uhler, 1869
- Bermejanus Brailovsky, 2018
- Beutelspacoris Brailovsky, 1987
- Brachylybas Stål, 1871
- Brachylybastella Brailovsky, 1995
- Brachytes Westwood, 1842
- Breddinella Dispons, 1962
- Brotheolus Bergroth, 1908
- Brulecoris Brailovsky, 2015
- Brunsellius Distant, 1902
- Bulbocornis Brailovsky & Barrera, 2022
- Buruhygia Brailovsky, 1993
- Callichlamydia Stål, 1873
- Calyptohygia Brailovsky, 1998
- Camptischium Amyot & Serville, 1843
- Canungrantmictis Brailovsky, 2002
- Carayonhygia Brailovsky, 2002
- Carlisis Stål, 1858
- Carvalhygia Brailovsky, 1995
- Catorhintha Stål, 1860
- Cebrenis Stål, 1862
- Cebreniscella Brailovsky, 1995
- Cebrenistella Brailovsky, 1995
- Centrocoris Kolenati, 1845
- Centroplax Horváth, 1932
- Cephalohygia Brailovsky, 2004
- Ceratopachys Westwood, 1842
- Cercinthinus Kiritshenko, 1916
- Cercinthus Stål, 1860
- Cervantistellus Brailovsky & Barrera, 2005
- Chariesterus Laporte, 1832
- Chelinidea Uhler, 1863
- Chinadasynus Hsiao, 1964
- Choerommatus Amyot & Serville, 1843
- Chondrocera Laporte, 1832
- Cimolus Stål, 1862
- Cipia Stål, 1866
- Cleotopetalops Brailovsky, 1999
- Cletoliturus Brailovsky, 2011
- Cletomorpha Mayr, 1866
- Cletoscellus Brailovsky, 2011
- Cletus Stål, 1860
- Cloresmus Stål, 1860
- Cneius Stål, 1866
- Cnemomis Stål, 1860
- Cnemyrtus Stål, 1860
- Collatia Stål, 1862
- Cordysceles Hsiao, 1963
- Coreus Fabricius, 1794
- Coribergia Casini, 1984
- Coryzoplatus Spinola, 1837
- Cossutia Stål, 1866
- Crinocerus Burmeister, 1835
- Cryptopetalops Brailovsky, 2021
- Ctenomelynthus Breddin, 1903
- Curtius Stål, 1870
- Dalader Amyot & Serville, 1843
- Daladeropsis Karsch, 1894
- Dalensocoris Brailovsky, 2015
- Dalmatomammurius Brailovsky, 1982
- Daphnasa Brailovsky, 1984
- Dasynopsis Hsiao, 1963
- Dasynus Burmeister, 1834
- Derepteryx White, 1839
- Dersagrena Kirkaldy, 1904
- Diactor Perty, 1830
- Dianomictis O'Shea, 1980
- Dicorymbus Bergroth, 1918
- Dilycochtha Karsch, 1895
- Diocles Stål, 1866
- Discogaster Burmeister, 1835
- Ditora Schouteden, 1938
- Dollingocoris O'Shea, 1980
- Elachisme Kirkaldy, 1904
- Elasmocnema Karsch, 1892
- Elasmocniella Brailovsky, 2011
- Elasmogaster Stål, 1854
- Elasmopoda Stål, 1873
- Eldarca Signoret, 1864
- Eludohygia Brailovsky, 1996
- Empedocles Stål, 1868
- Encedonia Stål, 1868
- Enoplops Amyot & Serville, 1843
- Eretmophora Stein, 1860
- Euagona Dallas, 1852
- Eubule Stål, 1868
- Euthochtha Mayr, 1865
- Fracastorius Distant, 1902
- Fumua Schouteden, 1912
- Galaesus Dallas, 1852
- Gelonus Stål, 1866
- Golema Amyot & Serville, 1843
- Gonocerus Berthold, 1827
- Grammopoecilus Stål, 1868
- Grosshygia Brailovsky, 1993
- Grosshygioides Brailovsky, 1993
- Guilbertocoris Brailovsky & Barrera, 2016
- Haidara Distant, 1908
- Haglundina Schouteden, 1938
- Halohygia Brailovsky & Barrera, 2004
- Haploprocta Stål, 1872
- Heisshygia Brailovsky, 1993
- Helcomeria Stål, 1873
- Heydonhygia Brailovsky & Barrera, 2005
- Himella Dallas, 1852
- Holhymenia Lepeletier & Serville, 1825
- Homalocolpura Breddin, 1900
- Homoeocerus Burmeister, 1835
- Hormambogaster Karsch, 1892
- Hygia Uhler, 1861
- Hypselonotus Hahn, 1833
- Ichilocoris Brailovsky & Barrera, 2001
- Jalina Distant, 1911
- Jalinoides Dolling, 1974
- Junodis Van Reenen, 1976
- Kalinckascelis Brailovsky, 1990
- Karnaviexallis Brailovsky, 1984
- Kekihygia Brailovsky, 1994
- Kennetus Distant, 1904
- Kerzhnercryptes Brailovsky, 2002
- Kerzhnerhygia Brailovsky, 1993
- Kinabaluhygia Brailovsky, 1996
- Kolleriella Schouteden, 1938
- Kormijirania Brailovsky & Cassis, 1999
- Kurnaina Distant, 1911
- Kurrajongia Brailovsky & Monteith, 1998
- Lacrimascellus Brailovsky, 2015
- Laminiceps Costa, 1863
- Latimbus Stål, 1860
- Leptoglossus Guérin-Méneville, 1831 – conifer seed bugs
- Leptopelios Brailovsky, 2001
- Leptoscelis Laporte, 1833
- Leptostellana Brailovsky, 1997
- Leptopetalops Breddin, 1901
- Liaspis Bergroth, 1894
- Lobogonius Stål, 1871
- Lothygia Brailovsky, 1994
- Lucullia Stål, 1865
- Lupanthus Stål, 1860
- Lybindus Stål, 1860
- Lygaeopharus Stål, 1871
- Machtima Amyot & Serville, 1843
- Madagalaesus Brailovsky, 2007
- Malvana Stål, 1865
- Malvanaioides Brailovsky, 1990
- Mamurius Stål, 1862
- Manocoreus Hsiao, 1964
- Mecocnemis Hsiao, 1964
- Melucha Amyot & Serville, 1843
- Meluchamixia Brailovsky, 1987
- Meluchopetalops Breddin, 1903
- Menenotus Laporte, 1832
- Mercennus Distant, 1904
- Microbasis Dallas, 1852
- Mictiopsis Hsiao, 1965
- Mictis Leach, 1814
- Mirabilamorbus Brailovsky, 2001
- Missimhygia Brailovsky, 1993
- Molchina Amyot & Serville, 1843
- Molipteryx Kiritshenko, 1916
- Moronopelios Brailovsky, 1988
- Monasavuhygia Brailovsky, 1996
- Mozena Amyot & Serville, 1843
- Murtula Schouteden, 1912
- Mygdonia Stål, 1866
- Myrrhina Linnavuori, 1973
- Namacus Amyot & Serville, 1843
- Narnia Stål, 1862
- Neaira Linnavuori, 1973
- Nectoquintius Brailovsky & Barrera, 2002
- Nematopus Berthold, 1827
- Neohalohygia Brailovsky & Barrera, 2004
- Neomictis O'Shea & Schaefer, 1980
- Neoquintius Brailovsky & Barrera, 1986
- Neosciophyrus Brailovsky, 2003
- Neotrematocoris Ahmad, 1979
- Nepiohygia Brailovsky, 2003
- Nirovecus Stål, 1860
- Nishihygia Brailovsky, 2000
- Nisoscolopocerus Barber, 1928
- Notobitiella Hsiao, 1963
- Notobitopsis Blöte, 1938
- Notobitus Stål, 1860
- Notopteryx Hsiao, 1963
- Nyttum Spinola, 1837
- Oannes Distant, 1911
- Ochrochira Stål, 1873
- Odontobola Stål, 1873
- Odontocurtus Brailovsky, 2011
- Odontoparia Mayr, 1865
- Odontorhopala Stål, 1873
- Omanocoris Kiritshenko, 1916
- Onoremia Brailovsky, 1995
- Ornytus Dallas, 1852
- Oxypristis Signoret, 1861
- Ouranion Kirkaldy, 1904
- Pachycolpura Breddin, 1900
- Pachycolpuroides Brailovsky, 1993
- Pachylis Le Peletier & Serville, 1825
- Panstronhygia Brailovsky & Barrera, 2000
- Papeocoris Brailovsky, 2002
- Papuamorbus Brailovsky, 2006
- Parabrachytes Distant, 1879
- Paradasynus China, 1934
- Parypheroides Brailovsky & Barrera, 2020
- Paryphes Burmeister, 1835
- Pephricus Amyot & Serville, 1843
- Petalocnemis Stål, 1854
- Petalops Amyot & Serville, 1843
- Petalopus Kirby, 1828
- Petascelis Signoret, 1847
- Petascelisca Distant, 1881
- Petersitocoris Brailovsky, 1990
- Petersitocoroides Brailovsky, 1992
- Petillia Stål, 1865
- Petillocoris Hsiao, 1963
- Petillopsis Hsiao, 1963
- Phelaus Stål, 1866
- Phthia Stål, 1862
- Phthiacnemia Brailovsky, 2009
- Phthiadema Brailovsky, 2009
- Phthiarella Brailovsky, 2009
- Phyllogonia Stål, 1873
- Phyllomorpha Laporte 1833
- Physomerus Burmeister, 1835
- Piezogaster Amyot & Serville, 1843
- Piramurana Distant, 1911
- Piramuranoides Dolling, 1974
- Plapigus Stål, 1860
- Plaxiscelis Spinola, 1837
- Plectropoda Bergroth, 1894
- Plectropodoides Schouteden, 1938
- Plinachtus Stål, 1860
- Plunentis Stål, 1860
- Pluotenia Brailovsky, 2001
- Pomponatius Distant, 1904
- Postleniatus Brailovsky, 2007
- Priocnemicoris Costa, 1863
- Prionolomia Stål, 1873
- Prionolomiopsis O'Shea, 1980
- Prionotylus Fieber, 1860
- Prismatocerus Amyot & Serville, 1843
- Procamptus Bergroth, 1925
- Pseudomictis Hsiao, 1963
- Pseudopendulinus Schouteden, 1938
- Pseudophelaus Schouteden, 1938
- Pseudotheraptus Brown, 1955
- Pternistria Stål, 1873
- Ptyctus Stål, 1873
- Puppeia Stål, 1866
- Quintius Stål, 1865
- Raunothryallis Faúndez, 2016
- Rhamnomia Hsiao, 1963
- Rhombolaparus Bergroth, 1906
- Rhyticoris Costa, 1863
- Rhytidophthia Brailovsky, 2009
- Riedelhygia Brailovsky & Barrera, 2005
- Rochrosoma Reed, 1899
- Rondoneva Brailovsky & Barrera, 2003
- Ruckesius Yonke, 1972
- Sagotylus Mayr, 1865
- Saguntus Stål, 1865
- Salapia Stål, 1865
- Salgohygia Brailovsky & Barrera, 2004
- Savius Stål, 1862
- Scamurius Stål, 1860
- Schaeferhygia Brailovsky & Ortega Leon, 1994
- Schaeferocoris O'Shea, 1980
- Sephinioides Brailovsky, 1996
- Schroederia Schmidt, 1911
- Schuhgaster Brailovsky, 1993
- Schwetzia Schouteden, 1938
- Sciophyrella Brailovsky & Barrera, 1996
- Sciophyritides Brailovsky & Barrera, 1996
- Sciophyroides Brailovsky & Barrera, 1996
- Sciophyropsis Brailovsky & Barrera, 1996
- Sciophyrus Stål, 1873
- Scioriedeli Brailovsky, 2004
- Scolopocerus Uhler, 1875
- Sephina Amyot & Serville, 1843
- Sethenira Spinola, 1837
- Sibuyanhygia Brailovsky, 1997
- Sinodasynus Hsiao, 1963
- Sinotagus Kiritshenko, 1916
- Sohnhygia Brailovsky, 2003
- Spartocera Laporte, 1832
- Spathocera Stein, 1860
- Sphictyrtus Stål, 1860
- Spilopleura Stål, 1870
- Staluptus Stål, 1860
- Stenoeurilla Brailovsky & Barrera, 2012
- Stenometapodus Breddin, 1903
- Stenoprasia Horváth, 1913
- Stentoquintius Brailovsky & Barrera, 2002
- Stenoscelidea Westwood, 1842
- Stiroptus Stål, 1860
- Sulawsihygia Brailovsky, 2000
- Sulpicia Stål, 1866
- Sundarellus Brailovsky & Barrera, 2020
- Sundarus Amyot & Serville, 1843
- Syromastus Berthold, 1827
- Tachycolpura Breddin, 1900
- Tambourina Distant, 1911
- Tarpeius Stål, 1868
- Thasopsis O'Shea, 1980
- Thasus Stål, 1865
- Theraptus Stål, 1860
- Thlastocoris Mayr, 1866
- Thymetus Stål, 1868
- Tongorma Kirkaldy, 1900
- Tovarocoris Brailovsky, 1995
- Trallianus Distant, 1902
- Trematocoris Mayr, 1865
- Typhlocolpura Breddin, 1900
- Turrana Distant, 1911
- Tylocryptus Horváth, 1932
- Ugnius Stål, 1860
- Ullrihygia Brailovsky & Barrera, 2003
- Uranocoris Walker, 1871
- Vazquezitocoris Brailovsky, 1990
- Viklundocoris Brailovsky, 2002
- Villasitocoris Brailovsky, 1990
- Vittorius Distant, 1902
- Vivianadema Brailovsky, 1987
- Warishygia Brailovsky, 2003
- Wasbauerellus Brailovsky, 2007
- Weirhygia Brailovsky, 2001
- Wilcoxina O'Shea, 1980
- Wolfius Distant, 1902
- Woodwardhygia Brailovsky, 1993
- Wygohygia Brailovsky, 1993
- Xanthocolpura Breddin, 1900
- Xenoceraea Bergroth, 1918
- Xyrophoreus Breddin, 1909
- Yasunahygia Brailovsky, 2003
- Zenkeria Karsch, 1895
- Zicca Amyot & Serville, 1843
- Zoreva Amyot & Serville, 1843
- Zygometapodus Brailovsky, 2018

Hydarinae Stål, 1873

- Corduba Stål, 1862
- Eohydara Bergroth, 1925
- Hydara Dallas, 1852
- Hydarella Bergroth, 1925
- Hydarellamixia Brailovsky, 1988
- Hydaropsis Hsiao, 1965
- Hydascelis Brailovsky, 2010
- Madura Stål, 1860
- Maduranoides Brailovsky, 1988

Meropachyinae Stål, 1868

- Acocopus Stål, 1864
- Alcocerniella Brailovsky, 1999
- Allopeza Bergroth, 1912
- Badilloniella Brailovsky & Barrera, 2001
- Diariptus Stål, 1860
- Egerniella Brailovsky, 2000
- Esparzaniella Brailovsky & Barrera, 2001
- Flavius Stål, 1862
- Gracchus Stål, 1862
- Himellastella Brailovsky & Barrera, 1998
- Hirilcus Stål, 1862
- Juaristiella Brailovsky, 1999
- Larraldiella Brailovsky, 1999
- Lycambes Stål, 1862
- Marichisme Kirkaldy, 1904
- Merocoris Perty, 1833
- Meropachys Burmeister, 1835
- Meropalionellus Brailovsky, 2009
- Paralycambes Kormilev, 1954
- Peranthus Stål, 1868
- Possaniella Brailovsky, 1999
- Romoniella Brailovsky & Barrera, 2001
- Salamancaniella Brailovsky & Luna, 2000
- Serranoniella Brailovsky & Barrera, 2001
- Soteloniella Brailovsky, 1999
- Spathophora Amyot & Serville, 1843
- Zettelniella Brailovsky, 2009

Pseudophloeinae Stål, 1868

- Anoplocerus Kiritshenko, 1926
- Arenocoris Hahn, 1834
- Bathysolen Fieber, 1860
- Bothrostethus Fieber, 1860
- Ceraleptus Costa, 1847
- Clavigralla Spinola, 1837
- Clavigralloides Dolling, 1978
- Coriomeris Westwood, 1842
- Gralliclava Dolling, 1978
- Hoplolomia Stål, 1873
- Indolomia Dolling, 1986
- Loxocnemis Fieber, 1860
- Mevanidea Reuter, 1883
- Mevaniomorpha Reuter, 1883
- Microtelocerus Reuter, 1900
- Myla Stål, 1866
- Nemocoris Sahlberg, 1848
- Neomevaniomorpha Dolling, 1986
- Oncaspidia Stål, 1873
- Paramyla Linnavuori, 1971
- Pseudomyla Dolling, 1986
- Psilolomia Breddin, 1909
- Pungra Dolling, 1986
- Risbecocoris Izzard, 1949
- Strobilotoma Fieber, 1860
- Ulmicola Kirkaldy, 1909
- Urartucoris Putshkov, 1979
- Vilga Stål, 1860

Subfamily unassigned

- †Ferriantenna Cumming & Le Tirant, 2021
- †Magnusantenna Du & Chen, 2021
