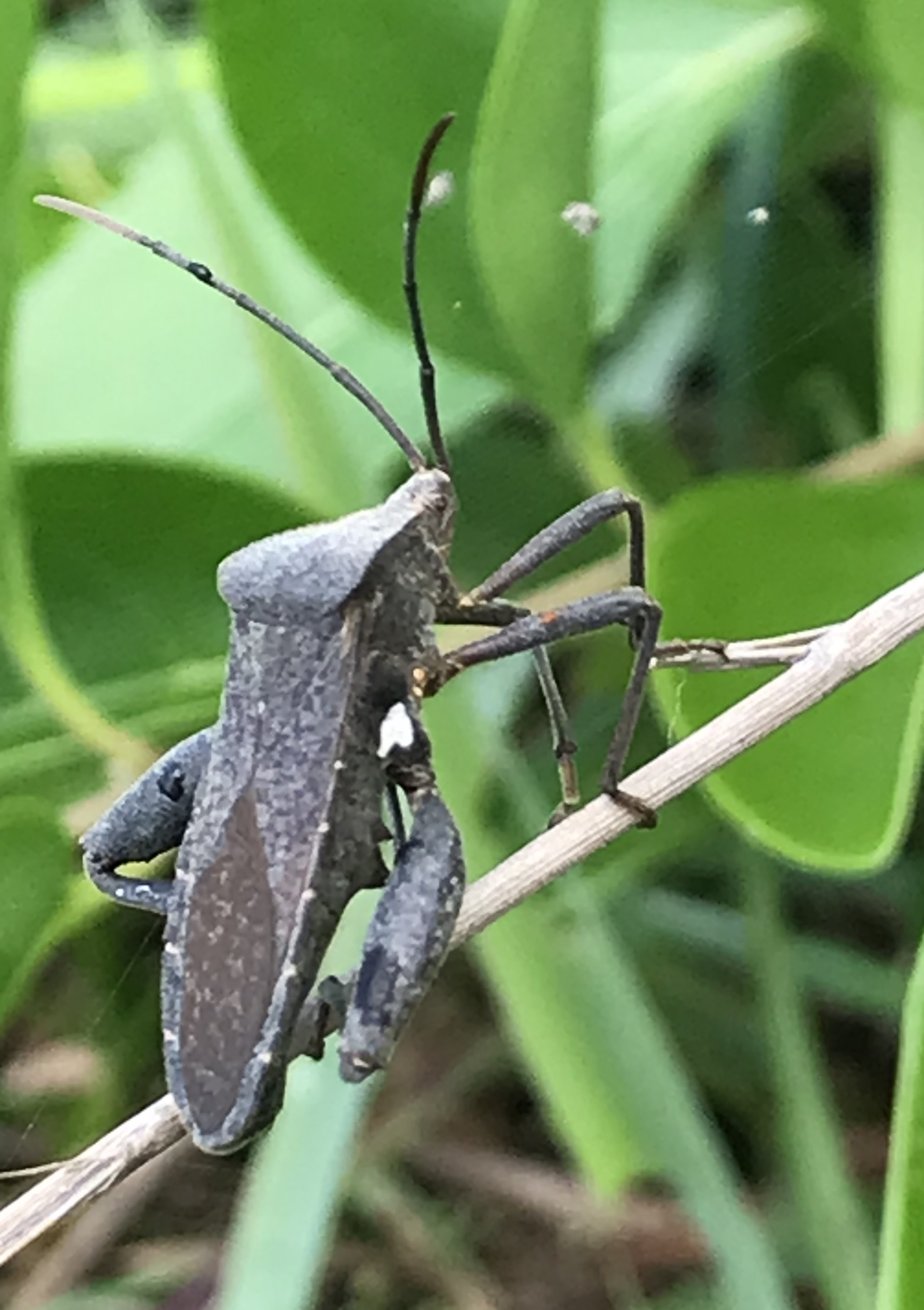
- Mictis tenebrosa

Scientific classification
- Domain: Eukaryota
- Kingdom: Animalia
- Phylum: Arthropoda
- Class: Insecta
- Order: Hemiptera
- Suborder: Heteroptera
- Family: Coreidae
- Subfamily: Coreinae
- Tribe: Mictini; Amyot & Serville, 1843

Synonyms
- Derepterini Hsiao, 1963; Helcomeriini Breddin, 1903; Mercennaria Bergroth, 1912; Mercennini Bergroth, 1912; Mictaria Amyot & Serville, 1843; Mictida Amyot & Serville, 1843; Mictidae Amyot & Serville, 1843; Mictiden, Mictides, Mictidida, Mictidinae, Mictidini, Mictiini, Mictina, Mictinae Amyot & Serville, 1843

= Mictini =

Tribe of true bugs

The Mictini are a tribe of leaf-footed bugs, in the subfamily Coreinae erected by Amyot & Serville (as the "Mictides") in 1843. Genera are distributed from Africa to South-East Asia.

== Genera ==
The Coreoidea Species File lists:

1. Allocara Bergroth, 1894
2. Amygdonia Schouteden, 1938
3. Anoplocnemis Stål, 1873
4. Aspilosterna Stål, 1873
5. Aurelianus Distant, 1902
6. Breddinella Dispons, 1962
7. Callichlamydia Stål, 1873
8. Canungrantmictis Brailovsky, 2002
9. Cipia Stål, 1866
10. Cossutia (bug) Stål, 1866
11. Derepteryx White, 1839
12. Dianomictis O'Shea, 1980
13. Ditora Schouteden, 1938
14. Dollingocoris O'Shea, 1980
15. Elasmocnema Karsch, 1892
16. Elasmocniella Brailovsky, 2011
17. Elasmopoda Stål, 1873
18. Fumua Schouteden, 1912
19. Haglundina Schouteden, 1938
20. Helcomeria Stål, 1873
21. Kennetus Distant, 1904
22. Kolleriella Schouteden, 1938
23. Mercennus Distant, 1904
24. Mictiopsis Hsiao, 1965
25. Mictis Leach, 1814
26. Molipteryx Kiritshenko, 1916
27. Mygdonia (bug) Stål, 1866
28. Myrrhina Linnavuori, 1973
29. Neaira Linnavuori, 1973
30. Neomictis O'Shea & Schaefer, 1980
31. Notobitopsis Blöte, 1938
32. Notopteryx Hsiao, 1963
33. Ochrochira Stål, 1873
34. Odontobola Stål, 1873
35. Phyllogonia Stål, 1873
36. Plectropoda Bergroth, 1894
37. Plectropodoides Schouteden, 1938
38. Prionolomia Stål, 1873
39. Prionolomiopsis O'Shea, 1980
40. Pseudomictis Hsiao, 1963
41. Pseudophelaus Schouteden, 1938
42. Pternistria Stål, 1873
43. Puppeia Stål, 1866
44. Raunothryallis Faúndez, 2016
45. Rhamnomia Hsiao, 1963
46. Schroederia (bug) Schmidt, 1911
47. Schwetzia Schouteden, 1938
48. Xyrophoreus Breddin, 1909
