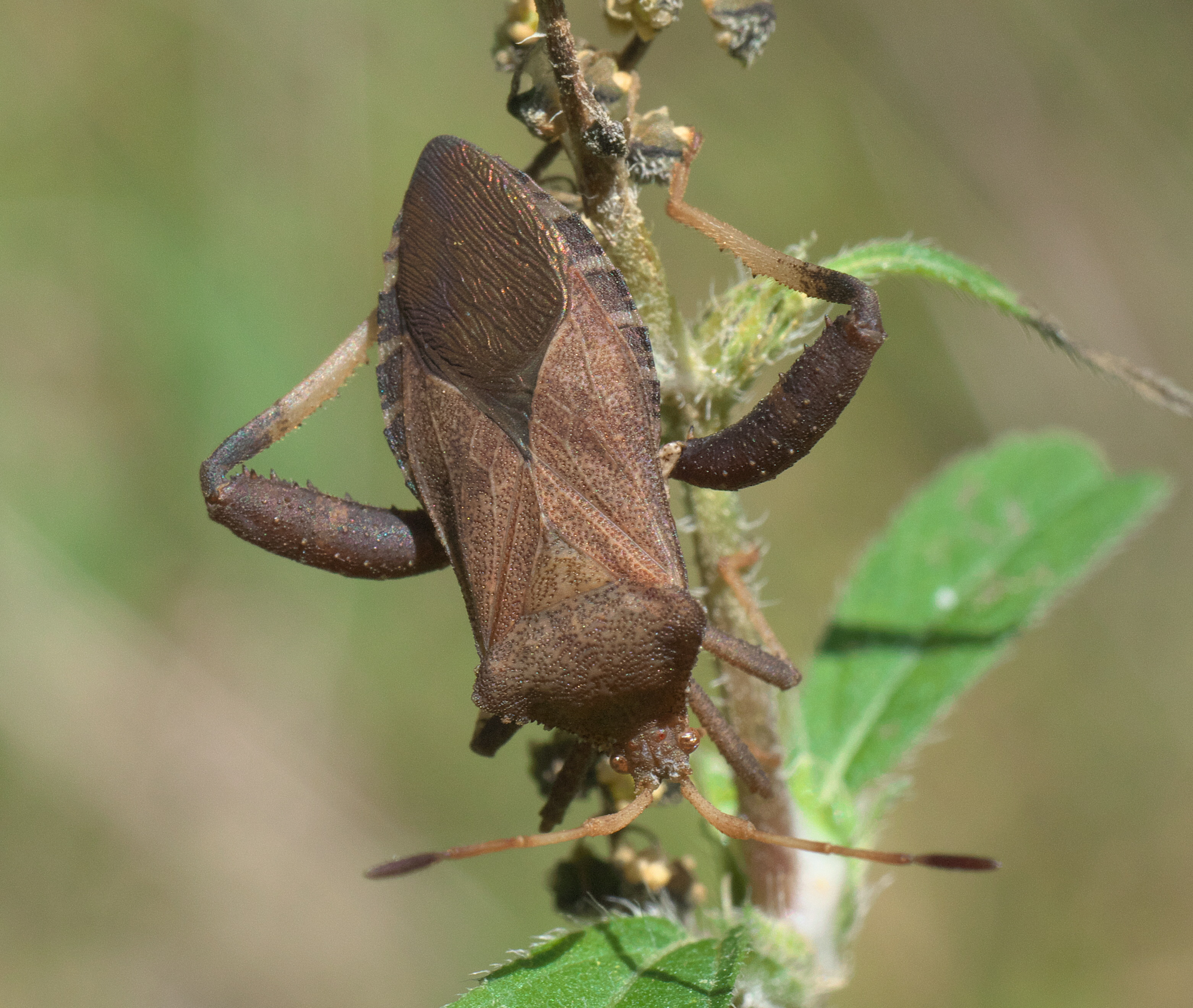
- Euthochtha galeator

Scientific classification
- Kingdom: Animalia
- Phylum: Arthropoda
- Class: Insecta
- Order: Hemiptera
- Suborder: Heteroptera
- Family: Coreidae
- Subfamily: Coreinae
- Tribe: Acanthocerini; Bergroth, 1913

= Acanthocerini =

Tribe of true bugs

Acanthocerini is a tribe of leaf-footed bugs in the family Coreidae. There are at least 20 genera and 50 described species in Acanthocerini.

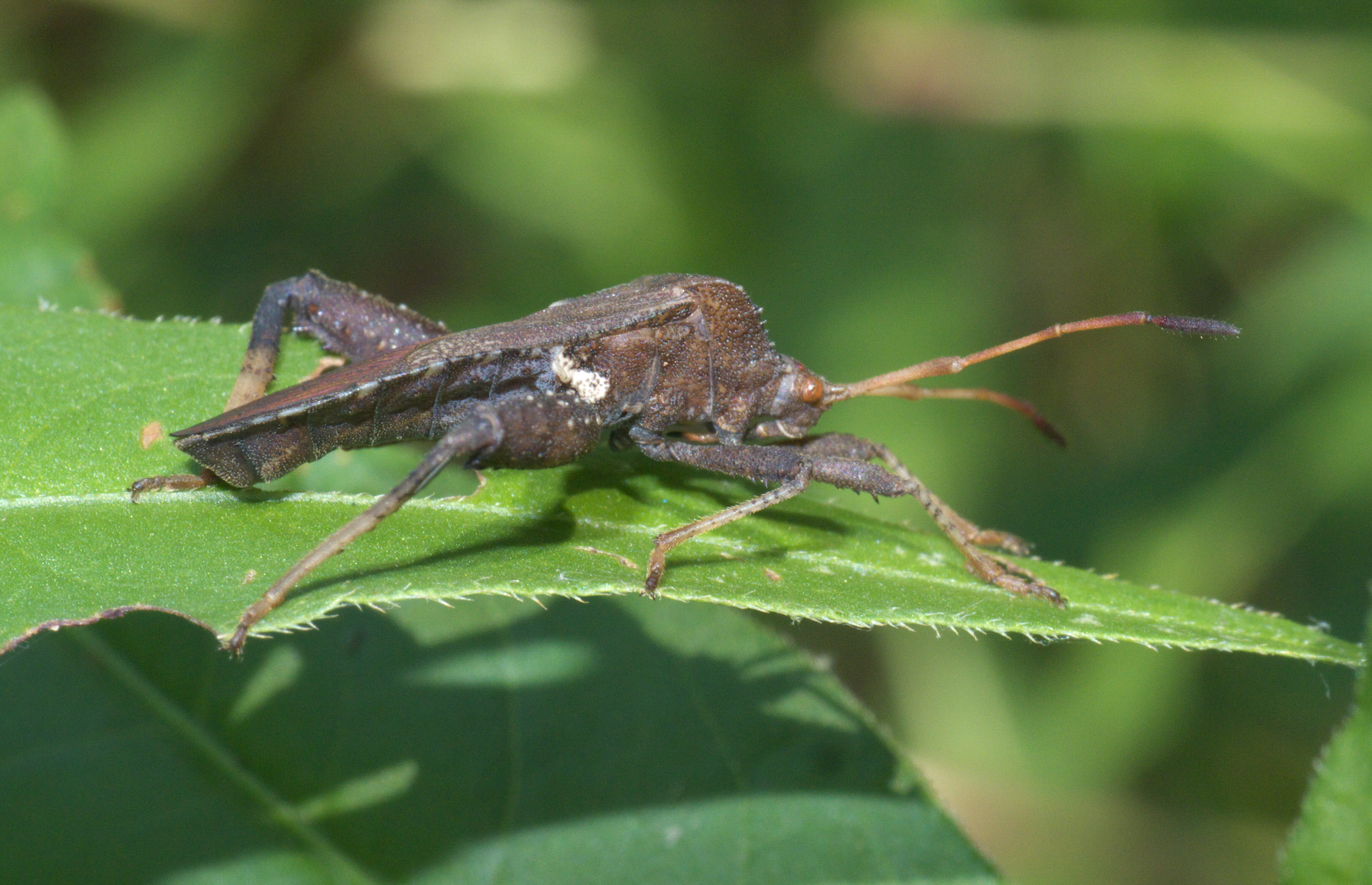
Euthochtha galeator

== Genera ==
These 20 genera belong to the tribe Acanthocerini:

- Acanthocerus Palisot de Beauvois, 1818^{i c g b}
- Athaumastus Mayr, 1865^{i c g}
- Beutelspacoris Brailovsky, 1987^{i c g}
- Brulecoris Brailovsky, 2015^{i c g}
- Camptischium Amyot and Serville, 1843^{i c g}
- Crinocerus Burmeister, 1835^{i c g}
- Dalensocoris Brailovsky, 2015^{i c g}
- Dersagrena Kirkaldy, 1904^{i c g}
- Elachisme Kirkaldy, 1904^{i c g}
- Euthochtha Mayr, 1865^{i c g b}
- Golema Amyot and Serville, 1843^{i c g}
- Lacrimascellus Brailovsky, 2015^{i c g}
- Lybindus Stål, 1859^{i c g}
- Machtima Amyot and Serville, 1843^{i c g}
- Moronopelios Brailovsky, 1988^{i c g}
- Rondoneva Brailovsky and Barrera, 2003^{i c g}
- Sagotylus Mayr, 1865^{i c g b}
- Schaeferocoris O'Shea, 1980^{i c g}
- Thlastocoris Mayr, 1866^{i c g}
- Zoreva Amyot and Serville, 1843^{i c g}

Data sources: i = ITIS, c = Catalogue of Life, g = GBIF, b = Bugguide.net
