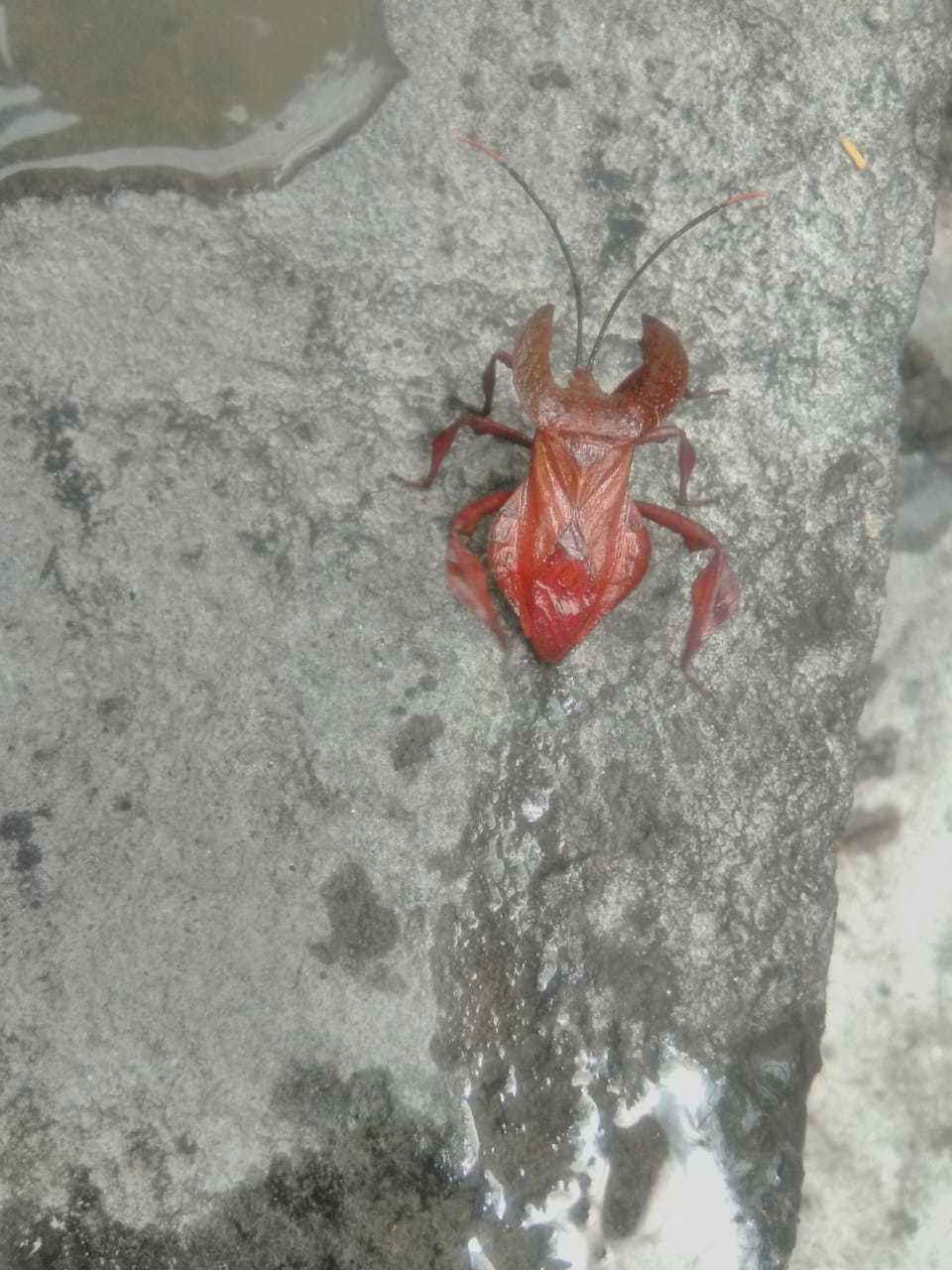

Scientific classification
- Domain: Eukaryota
- Kingdom: Animalia
- Phylum: Arthropoda
- Class: Insecta
- Order: Hemiptera
- Suborder: Heteroptera
- Family: Coreidae
- Genus: Derepteryx
- Species: D. grayii

Binomial name
- Derepteryx grayii White, A. (1839) - description of two Hemipterous insects. Magazine of Natural History, 3, 537–542

= Derepteryx grayii =

Cerbus

Species of insect

Derepteryx grayii, commonly known as the Cerberus bug, is a species of squash bugs belonging to the subfamily Coreinae. They are found in the Oriental region. According to some sources Derepteryx is the older name, dating back to 1839, while Molipteryx was proposed in 1979. They both are differ in some morphological features, such as the shape of the head and pronotum.

== Etymology ==
The genus was named from the "winged" neck, Derepteryx; the species being D. grayii, of a brown colour, the thorax rough with tubercles.

== Description ==
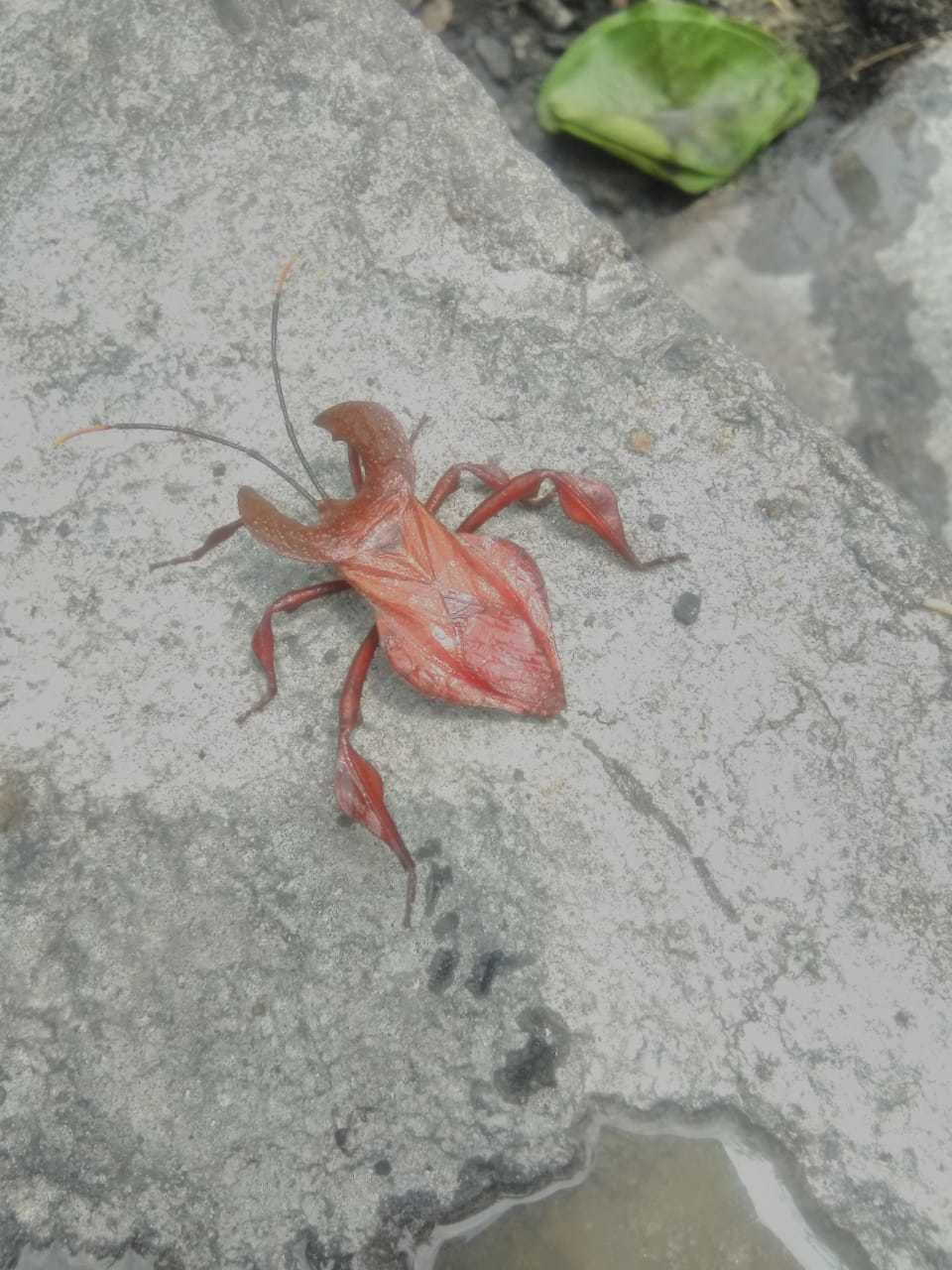

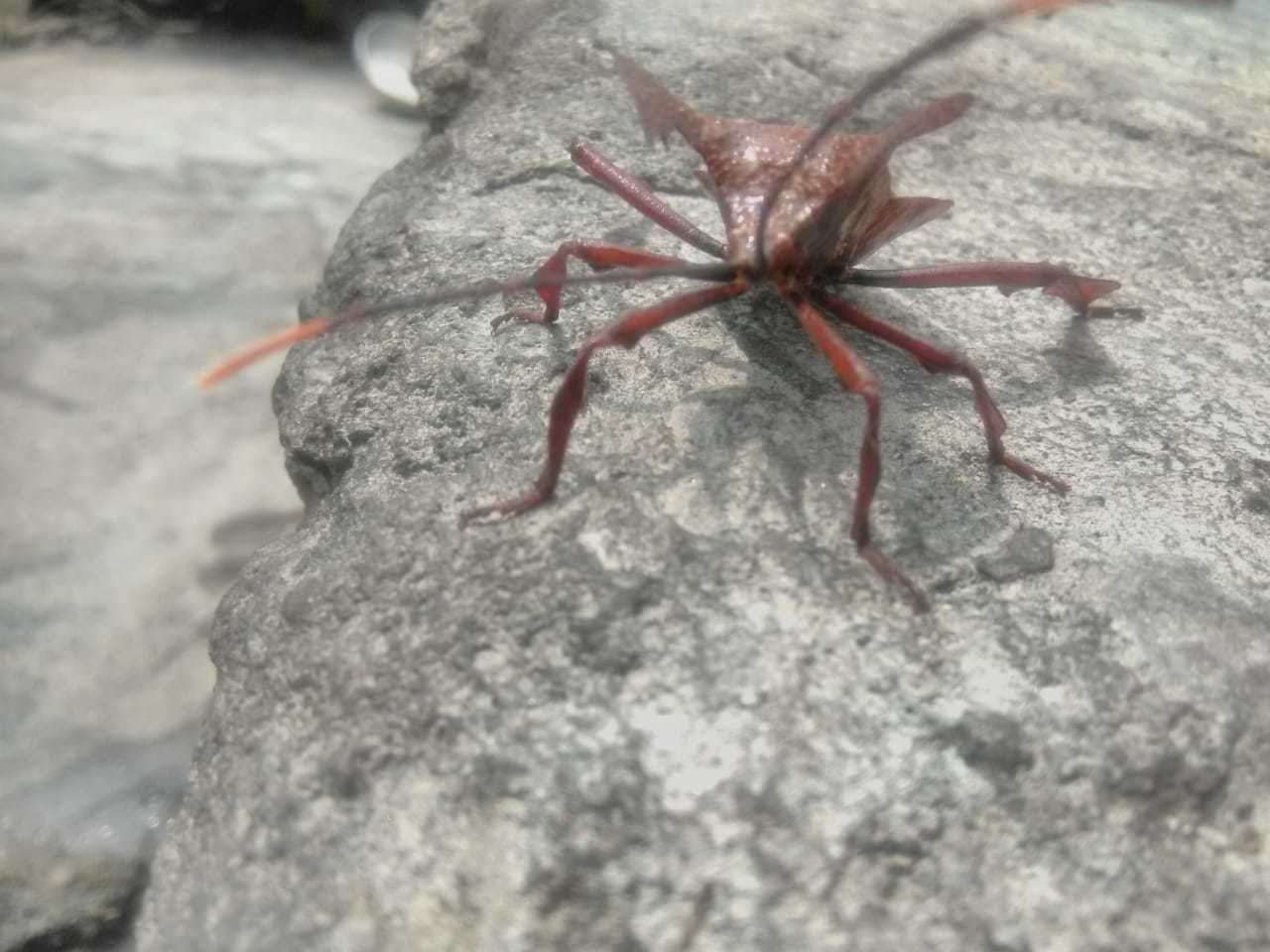

Derepteryx grayii has a rounded head with a short rostrum that barely reaches the fore coxae. It also has a convex pronotum with a shallow longitudinal groove in the middle. The lateral dilation of the thorax is bent forward and upward like Molipteryx hardwickii but the difference is in the proportions of the joints of the antennae, the basal joints being the longest, the second, third, and fourth differing but little in length, the last slightly bent, and in the veining of the hemelytra. The scutellum is rounded and the hemelytra are reddish-brown with black spots. The femora in both sexes is more or less thick ended. Unlike Molipteryx hardwickii the tibia is dilated in Cerbus.

== Range ==
Mostly reported in near Himalayan states like Nepal and Uttarakhand, India.
