= Gelonus (bug) =

Scientific classification
- Kingdom: Animalia
- Phylum: Arthropoda
- Clade: Pancrustacea
- Class: Insecta
- Order: Hemiptera
- Suborder: Heteroptera
- Family: Coreidae
- Subfamily: Coreinae
- Tribe: Amorbini
- Genus: Gelonus; Stål, 1865

Genus of true bugs

Gelonus is a genus of leaf-footed bugs (Coreidae) in Tasmania, one of the few Coreidae that feeds on eucalypts. It is a member of the tribe Amorbini, but has only a single species, Gelonus tasmanicus (Le Guillou, 1841).

Although this Tasmanian leaf-footed bug was first described in 1841 by Élie Jean François Le Guillou as Syromastes tasmanicus, it wasn't until 1873 that Carl Stål placed it in his newly formed genus Gelonus, as Gelonus tasmanicus. Stål created the genus Gelonus in 1865 in volume two of his three volume Hemiptera Africana. The following year he categorized the type species of the genus as Gelonus discolor, the bug described by William Dallas in 1852 as Amorbus discolor. In 1873, Stål established the synonymity of the two species, with Gelonus discolor being the junior synonym, and le Guillon's Gelonus tasmanicus the senior.

== See also ==
- International Code of Zoological Nomenclature
