= Acanthocerus =

Scientific classification
- Domain: Eukaryota
- Kingdom: Animalia
- Phylum: Arthropoda
- Class: Insecta
- Order: Hemiptera
- Suborder: Heteroptera
- Family: Coreidae
- Subfamily: Coreinae
- Tribe: Acanthocerini
- Genus: Acanthocerus; Palisot de Beauvois, 1818

Genus of true bugs

Acanthocerus is a genus of leaf-footed bugs in the family Coreidae. There are at least three described species in Acanthocerus.

== Species ==
These three species belong to the genus Acanthocerus:

- Acanthocerus crucifer Palisot de Beauvois, 1818
- Acanthocerus lobatus (Burmeister, 1835)
- Acanthocerus tuberculatus (Herrich-Schäffer, 1840)
