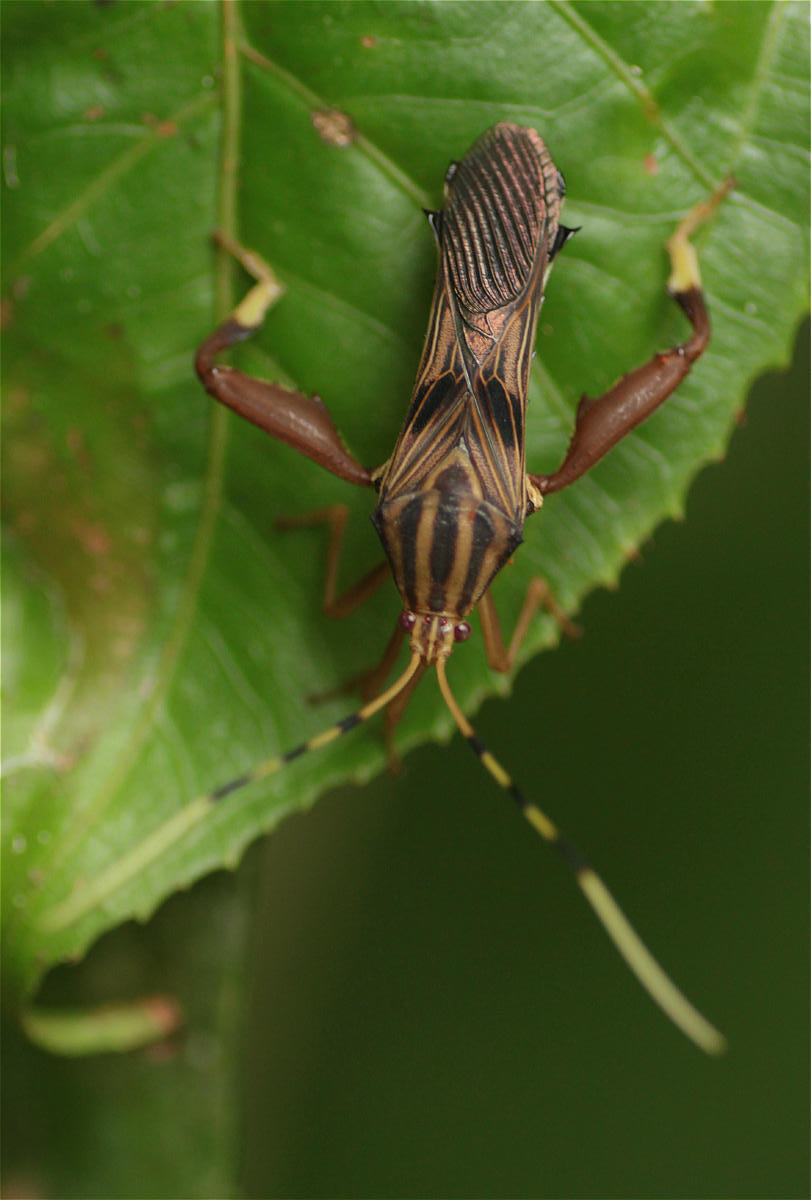
- Spathophora biclavata in Cuyabeno, Ecuador

Scientific classification
- Kingdom: Animalia
- Phylum: Arthropoda
- Clade: Pancrustacea
- Class: Insecta
- Order: Hemiptera
- Suborder: Heteroptera
- Family: Coreidae
- Subfamily: Meropachyinae; Stål, 1867

Tribes
- Merocorini Stål, 1870; Meropachyini Stål, 1868; Spathophorini Kormilev, 1954

= Meropachyinae =

Subfamily of true bugs

Meropachyinae is a subfamily of leaf-footed bugs in the family Coreidae. There are at least 50 described species in Meropachyinae, recorded from the Americas.

Meropachyinae has been commonly spelled "Meropachydinae" in the past, but "Meropachyinae" is now considered correct.

== Genera ==
These 27 genera belong to the subfamily Meropachyinae:

- Acocopus Stål, 1864
- Alcocerniella Brailovsky, 1999
- Allopeza Bergroth, 1912
- Badilloniella Brailovsky & Barrera, 2001
- Diariptus Stål, 1860
- Egerniella Brailovsky, 2000
- Esparzaniella Brailovsky & Barrera, 2001
- Flavius Stål, 1862
- Gracchus Stål, 1862
- Himellastella Brailovsky & Barrera, 1998
- Hirilcus Stål, 1862
- Juaristiella Brailovsky, 1999
- Larraldiella Brailovsky, 1999
- Lycambes Stål, 1862
- Marichisme Kirkaldy, 1904
- Merocoris Perty, 1833
- Meropachys Burmeister, 1835
- Meropalionellus Brailovsky, 2009
- Paralycambes Kormilev, 1954
- Peranthus Stål, 1868
- Possaniella Brailovsky, 1999
- Romoniella Brailovsky & Barrera, 2001
- Salamancaniella Brailovsky & Luna, 2000
- Serranoniella Brailovsky & Barrera, 2001
- Soteloniella Brailovsky, 1999
- Spathophora Amyot & Serville, 1843
- Zettelniella Brailovsky, 2009
