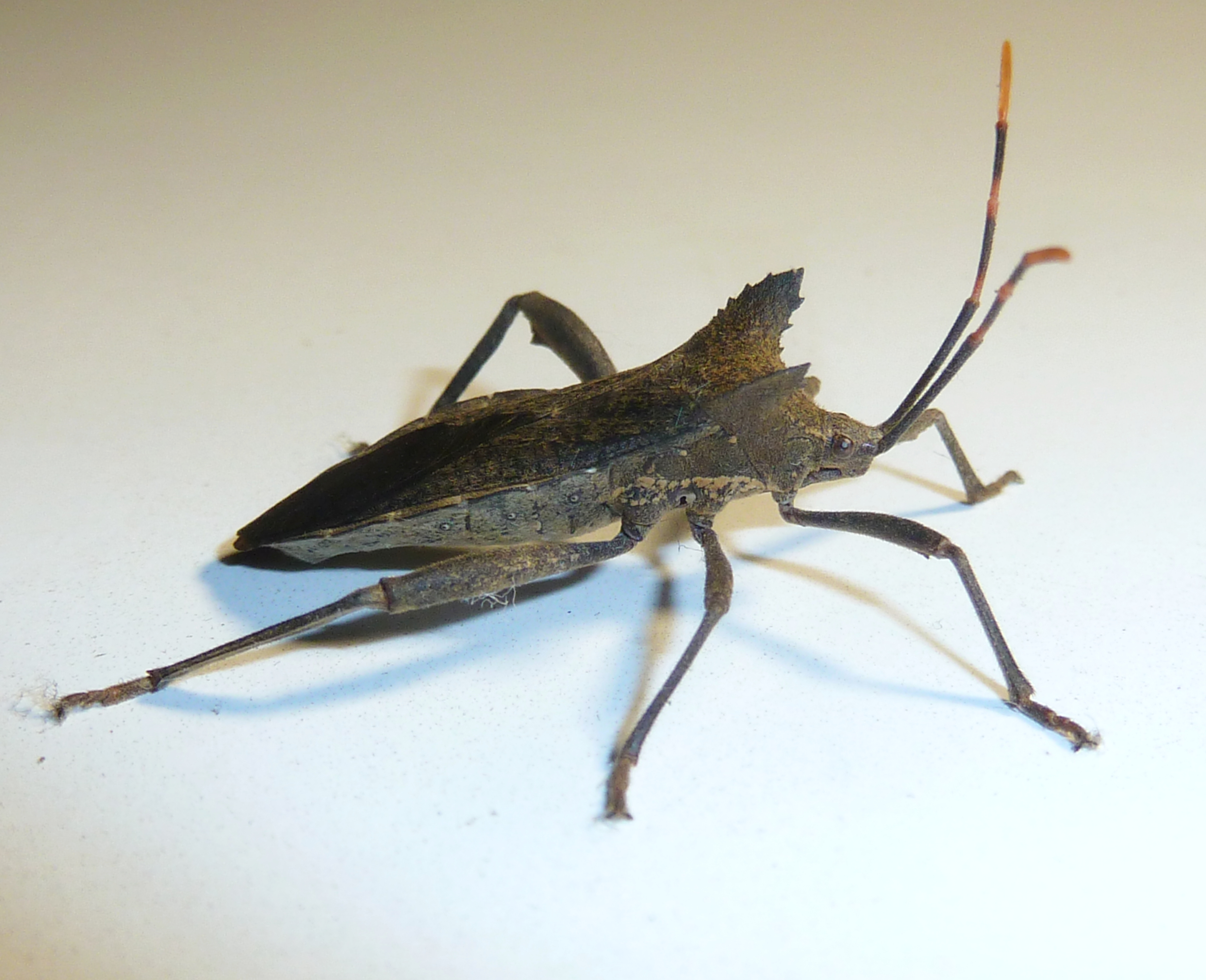
- Elasmopoda alata in South Africa

Scientific classification
- Kingdom: Animalia
- Phylum: Arthropoda
- Clade: Pancrustacea
- Class: Insecta
- Order: Hemiptera
- Suborder: Heteroptera
- Family: Coreidae
- Tribe: Mictini
- Genus: Elasmopoda; Stål, 1873

Synonyms
- Evagrius Distant, 1900; Holopterna Stål, 1873; Hoplopterna Stål, 1873; Hoploterna Distant, 1892

= Elasmopoda =

Genus of true bugs

Elasmopoda is a genus in the "true bug" family Coreidae, order Hemiptera. The genus is native to parts of eastern and southern Africa. The species are large "twig wilter" bugs, generally brown or greyish. The femora of the hind legs are somewhat enlarged and bent, but less than those of some related genera, and either unarmed, or less armed with spikes.

The genus Elasmopoda has junior synonyms, some of them apparently the products of clerical errors, in particular:

- synonym Evagrius Distant, 1900
- synonym Holopterna Stål, 1873
- synonym Hoplopterna Stål, 1873
- synonym Hoploterna Distant, 1892

Species include:

- Elasmopoda alata (Westwood, 1842)
- Elasmopoda antennata (Courteaux, 1907)
- Elasmopoda atramentaria (Germar, 1837)
- Elasmopoda dallasi (Stål, 1873)
- Elasmopoda elata Blöte, 1938
- Elasmopoda falx (Drury, 1782)
- Elasmopoda gladius (Distant, 1900)
- Elasmopoda lunata (Signoret, 1858)
- Elasmopoda parmenio Linnavuori, 1973
- Elasmopoda ugandica (Kirkaldy, 1909)
- Elasmopoda valga (Linnaeus, 1758)

== Gallery ==
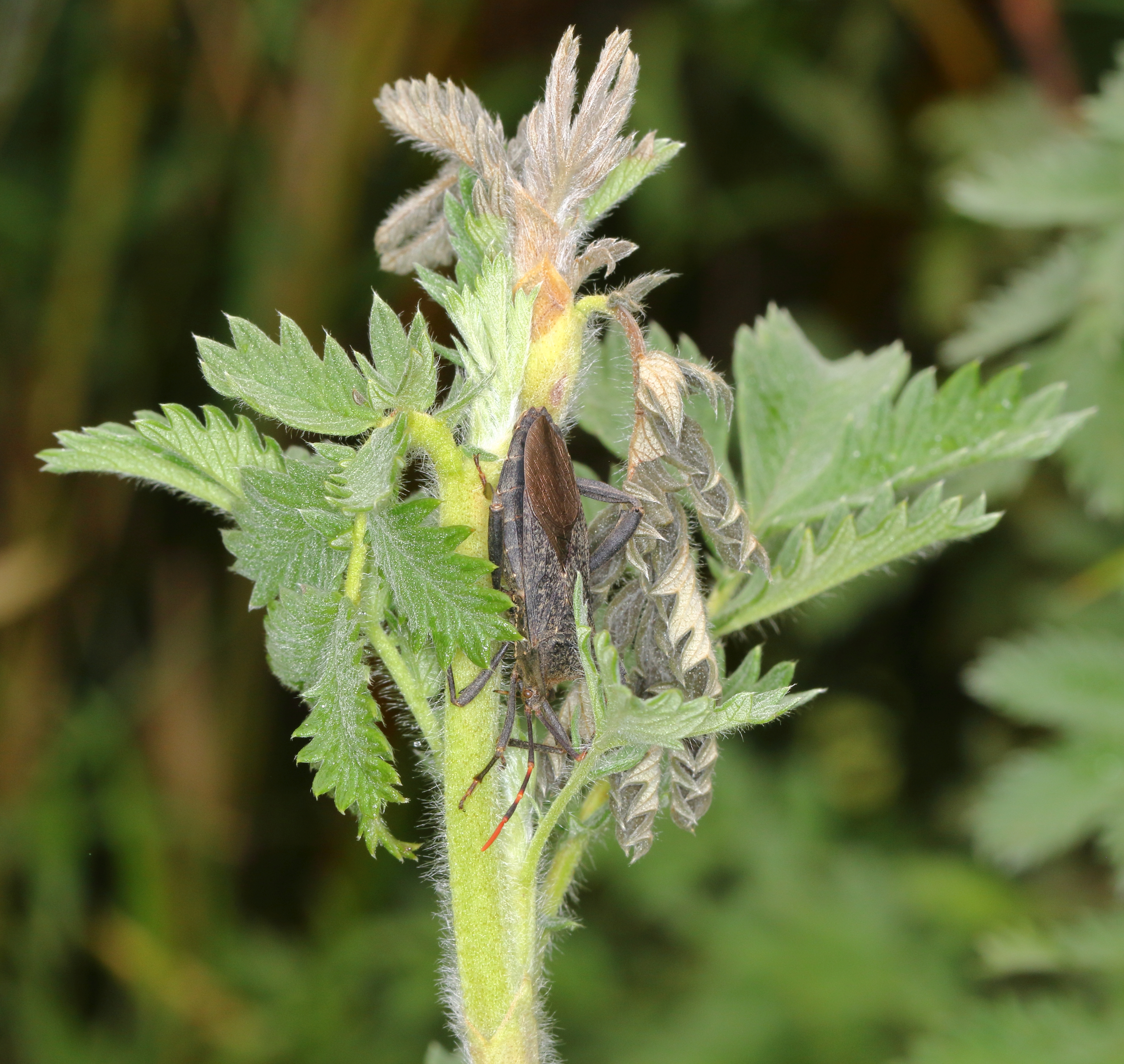

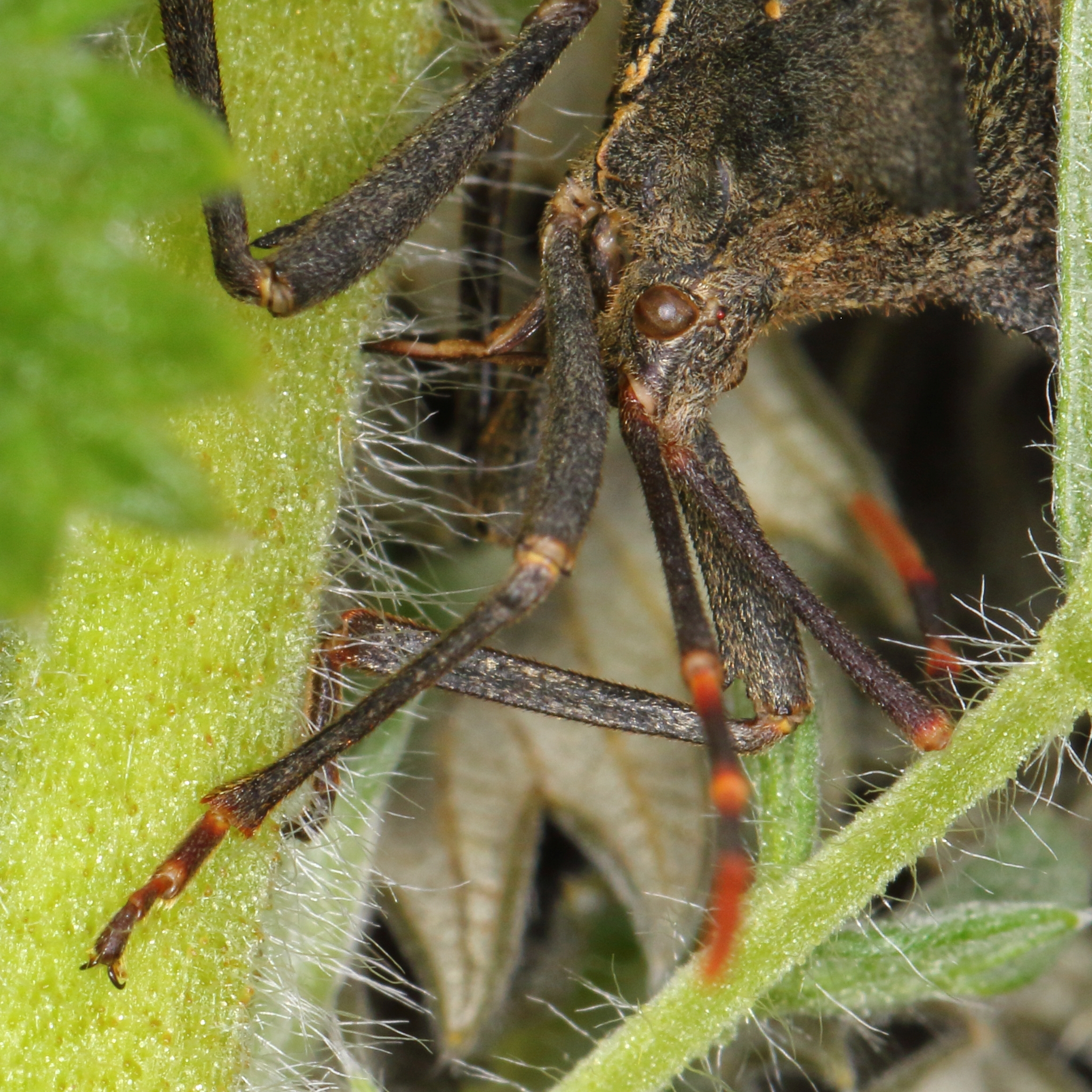
