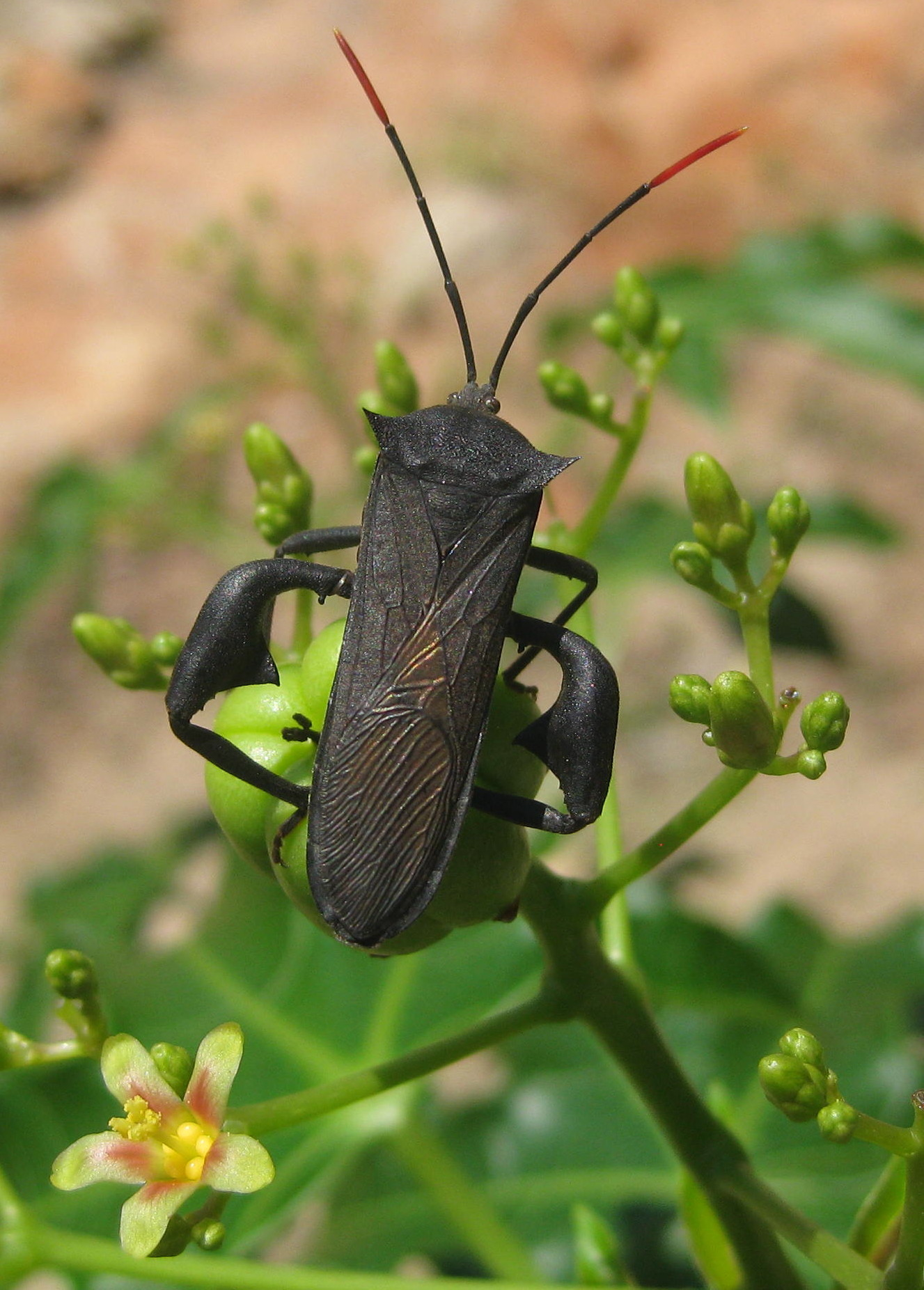
- Anoplocnemis curvipes

Scientific classification
- Kingdom: Animalia
- Phylum: Arthropoda
- Clade: Pancrustacea
- Class: Insecta
- Order: Hemiptera
- Suborder: Heteroptera
- Family: Coreidae
- Tribe: Mictini
- Genus: Anoplocnemis; Stål, 1873

= Anoplocnemis =

Genus of insects in the family Coreidae

Anoplocnemis is a genus of sap-sucking insects in the family Coreidae.
