= Neaira =

Scientific classification
- Domain: Eukaryota
- Kingdom: Animalia
- Phylum: Arthropoda
- Class: Insecta
- Order: Hemiptera
- Suborder: Heteroptera
- Family: Coreidae
- Subfamily: Coreinae
- Tribe: Mictini
- Genus: Neaira; Linnavuori, 1973

Genus of insects

Neaira is a monotypic genus of African bugs in the tribe Mictini, erected by Linnavuori in 1973. It contains the single species Neaira intermedia (García Varela, 1913 - originally described as Hoplopterna intermedia García Varela).
