= Villasitocoris =

Scientific classification
- Domain: Eukaryota
- Kingdom: Animalia
- Phylum: Arthropoda
- Class: Insecta
- Order: Hemiptera
- Suborder: Heteroptera
- Family: Coreidae
- Tribe: Coreini
- Genus: Villasitocoris; Brailovsky, 1990
- Species: V. inconspicuus

Binomial name
- Villasitocoris inconspicuus (Herrich-Schäffer, 1842)

Genus of true bugs

Villasitocoris is a genus of leaf-footed bugs in the family Coreidae. There is one described species in Villasitocoris, V. inconspicuus.
