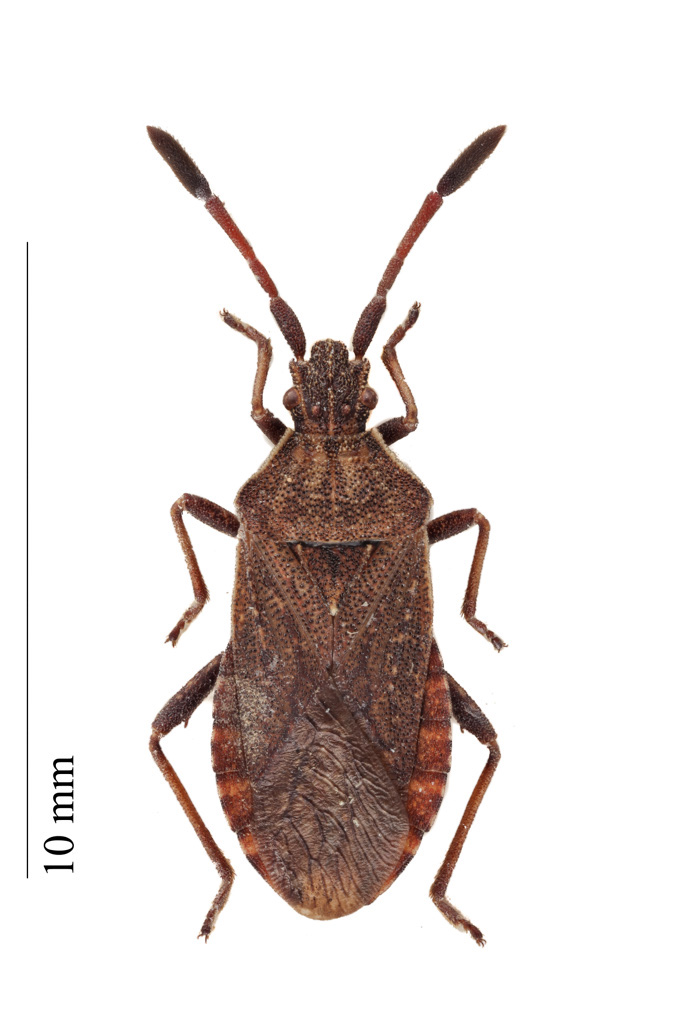
- U. spinipes

Scientific classification
- Domain: Eukaryota
- Kingdom: Animalia
- Phylum: Arthropoda
- Class: Insecta
- Order: Hemiptera
- Suborder: Heteroptera
- Family: Coreidae
- Tribe: Pseudophloeini
- Genus: Ulmicola; Kirkaldy, 1909

= Ulmicola =

Genus of true bugs

Ulmicola is a genus of true bugs belonging to the family Coreidae.

The species of this genus are found in Europe.

Species:

- Ulmicola spinipes (Fallén, 1807)
