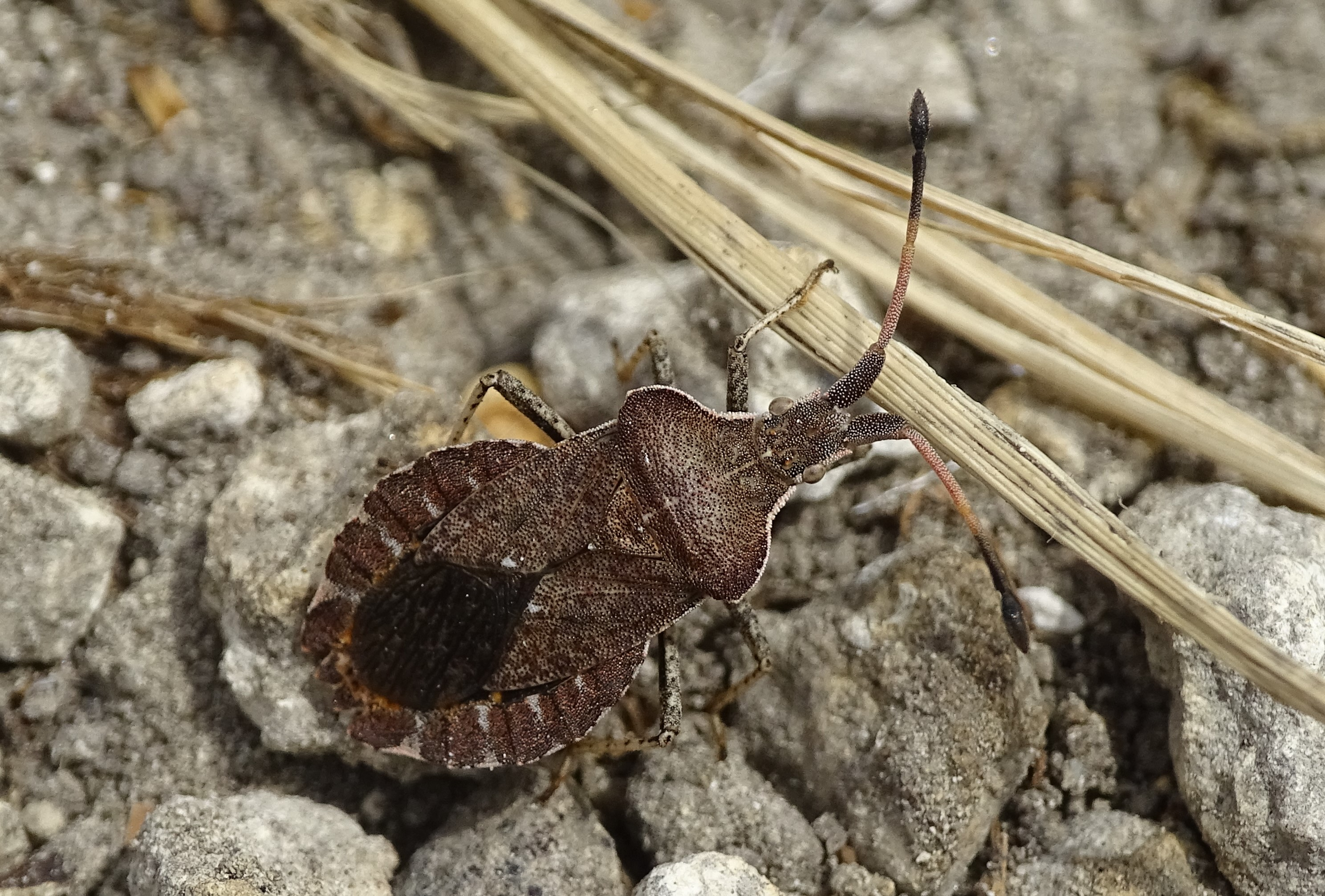
- Enoplops scapha

Scientific classification
- Domain: Eukaryota
- Kingdom: Animalia
- Phylum: Arthropoda
- Class: Insecta
- Order: Hemiptera
- Suborder: Heteroptera
- Family: Coreidae
- Subfamily: Coreinae
- Tribe: Coreini
- Genus: Enoplops; Amyot & Audinet-Serville, 1843

Synonyms
- Palethrocoris Kolenati, 1845

= Enoplops =

Genus of true bugs

Enoplops is a genus of Palaearctic bugs, in the family Coreidae and tribe Coreini. Species are recorded from Europe and includes E. scapha found in the British Isles; there are also records from North Africa and China.

== Species ==
The Coreoidea Species File lists the following:

1. Enoplops bos Dohrn, 1860
2. Enoplops disciger (Kolenati, 1845)
3. Enoplops eversmanni Jakovlev, 1881
4. Enoplops hashemii Hoberlandt, 1989
5. Enoplops heintzii (Oshanin, 1871)
6. Enoplops potanini (Jakovlev, 1890)
7. Enoplops scapha (Fabricius, 1794) - type species
8. Enoplops sibiricus Jakovlev, 1889
