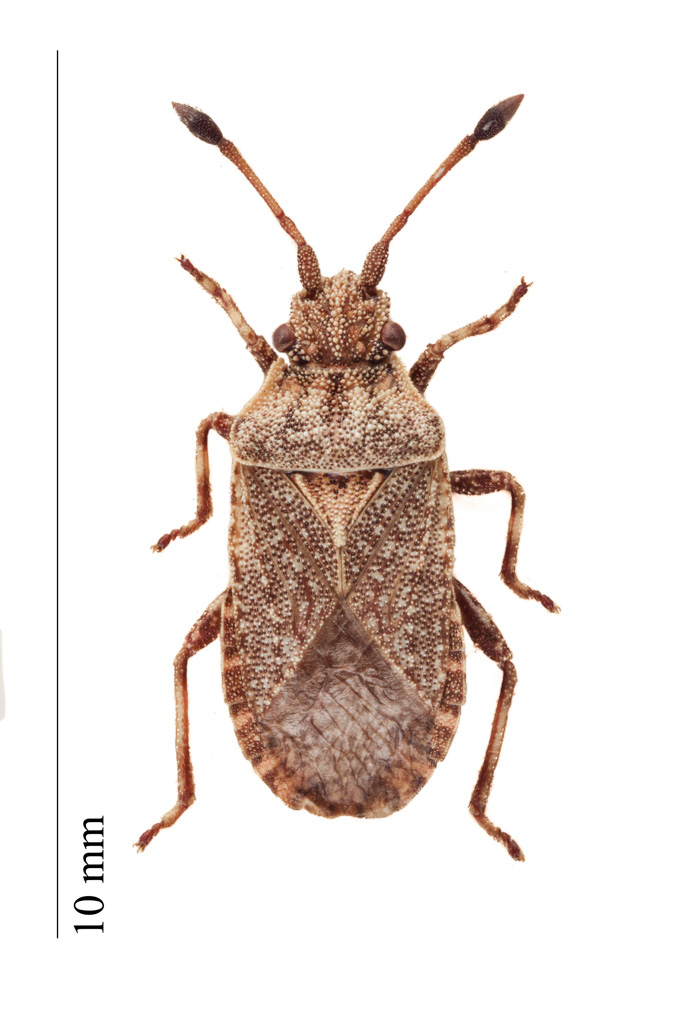
- Bathysolen nubilus

Scientific classification
- Kingdom: Animalia
- Phylum: Arthropoda
- Class: Insecta
- Order: Hemiptera
- Suborder: Heteroptera
- Family: Coreidae
- Tribe: Pseudophloeini
- Genus: Bathysolen; Fieber, 1860

= Bathysolen =

Genus of true bugs

Bathysolen is a genus of true bugs belonging to the family Coreidae. The species of this genus are found in Europe

== Species ==
The following species are recognised in the genus Bathysolen:

- Bathysolen poppii Bergevin, 1913
- Bathysolen nubilus (Fallén, 1807)
