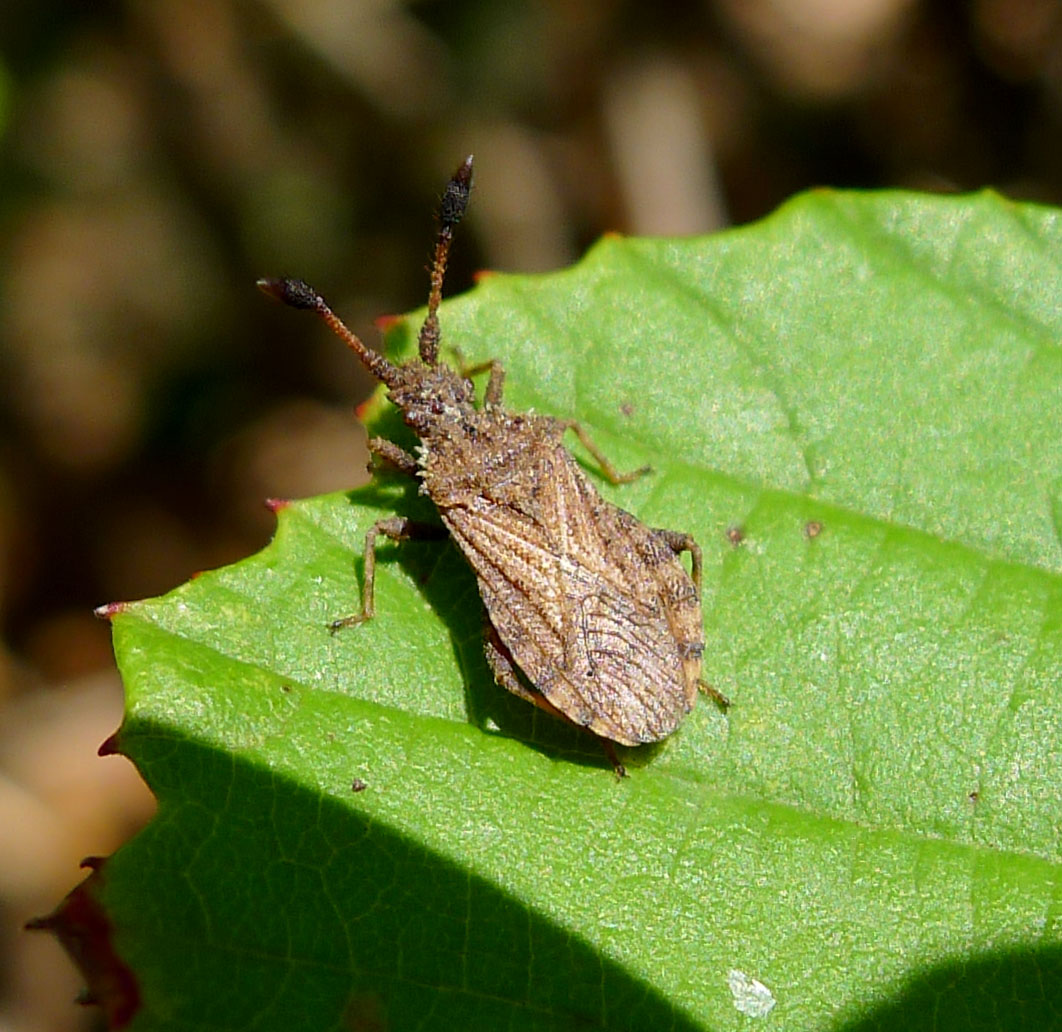
- Arenocoris waltlii

Scientific classification
- Kingdom: Animalia
- Phylum: Arthropoda
- Clade: Pancrustacea
- Class: Insecta
- Order: Hemiptera
- Suborder: Heteroptera
- Family: Coreidae
- Subfamily: Pseudophloeinae; Stål, 1868

= Pseudophloeinae =

Subfamily of true bugs

Pseudophloeinae is a subfamily of leaf-footed bugs in the family Coreidae. There are at least 100 described species in Pseudophloeinae, distributed worldwide.

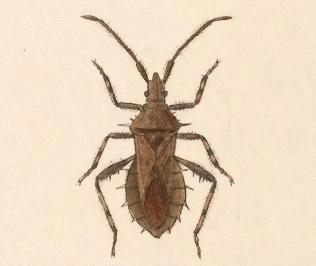
Vilga mexicana

== Genera ==
The subfamily Pseudophloeinae contains two tribes:

=== Clavigrallini ===
Auth. Stål, 1873; distribution Africa, Middle East, Asia, Australia

1. Clavigralla Spinola, 1837
2. Clavigralloides Dolling, 1978
3. Gralliclava Dolling, 1978
4. Oncaspidia Stål, 1873

=== Pseudophloeini ===
Auth. Stål, 1868; distribution worldwide

- Anoplocerus Kiritshenko, 1926^{i c g}
- Arenocoris Hahn, 1834^{i c g}
- Bathysolen Fieber, 1860^{i c g}
- Bothrostethus Fieber, 1860^{i c g}
- Ceraleptus Costa, 1847^{i c g b}
- Coriomeris Westwood, 1842^{i c g b}
- Hoplolomia Stål, 1873^{i c g}
- Indolomia Dolling, 1986^{i c g}
- Loxocnemis Fieber, 1860^{i c g}
- Mevanidea Reuter, 1883^{i c g}
- Mevaniomorpha Reuter, 1883^{i c g}
- Microtelocerus Reuter, 1900^{i c g}
- Myla Stål, 1866^{i c g}
- Nemocoris Sahlberg, 1848^{i c g}
- Neomevaniomorpha Dolling, 1986^{i c g}
- Paramyla Linnavuori, 1971^{i c g}
- Pseudomyla Dolling, 1986^{i c g}
- Psilolomia Breddin, 1909^{i c g}
- Pungra Dolling, 1986^{i c g}
- Risbecocoris Izzard, 1949^{i c g}
- Strobilotoma Fieber, 1860^{i c g}
- Ulmicola Kirkaldy, 1909^{i c g}
- Urartucoris Putshkov, 1979^{i c g}
- Vilga Stål, 1860^{i c g}

Data sources: i = ITIS, c = Catalogue of Life, g = GBIF, b = Bugguide.net
