= Sagotylus =

Scientific classification
- Domain: Eukaryota
- Kingdom: Animalia
- Phylum: Arthropoda
- Class: Insecta
- Order: Hemiptera
- Suborder: Heteroptera
- Family: Coreidae
- Tribe: Acanthocerini
- Genus: Sagotylus; Mayr, 1865
- Species: S. confluens

Binomial name
- Sagotylus confluens (Say, 1832)

Genus of true bugs

Sagotylus is a genus of leaf-footed bugs in the family Coreidae, containing one described species, S. confluens.
