= Himella =

Scientific classification
- Domain: Eukaryota
- Kingdom: Animalia
- Phylum: Arthropoda
- Class: Insecta
- Order: Hemiptera
- Suborder: Heteroptera
- Family: Coreidae
- Subfamily: Coreinae
- Tribe: Nematopodini
- Genus: Himella; Dallas, 1852

Genus of true bugs

Himella is an insect genus of the family Coreidae, or leaf-footed bugs, from South America.

== Species ==
- Himella incaica Brailovsky & Barrera, 1986
- Himella paramerana Brailovsky & Barrera, 1986
- Himella venosa Dallas, 1852
