= Holhymenia =

Scientific classification
- Kingdom: Animalia
- Phylum: Arthropoda
- Class: Insecta
- Order: Hemiptera
- Suborder: Heteroptera
- Family: Coreidae
- Subfamily: Coreinae
- Tribe: Anisoscelini
- Genus: Holhymenia; Lepeletier & Serville, 1825

Synonyms
- Holligmenia Thon, 1829; Holymenia Burmeister, 1835

Genus of true bugs

Holhymenia is a genus in the "true bug" family Coreidae, order Hemiptera. The genus was erected by Amédée Louis Michel Lepeletier and Jean Guillaume Audinet-Serville in 1825. The name is frequently misspelled as "Holymenia", due to an unjustified emendation by Hermann Burmeister ten years after the name was originally published.

Many species of Holhymenia feed on the fruits of Passiflora spp, and several are considered pests of commercial passion fruit production.
