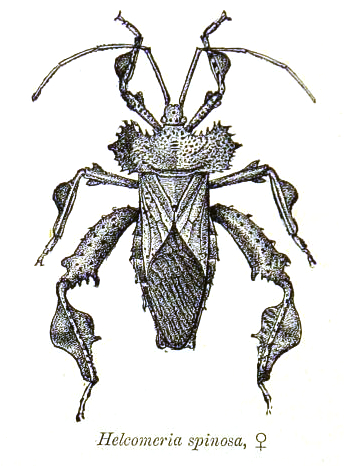
- Helcomeria spinosa (Signoret, 1851)

Scientific classification
- Kingdom: Animalia
- Phylum: Arthropoda
- Clade: Pancrustacea
- Class: Insecta
- Order: Hemiptera
- Suborder: Heteroptera
- Family: Coreidae
- Subfamily: Coreinae
- Tribe: Mictini
- Genus: Helcomeria; Stål, 1873

Type species
- Helcomeria spinosa (Signoret, 1851)

= Helcomeria =

Genus of true bugs

Helcomeria is a genus of coreid bug found in Asia. The genus was established on the basis of the species described as Petascelis spinosus by Signoret in 1851. Helcomeria spinosa is found in China in Yunnan, in Tibet, in India (Sikkim, Nagaland), Bhutan, Myanmar and Laos. The second species in the genus H. osheai is found south of Laos.
