= Nemocoris =

Scientific classification
- Domain: Eukaryota
- Kingdom: Animalia
- Phylum: Arthropoda
- Class: Insecta
- Order: Hemiptera
- Suborder: Heteroptera
- Family: Coreidae
- Tribe: Pseudophloeini
- Genus: Nemocoris; Sahlberg, 1848

Genus of true bugs

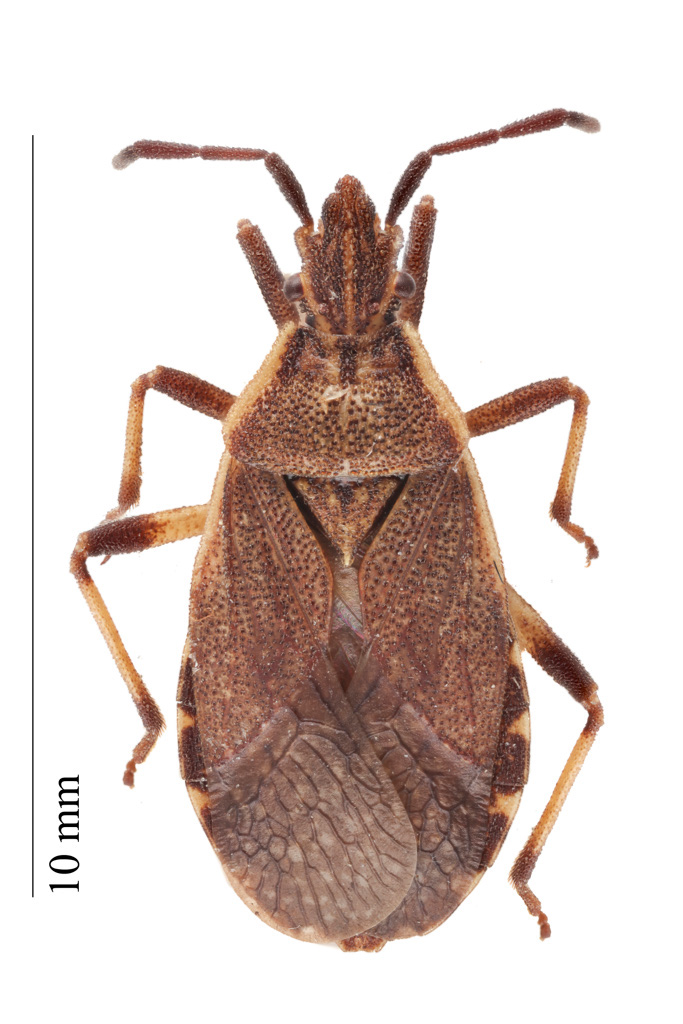

Nemocoris is a genus of true bugs belonging to the family Coreidae.

The species of this genus are found in Europe.

Species:

- Nemocoris fallenii Sahlberg, 1848
