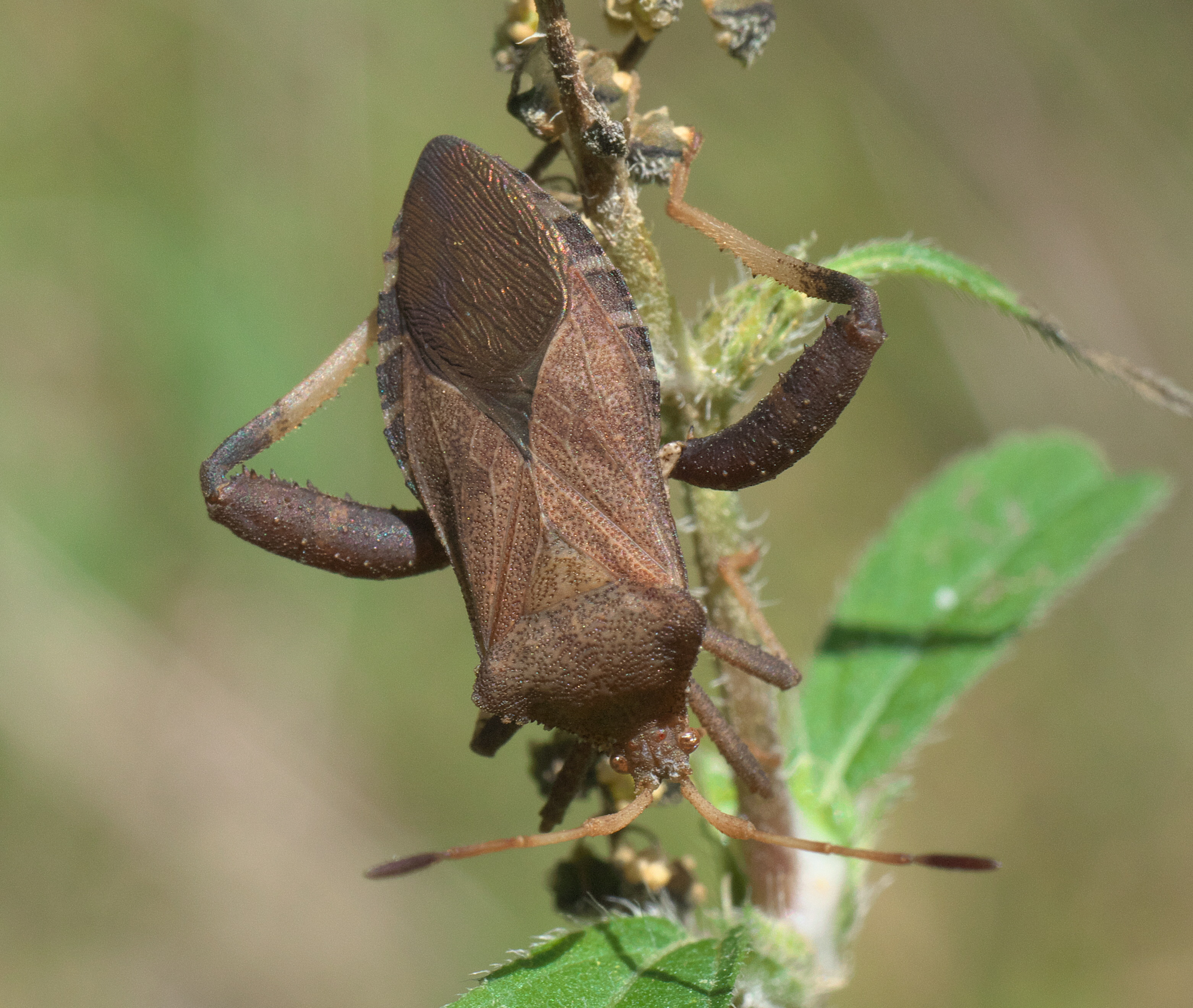

Scientific classification
- Domain: Eukaryota
- Kingdom: Animalia
- Phylum: Arthropoda
- Class: Insecta
- Order: Hemiptera
- Suborder: Heteroptera
- Family: Coreidae
- Tribe: Acanthocerini
- Genus: Euthochtha; Mayr, 1865
- Species: E. galeator

Binomial name
- Euthochtha galeator (Fabricius, 1803)

= Euthochtha =

Genus of true bugs

Euthochtha is a genus of leaf-footed bugs in the family Coreidae (Coreid bugs), containing only one described species, E. galeator. It is sometimes referred to by the common name "helmeted squash bug".

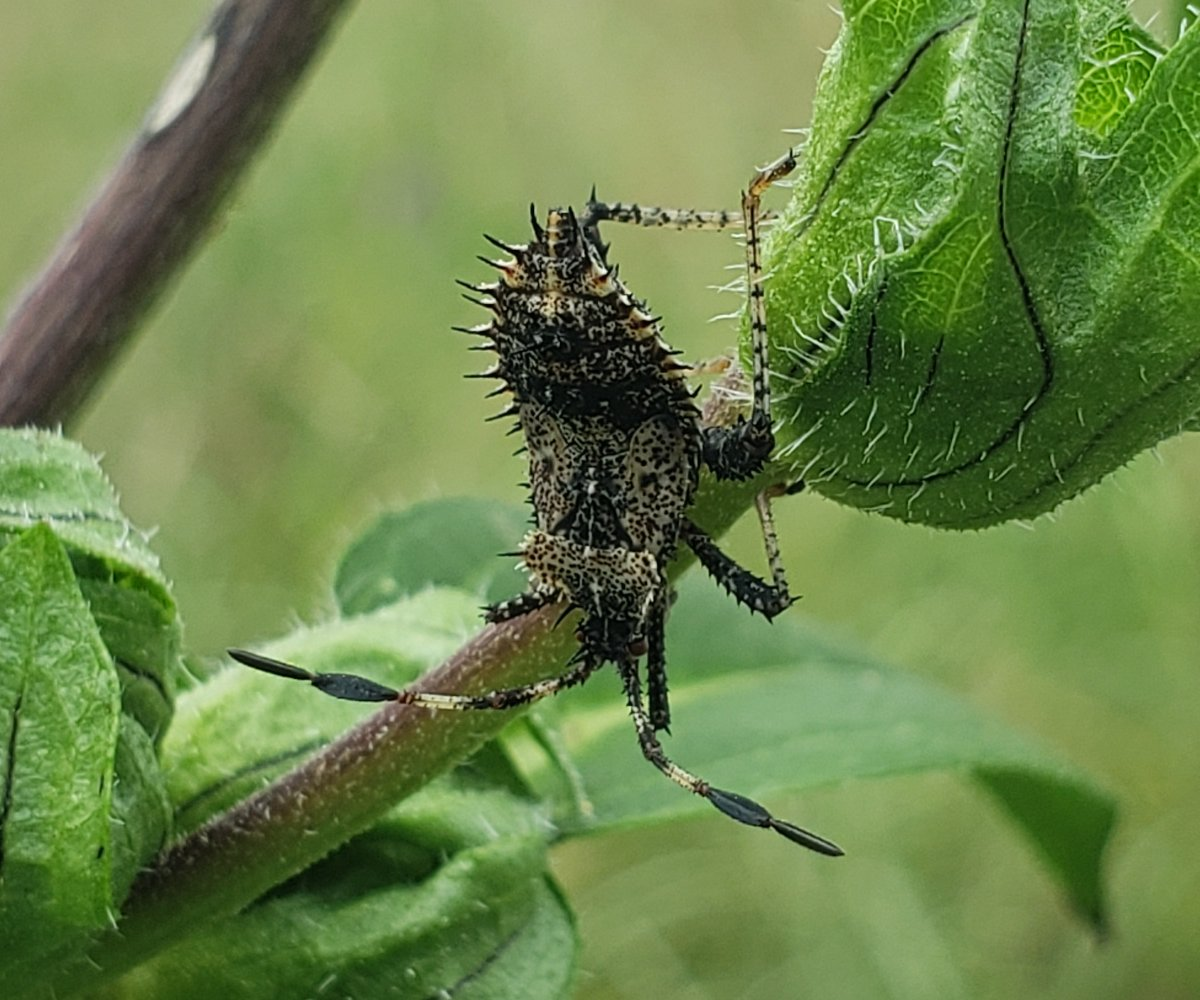
E. galeator late instar nymph

E. galeator late instar nymph
