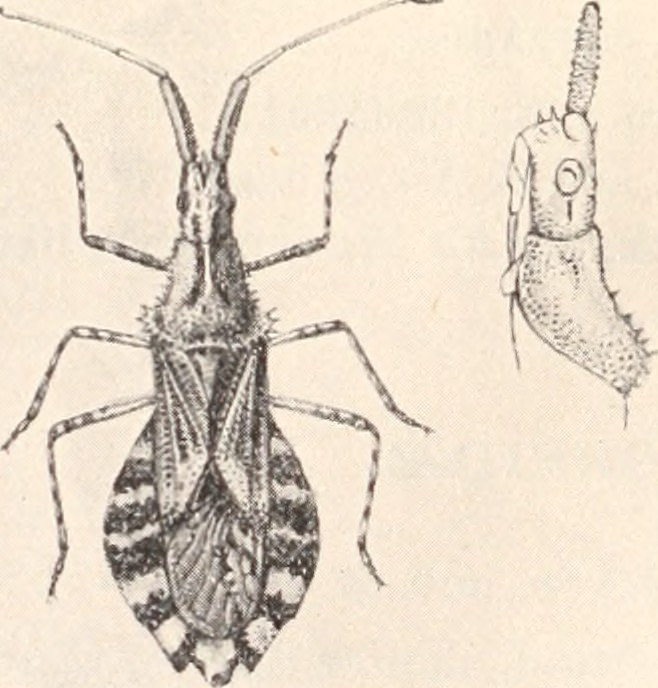

Scientific classification
- Kingdom: Animalia
- Phylum: Arthropoda
- Class: Insecta
- Order: Hemiptera
- Suborder: Heteroptera
- Family: Coreidae
- Subfamily: Coreinae
- Tribe: Coreini
- Genus: Oannes; Distant, 1911
- Species: O. spinosus

Binomial name
- Oannes spinosus Distant, 1911

= Oannes spinosus =

Species of true bug

Oannes spinosus is a species of leaf-footed bug known from South Africa. It is the only species in the genus Oannes.
