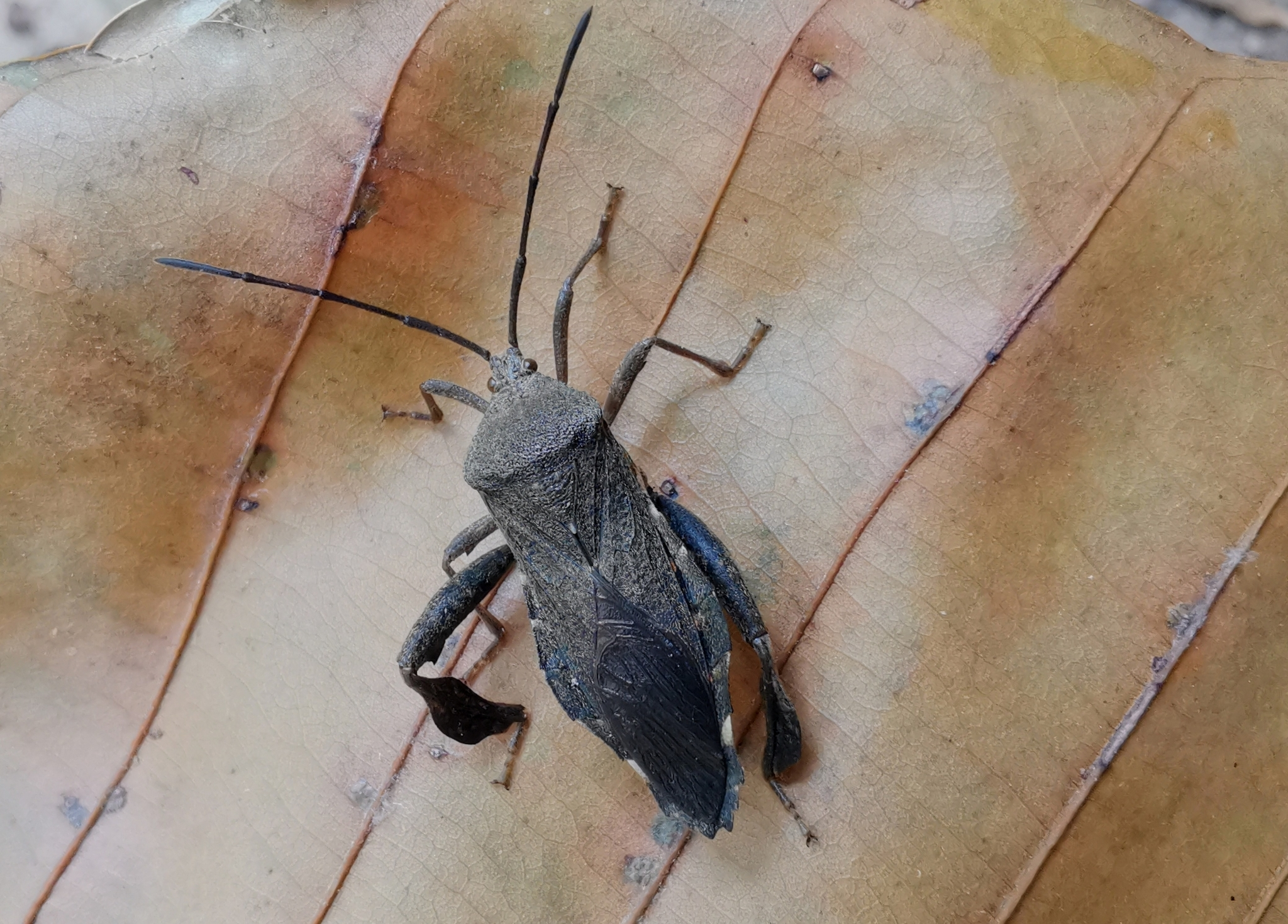
- Aurelianus yunnananus

Scientific classification
- Kingdom: Animalia
- Phylum: Arthropoda
- Clade: Pancrustacea
- Class: Insecta
- Order: Hemiptera
- Suborder: Heteroptera
- Family: Coreidae
- Subfamily: Coreinae
- Tribe: Mictini
- Genus: Aurelianus; Distant, 1902

= Aurelianus (bug) =

Genus of Hemiptera

Aurelianus is a genus of seed bugs in the tribe Mictini, erected by William Lucas Distant in 1902. It includes the species Aurelianus elongatus.
