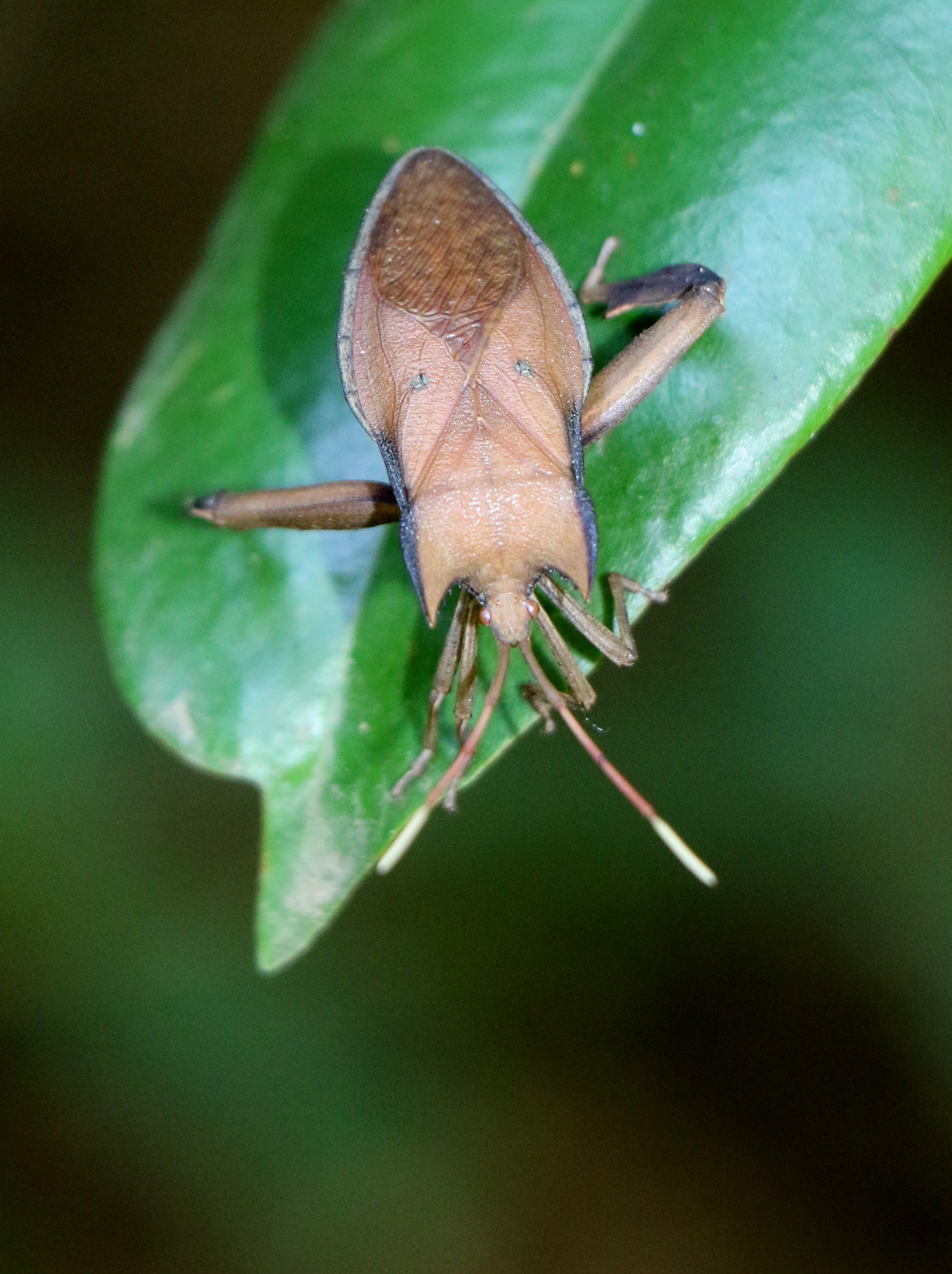
- Tip-wilter at Browns Field (New South Wales), Australia

Scientific classification
- Domain: Eukaryota
- Kingdom: Animalia
- Phylum: Arthropoda
- Class: Insecta
- Order: Hemiptera
- Suborder: Heteroptera
- Family: Coreidae
- Genus: Canungrantmictis; Harry Brailovsky Alperowits. 2002
- Species: C. morindana

Binomial name
- Canungrantmictis morindana Harry Brailovsky Alperowits. 2002

= Canungrantmictis =

Genus of true bugs

Canungrantmictis is a genus of Australian true bugs containing a single species, C. morindana. It was described in 2002 by Harry Brailovsky.
