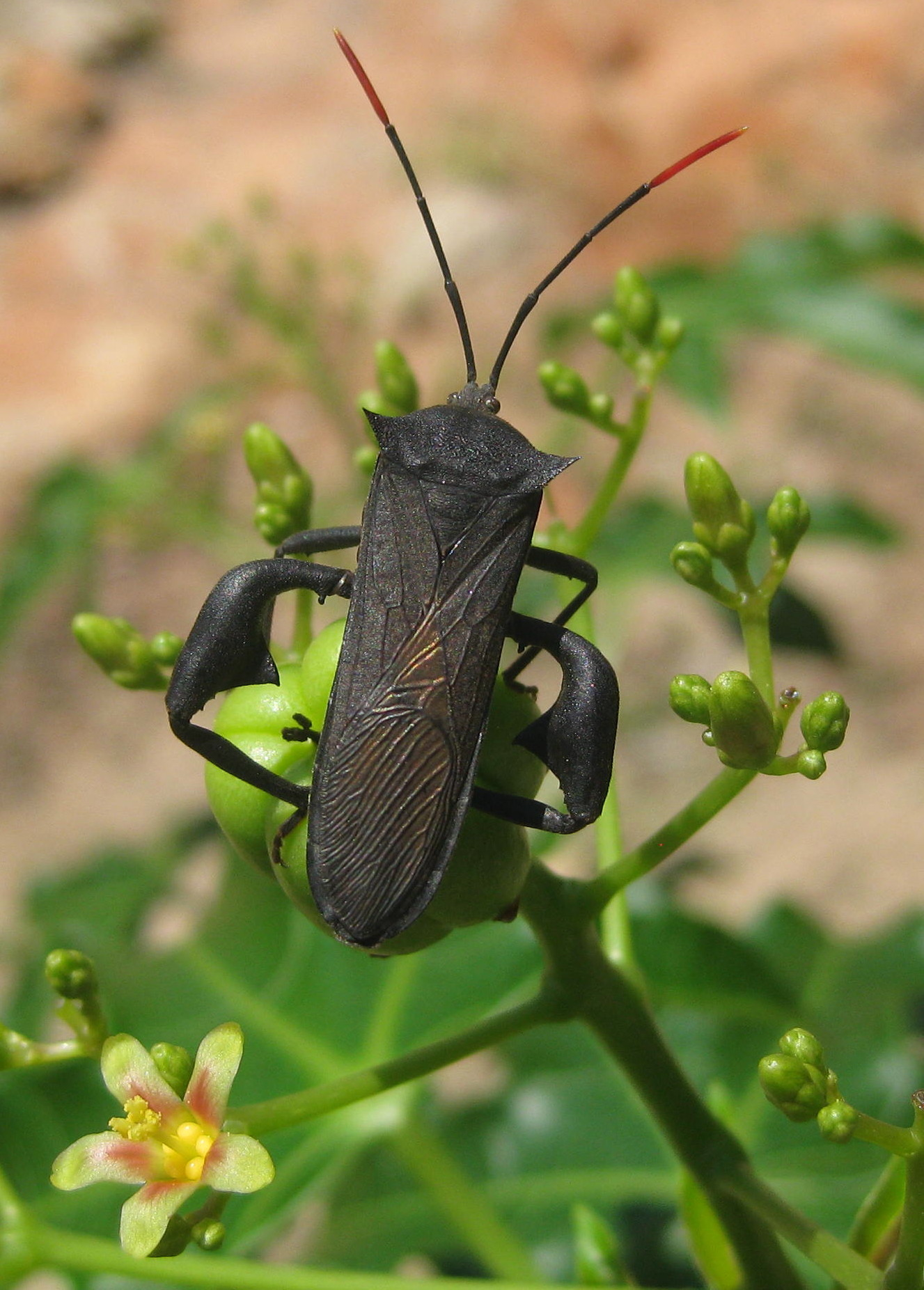
- Anoplocnemis curvipes with typical enlarged hind femora

Scientific classification
- Kingdom: Animalia
- Phylum: Arthropoda
- Clade: Pancrustacea
- Class: Insecta
- Order: Hemiptera
- Suborder: Heteroptera
- Superfamily: Coreoidea
- Family: Coreidae; Leach, 1815

Subfamilies
- Coreinae; Meropachyinae; Pseudophloeinae; and see text

= Coreidae =

Coreidae Temporal range: Cretaceous–Recent

Family of insects

A female leaf-footed bug, family Coreidae and tribe Acanthocephalini, deposits an egg before flying off.

Coreidae is a large family of predominantly sap-sucking insects in the Hemipteran suborder Heteroptera. The name "Coreidae" derives from the genus Coreus, which derives from the Ancient Greek κόρις (kóris) meaning bug.

As a family, the Coreidae are cosmopolitan, but most of the species are tropical or subtropical.

== Common names and significance ==
The common names of the Coreidae vary regionally. Leaf-footed bug refers to leaf-like expansions on the legs of some species, generally on the hind tibiae. In North America, the pest status of species such as Anasa tristis on squash plants and other cucurbits gave rise to the name squash bugs. The Coreidae are called twig-wilters or tip-wilters in parts of Africa and Australia because many species feed on young twigs, injecting enzymes that macerate the tissues of the growing tips and cause them to wilt abruptly.

== Morphology and appearance ==
The Coreidae commonly are oval-shaped, with antennae composed of four segments, numerous veins in the membrane of the fore wings, and externally visible repugnatorial stink glands. They vary in size from 7 to 45 mm long, which implies that the family includes some of the biggest species of Heteroptera. The body shape is quite variable; some species are broadly oval, others are elongated with parallel sides, and a few are slender. Many species with the "leaf-footed" tibiae are very slender with conspicuous expansions of the hind tibiae, but some robust species also have decided expansions. Some species are covered with spines and tubercles. As an example of these, the tribe Phyllomorphini Mulsant & Rey, 1870, are strikingly aberrant, with thin legs, spiny bristles, and laciniate outlines and adornments.

Many of the more robust species have grossly enlarged, thickened, and bowed hind femora armed with spikes on the inner edge, and with hind tibiae to match, though the enlargement of the tibiae is less exaggerated.

In the nymphs, the openings of the two repugnatorial stink glands of the Coreidae are visible as two projections or spots on the medial line of the dorsal surface of the abdomen, one at the anterior and one at the posterior edge of the fifth abdominal tergite above the glands inside. During the final ecdysis, the anatomy is rearranged and the glands end up in the metathorax, opening laterally through ostioles between the mesothoracic and metathoracic pleura.

== Biology and habits ==
The Coreidae generally feed on the sap of plants. Some species reportedly are actively carnivorous, but material evidence is lacking, and in the field, some are easy to confuse with some species of the Reduviidae, so doubt has been cast on the veracity of the claims.

Some Coreidae, such as Phyllomorpha laciniata, exhibit parental care by carrying their eggs. This behaviour significantly improves the eggs' chances of avoiding the attacks of parasitoids.

== Taxonomy and systematics ==
The Coreidae are placed in the order Hemiptera and closely related to the families Alydidae, Hyocephalidae, Rhopalidae, and Stenocephalidae. Together, these five families form the superfamily Coreoidea. The family is large, with more than 1,900 species in over 270 genera.

Most taxonomists dealing with the Coreidae divide the family into three or four subfamilies. Numerous tribes of the Coreinae have previously been proposed for elevation to subfamily rank, for example, the Agriopocorini, Colpurini, Phyllomorphini, and Procamptini, but the only one of these changes that at least a significant minority of researchers accepted is the elevation of the Agriopocorinae, and more recent reviews tend to treat them as a tribe again, recognizing only the three subfamilies known by 1867 plus Hydarinae.

The family has been demonstrated to be non-monophyletic, as Hydarinae and Pseudophloeinae are more closely related to Alydidae than to other coreids.

=== Selected genera ===
The following genera are included in the family Coreidae:

Coreinae Leach, 1815

- Acanthocephala Laporte, 1833
- Acanthocerus Palisot, 1818
- Acanthocoris Amyot & Serville, 1843
- Agathyrna Stål, 1861
- Althos Kirkaldy, 1904
- Anasa Amyot & Serville, 1843
- Anisoscelis Latreille, 1829
- Anoplocnemis Stål, 1873
- Aurelianus Distant, 1902
- Brachytes Westwood, 1842
- Canungrantmictis Brailovsky, 2002
- Carlisis Stål, 1858
- Catorhintha Stål, 1859
- Centrocoris Kolenati, 1845
- Ceratopachys Westwood, 1842
- Cercinthus Stål, 1860
- Chariesterus Laporte, 1833
- Chelinidea Uhler, 1863
- Cimolus Stål, 1862
- Coreus Leach, 1815
- Dalader Amyot & Serville, 1843
- Elasmopoda Stål, 1873
- Enoplops Amyot & Serville, 1843
- Eubule Stål, 1868
- Euthochtha Mayr, 1865
- Fracastorius Distant, 1902
- Gelonus Stål, 1866
- Gonocerus Berthold, 1827
- Helcomeria Stål, 1873
- Himella Dallas, 1852
- Holhymenia Lepeletier & Serville, 1825
- Homoeocerus Burmeister, 1835
- Hygia Uhler, 1861
- Hypselonotus Hahn, 1833
- Leptoglossus Guérin-Méneville, 1831 – conifer seed bugs
- Mamurius Stål, 1862
- Menenotus Laporte, 1832
- Mictis Leach, 1814
- Molipteryx Kiritshenko, 1916
- Mozena Amyot & Serville, 1843
- Namacus Amyot & Serville, 1843
- Narnia Stål, 1862
- Neaira Linnavuori, 1973
- Nematopus Berthold, 1827
- Nisoscolopocerus Barber, 1928
- Oannes Distant, 1911
- Pachylis Le Peletier & Serville, 1825
- Phyllomorpha Laporte 1833
- Physomerus Burmeister, 1835
- Piezogaster Amyot & Serville, 1843
- Plectropoda Bergroth, 1894
- Pomponatius Distant, 1904
- Prionolomia Stål, 1873
- Pseudotheraptus Brown, 1955
- Sagotylus Mayr, 1865
- Savius Stål, 1862
- Scolopocerus Uhler, 1875
- Sephina Amyot & Serville, 1843
- Sethenira Spinola, 1837
- Spartocera Laporte, 1833
- Spathocera Stein, 1860
- Syromastus Berthold, 1827
- Thasus Stål, 1865
- Vazquezitocoris Brailovsky, 1990
- Villasitocoris Brailovsky, 1990
- Wolfius Distant, 1902
- Zicca Amyot & Serville, 1843

Hydarinae Stål, 1873

- Madura Stål, 1860

Meropachyinae Stål, 1867

- Merocoris Perty, 1833

Pseudophloeinae Stål, 1867

- Arenocoris Hahn, 1834
- Bathysolen Fieber, 1860
- Bothrostethus Fieber 1860
- Ceraleptus Costa, 1847
- Clavigralla Spinola, 1837
- Coriomeris Westwood, 1842
- Nemocoris Sahlberg, 1848
- Ulmicola Kirkaldy, 1909

== Gallery ==
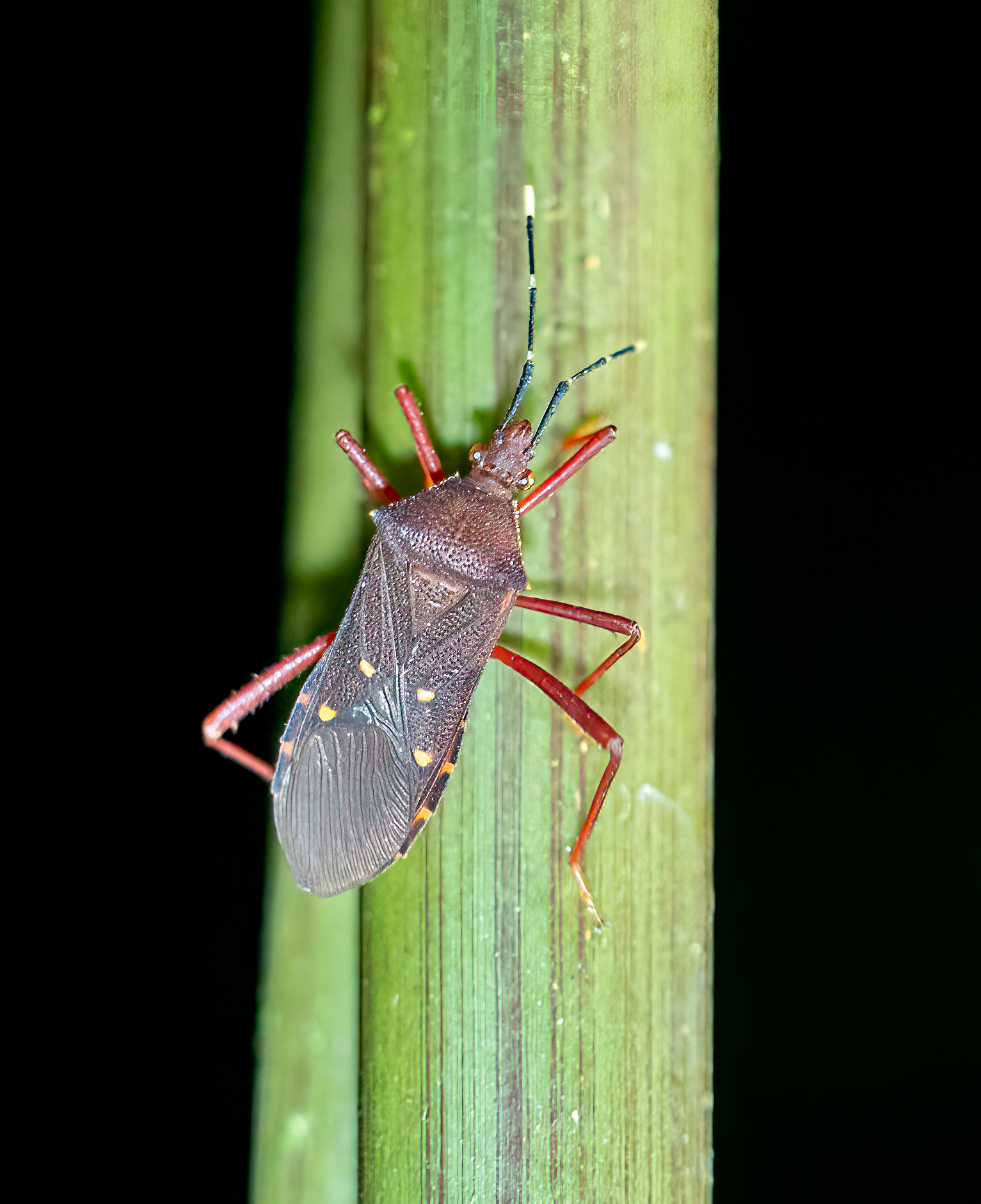
Leptoscelis quadrisignatus

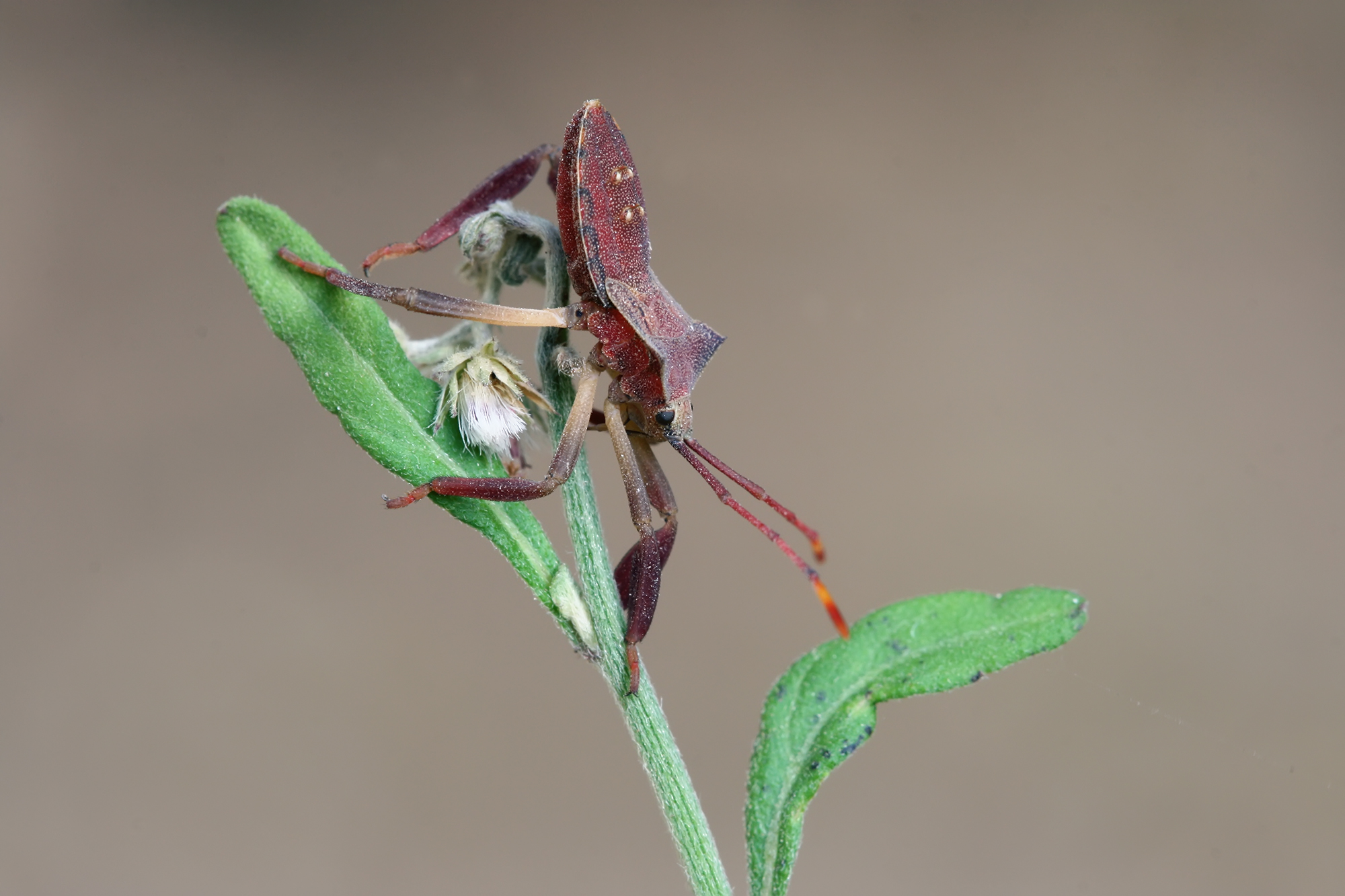
Feeding "twig-wilter" nymph

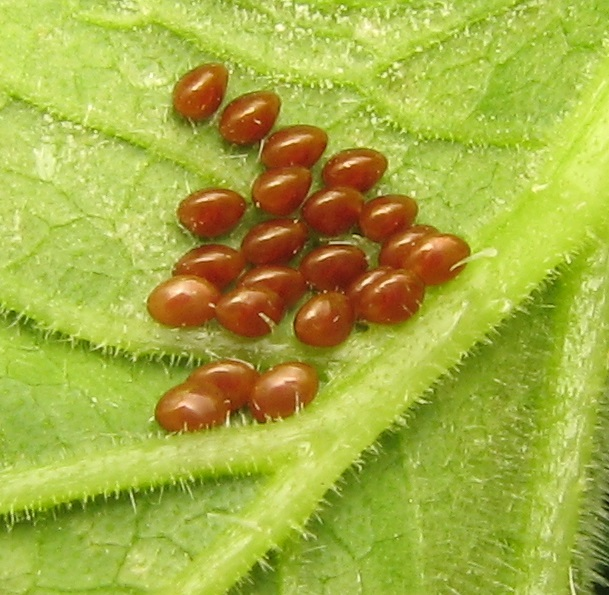
Anasa tristis (squash bug) eggs

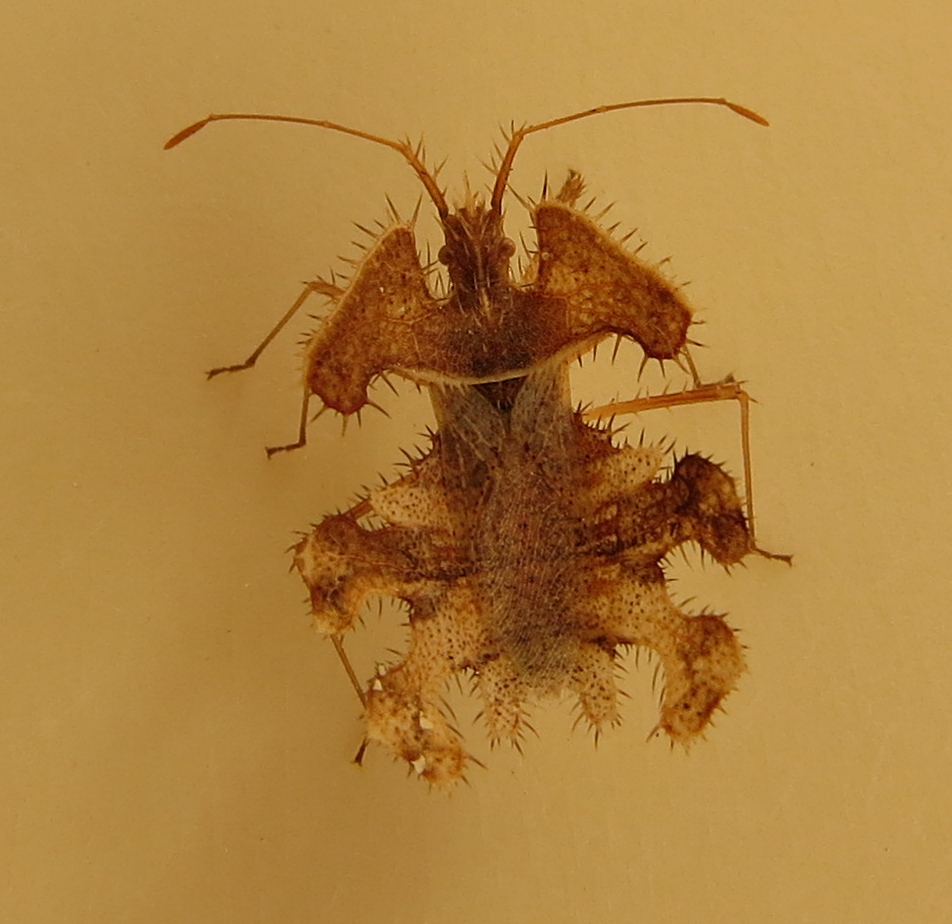
Pephricus sp., of the tribe Phyllomorphini

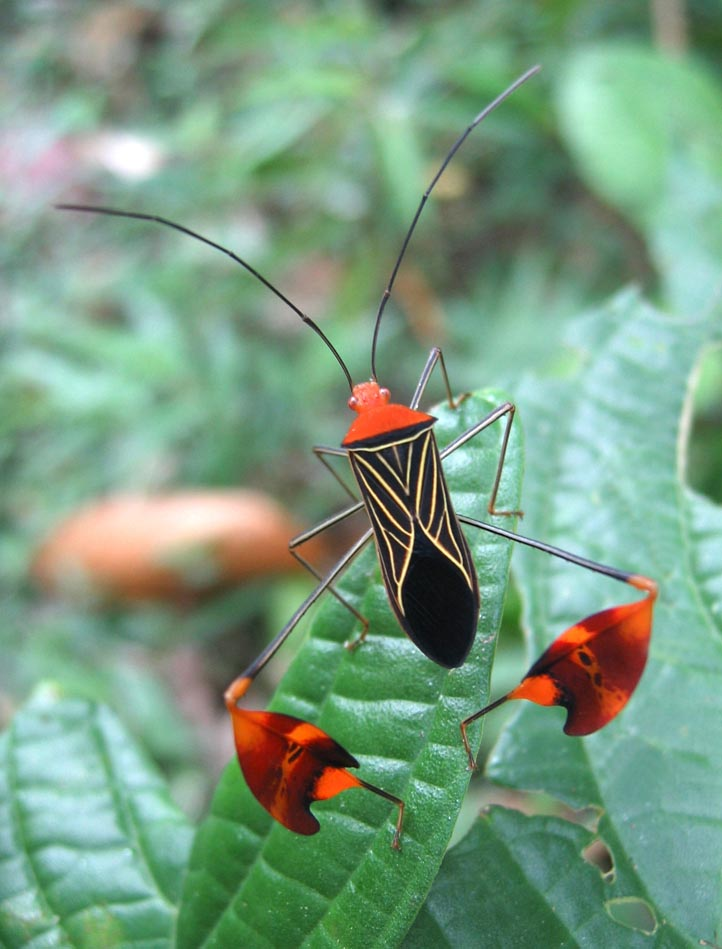
A "leaf-footed" coreid (Anisoscelis flavolineata) with typical expanded hind legs

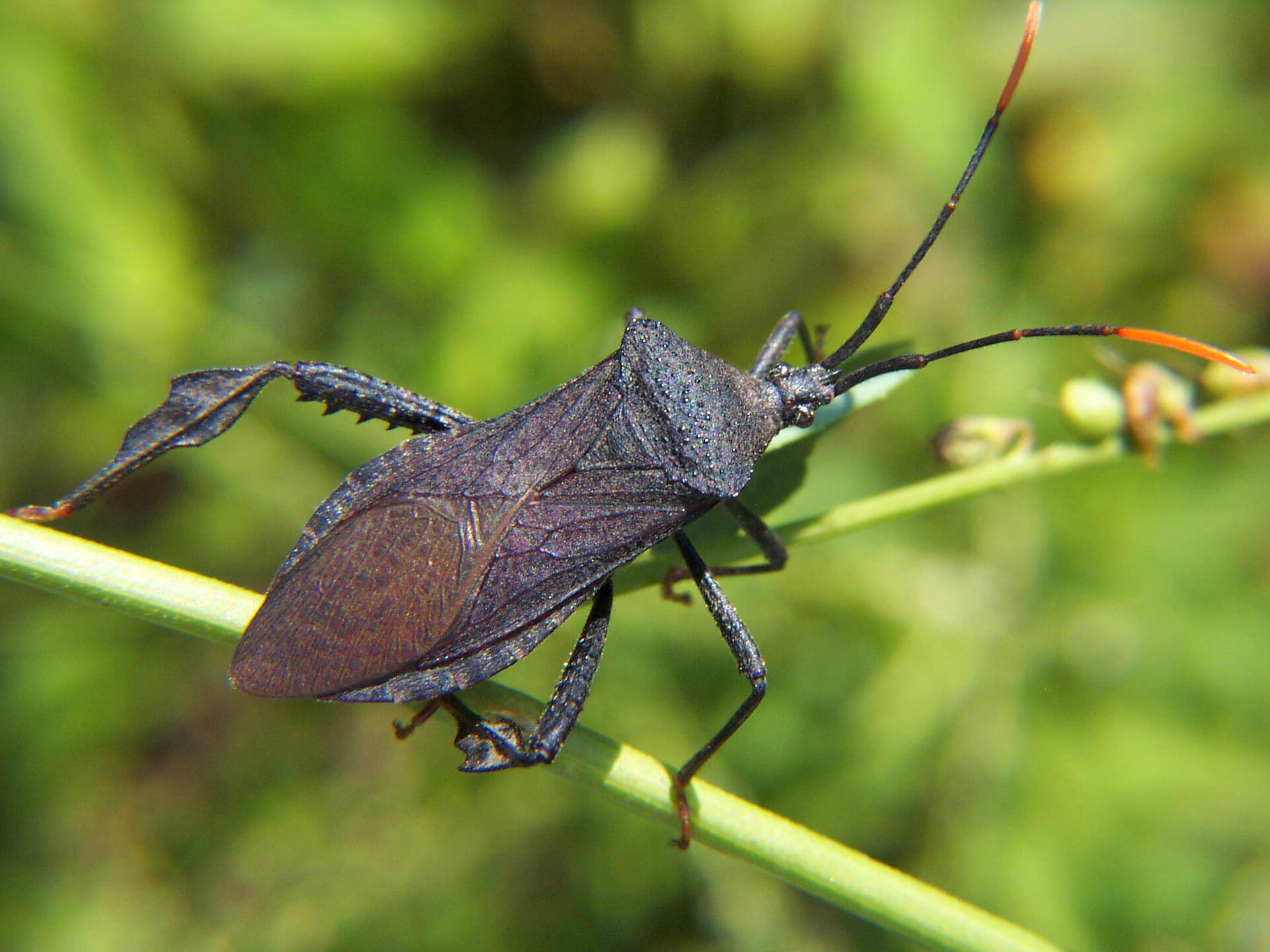
Acanthocephala terminalis

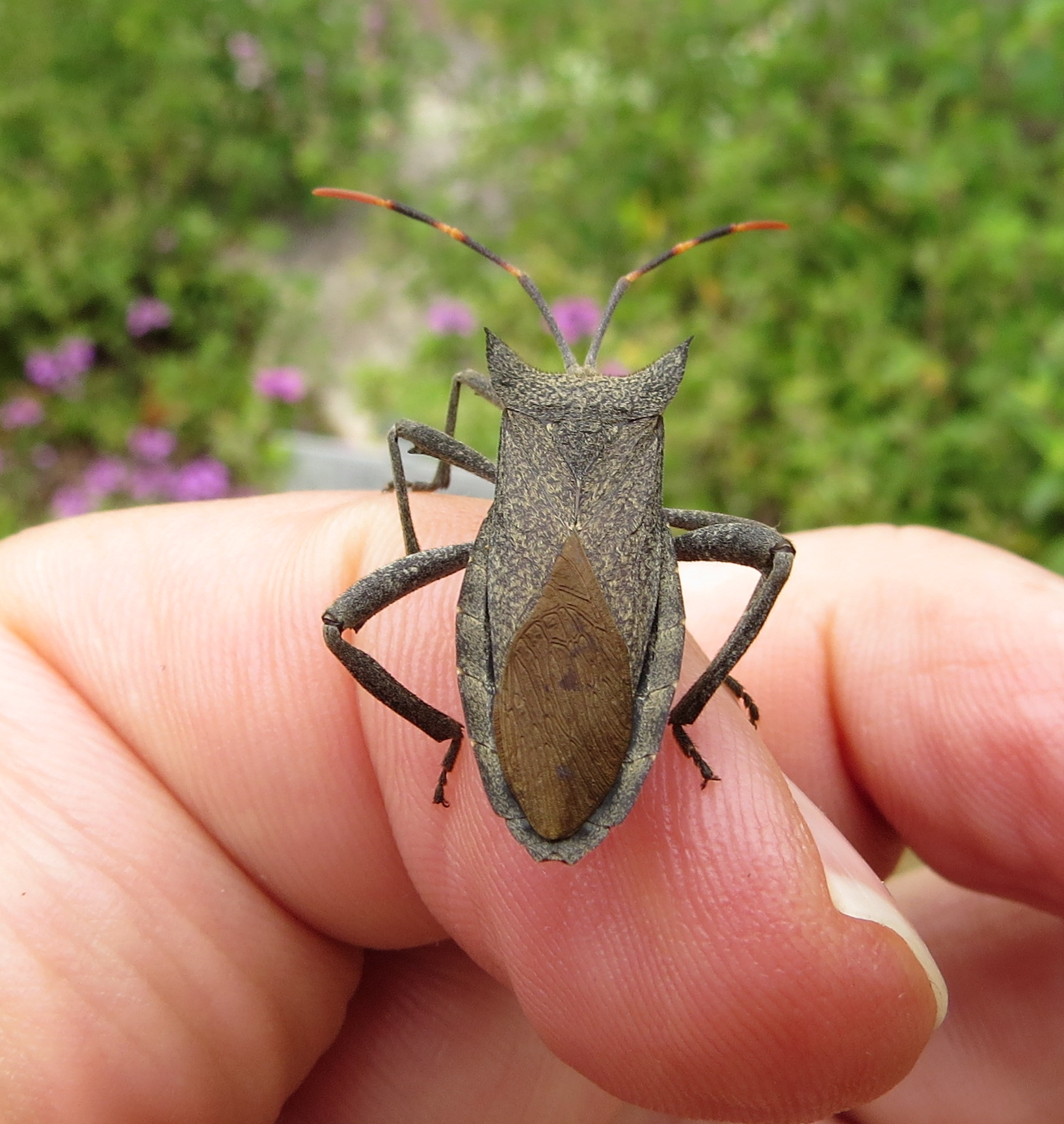
Typical pattern of wing venation

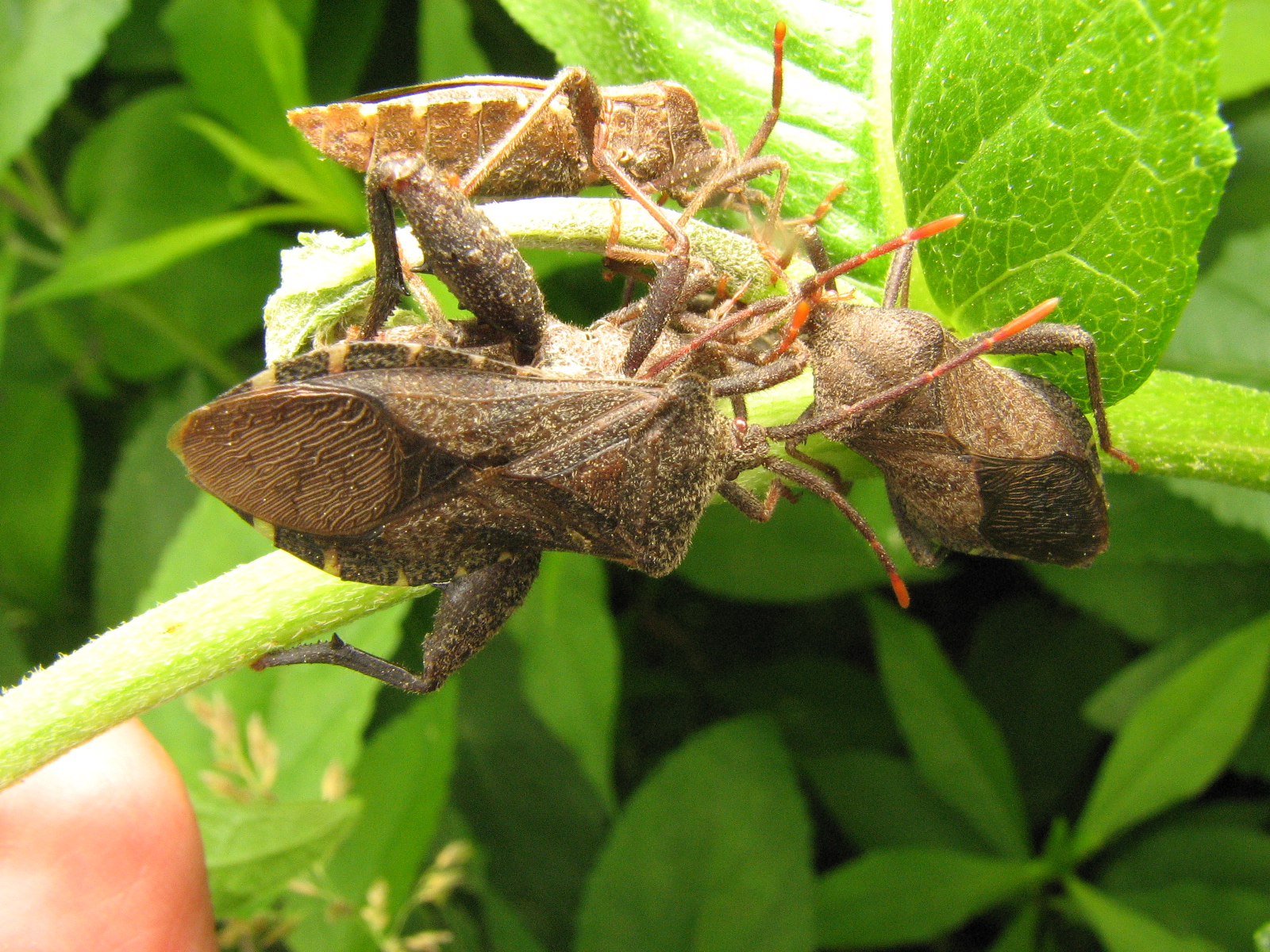
Piezogaster sp. mating

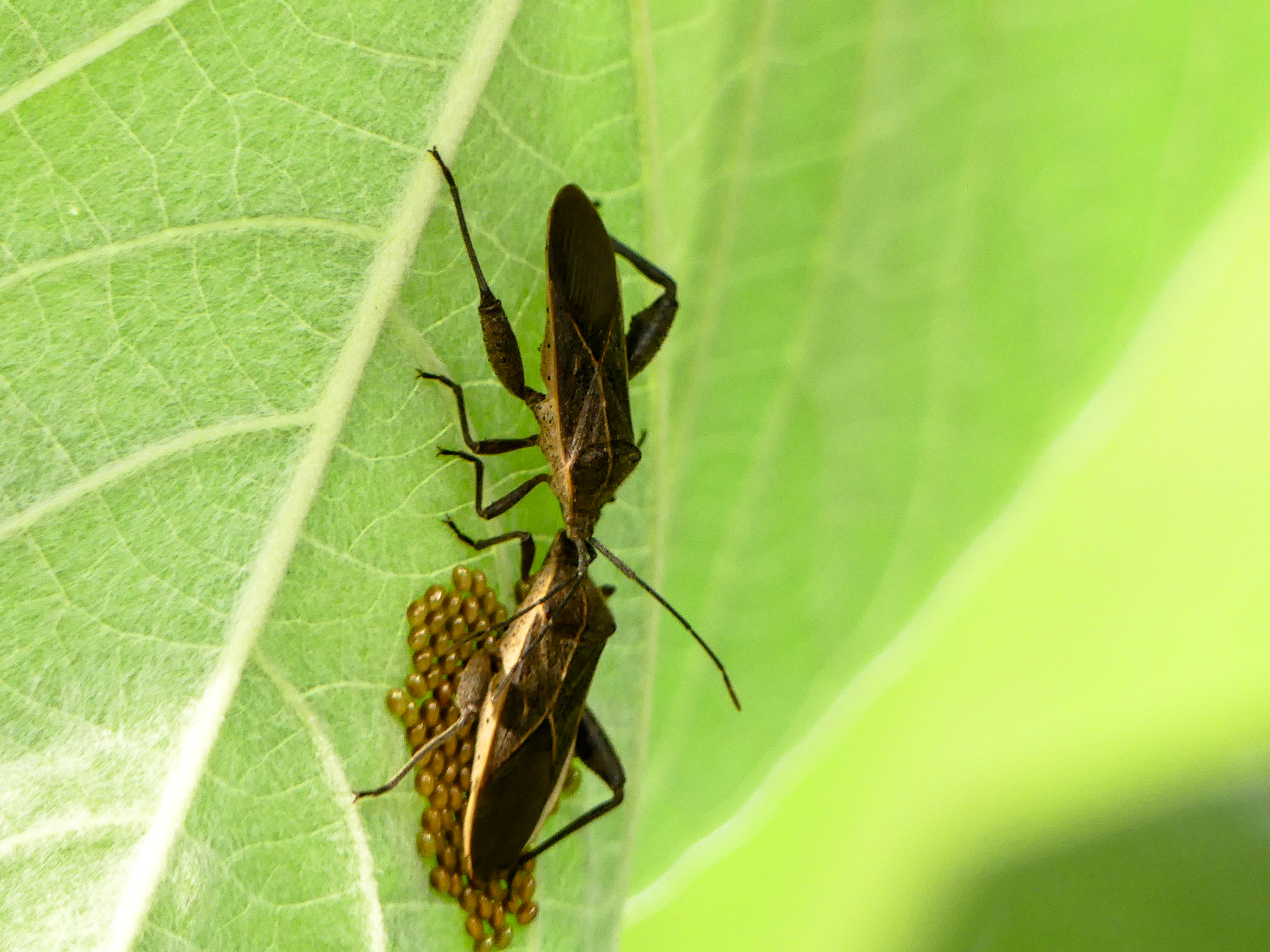
Laying eggs

Two leaf-footed bugs interact.

Leaf-footed bug climbs wind blown grass and flies off.
