= Vazquezitocoris =

Scientific classification
- Domain: Eukaryota
- Kingdom: Animalia
- Phylum: Arthropoda
- Class: Insecta
- Order: Hemiptera
- Suborder: Heteroptera
- Family: Coreidae
- Subfamily: Coreinae
- Tribe: Coreini
- Genus: Vazquezitocoris; Brailovsky, 1990

Genus of true bugs

Vazquezitocoris is a genus of leaf-footed bugs in the family Coreidae. There are about 14 described species in Vazquezitocoris.

== Species ==
These 14 species belong to the genus Vazquezitocoris:

- Vazquezitocoris abancayanus Brailovsky, 1990
- Vazquezitocoris aequilus Brailovsky & Barrera, 2012
- Vazquezitocoris andinus Brailovsky, 1990
- Vazquezitocoris aricanicus Brailovsky, 1990
- Vazquezitocoris catamarcanus Brailovsky, 1990
- Vazquezitocoris certus Brailovsky & Barrera, 2012
- Vazquezitocoris decoratulus Brailovsky, 1990
- Vazquezitocoris inflexicollis (Blöte, 1935)
- Vazquezitocoris micropterum Brailovsky, 1990
- Vazquezitocoris oroquensis Brailovsky, 1990
- Vazquezitocoris peruvianus Brailovsky, 1990
- Vazquezitocoris putrenus Brailovsky & Barrera, 2012
- Vazquezitocoris repletus (Van Duzee, 1925)
- Vazquezitocoris schuhi Brailovsky & Barrera, 2012
