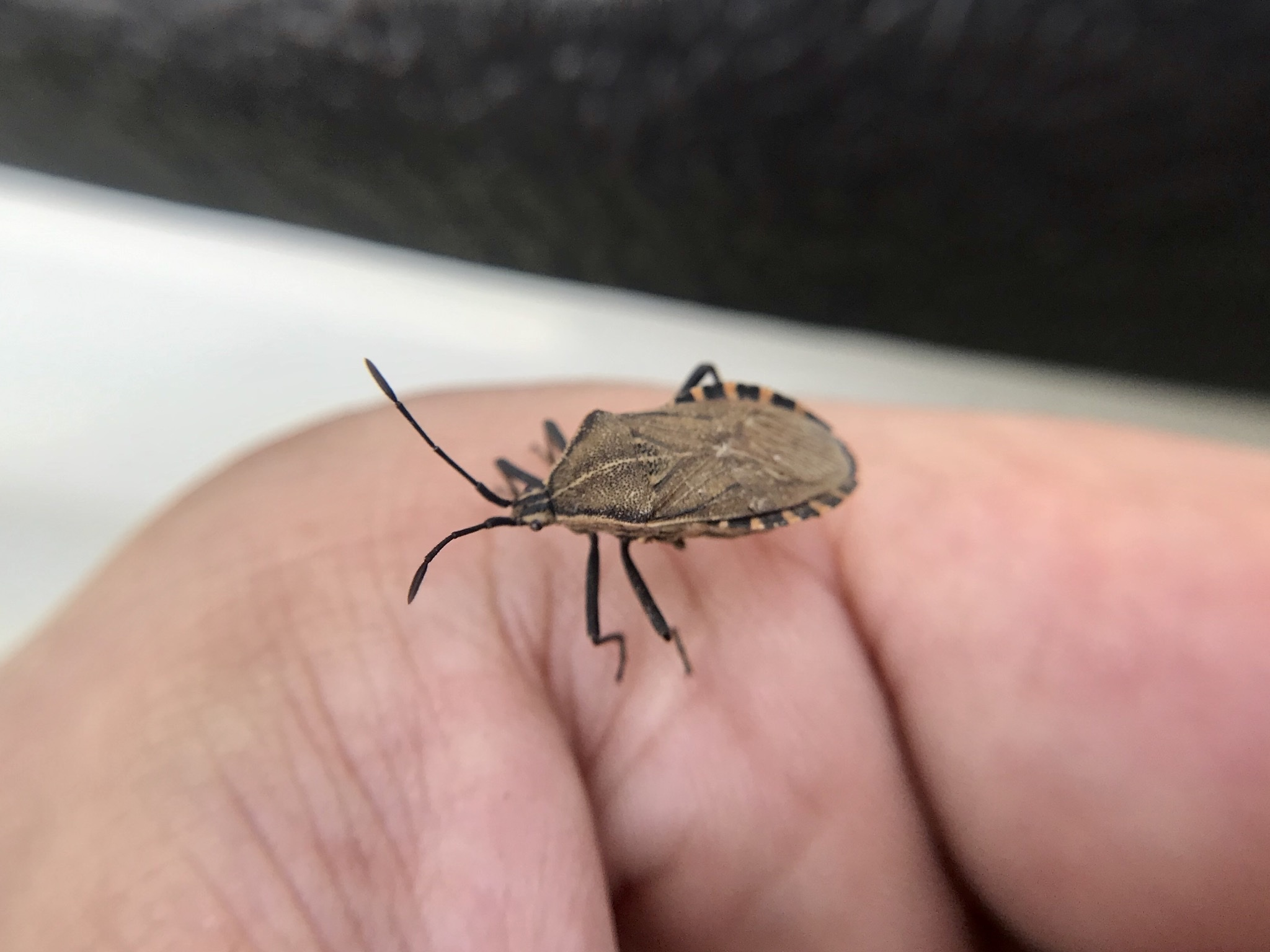

Scientific classification
- Domain: Eukaryota
- Kingdom: Animalia
- Phylum: Arthropoda
- Class: Insecta
- Order: Hemiptera
- Suborder: Heteroptera
- Family: Coreidae
- Tribe: Coreini
- Genus: Cimolus
- Species: C. luteus

Binomial name
- Cimolus luteus Brailovsky, 2001

= Cimolus luteus =

Species of true bug

Cimolus luteus is a species of leaf-footed bug in the family Coreidae. It was first described by Harry Brailovsky Alperowitz in 2001 and is found in French Guiana, Panama, Suriname, and Venezuela.
