= Nisoscolopocerus apiculatus =

Scientific classification
- Domain: Eukaryota
- Kingdom: Animalia
- Phylum: Arthropoda
- Class: Insecta
- Order: Hemiptera
- Suborder: Heteroptera
- Family: Coreidae
- Tribe: Coreini
- Genus: Nisoscolopocerus
- Species: N. apiculatus

Binomial name
- Nisoscolopocerus apiculatus Barber, 1928

Species of true bug

Nisoscolopocerus apiculatus is a species of leaf-footed bug in the family Coreidae. It is found in North America.
