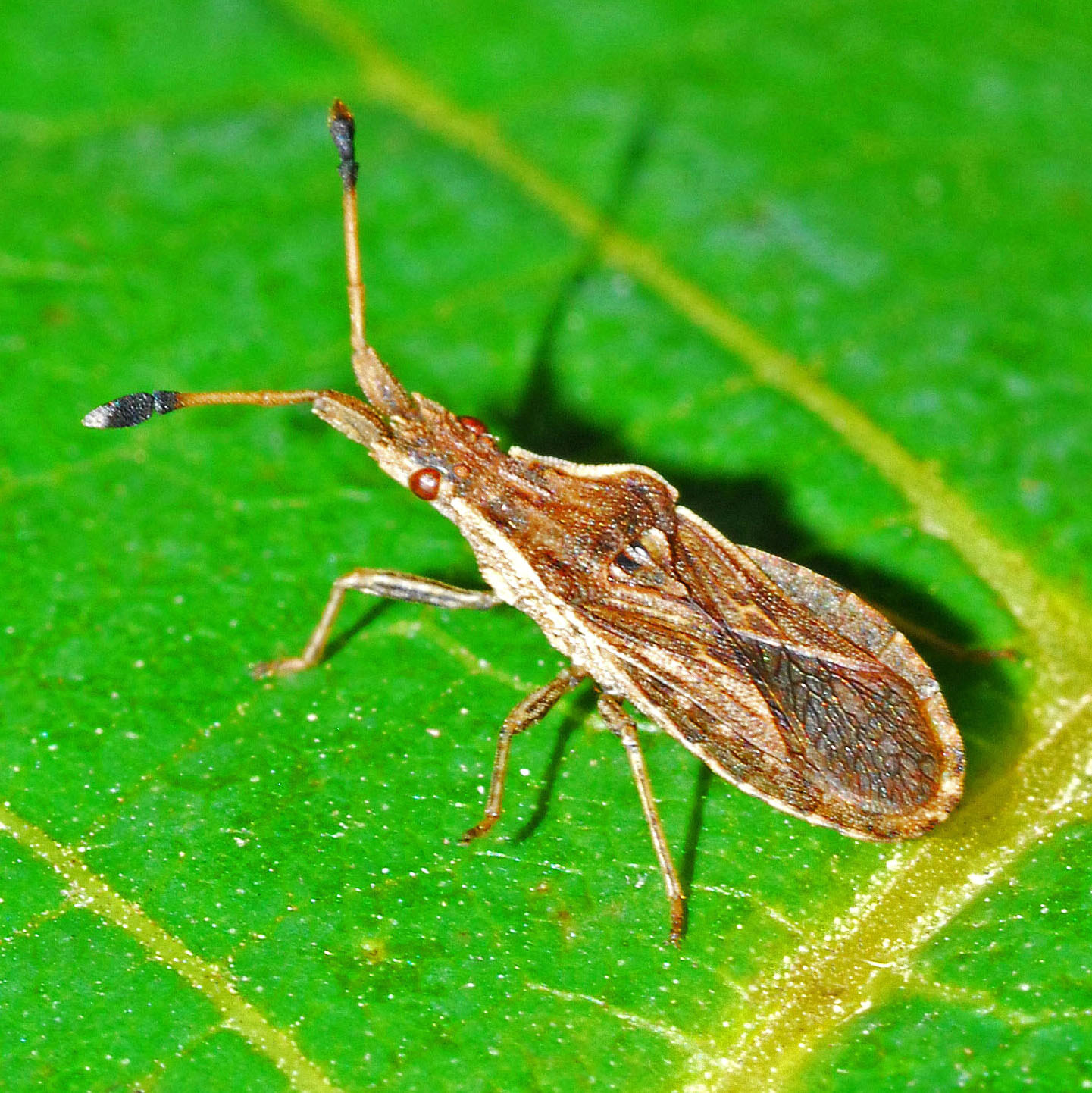
- Spathocera lobata

Scientific classification
- Kingdom: Animalia
- Phylum: Arthropoda
- Clade: Pancrustacea
- Class: Insecta
- Order: Hemiptera
- Suborder: Heteroptera
- Family: Coreidae
- Subfamily: Coreinae
- Tribe: Coreini
- Genus: Spathocera
- Species: S. lobata

Binomial name
- Spathocera lobata (Herrich-Schäffer, 1840)

Synonyms
- Pseudophloeus lobata Herrich-Schäffer, 1840

= Spathocera lobata =

Species of true bug

Spathocera lobata is a species of squashbug in the family Coreidae, tribe Coreini.

== Distribution ==
This species is present in most of Europe (Albania, Austria, Bosnia and Herzegovina, Bulgaria, Croatia, Czech Republic, France, Greece, Hungary, Italy, North Macedonia, Republic of Moldova, European Russia, Portugal, Romania, Slovakia, Slovenia, Spain, Switzerland, Ukraine and Yugoslavia), in the Near East (including Cyprus,), Transcaucasia, Central Asia and Russia (East Siberia).

== Description ==
Spathocera lobata can reach a body length of about 5–7 mm (0.20–0.28 in). These squashbugs are characterised by a rather long (much longer than wide), pale-sided pronotum. On the front of the pronotum there are six spines arranged in two transverse rows. The submedian carinae of the pronotum does not reach its base. The scutellum shows a black marking. The antennae are composed of three segments with a dilated black apex. The first segment of antennae is shorter than second.

== Biology ==
This species may have two generations per year (bivoltine). Adults can be found from April to mid June and from mid July to September. They mainly feed on Sheep's Sorrel (Rumex acetosella) and Russian dock (Rumex confertus), but also on Salvia species and Thymus species.
