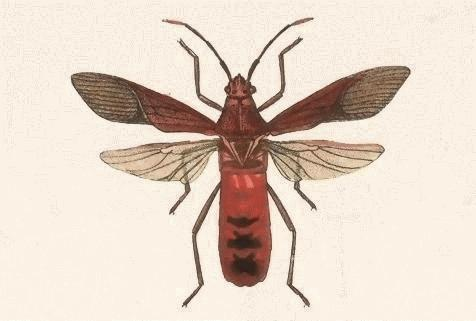

Scientific classification
- Kingdom: Animalia
- Phylum: Arthropoda
- Clade: Pancrustacea
- Class: Insecta
- Order: Hemiptera
- Suborder: Heteroptera
- Family: Coreidae
- Tribe: Coreini
- Genus: Namacus
- Species: N. annulicornis

Binomial name
- Namacus annulicornis Stål, 1870

= Namacus annulicornis =

Species of true bug

Namacus annulicornis is a species of leaf-footed bug in the family Coreidae. It is found in Central America and North America.
