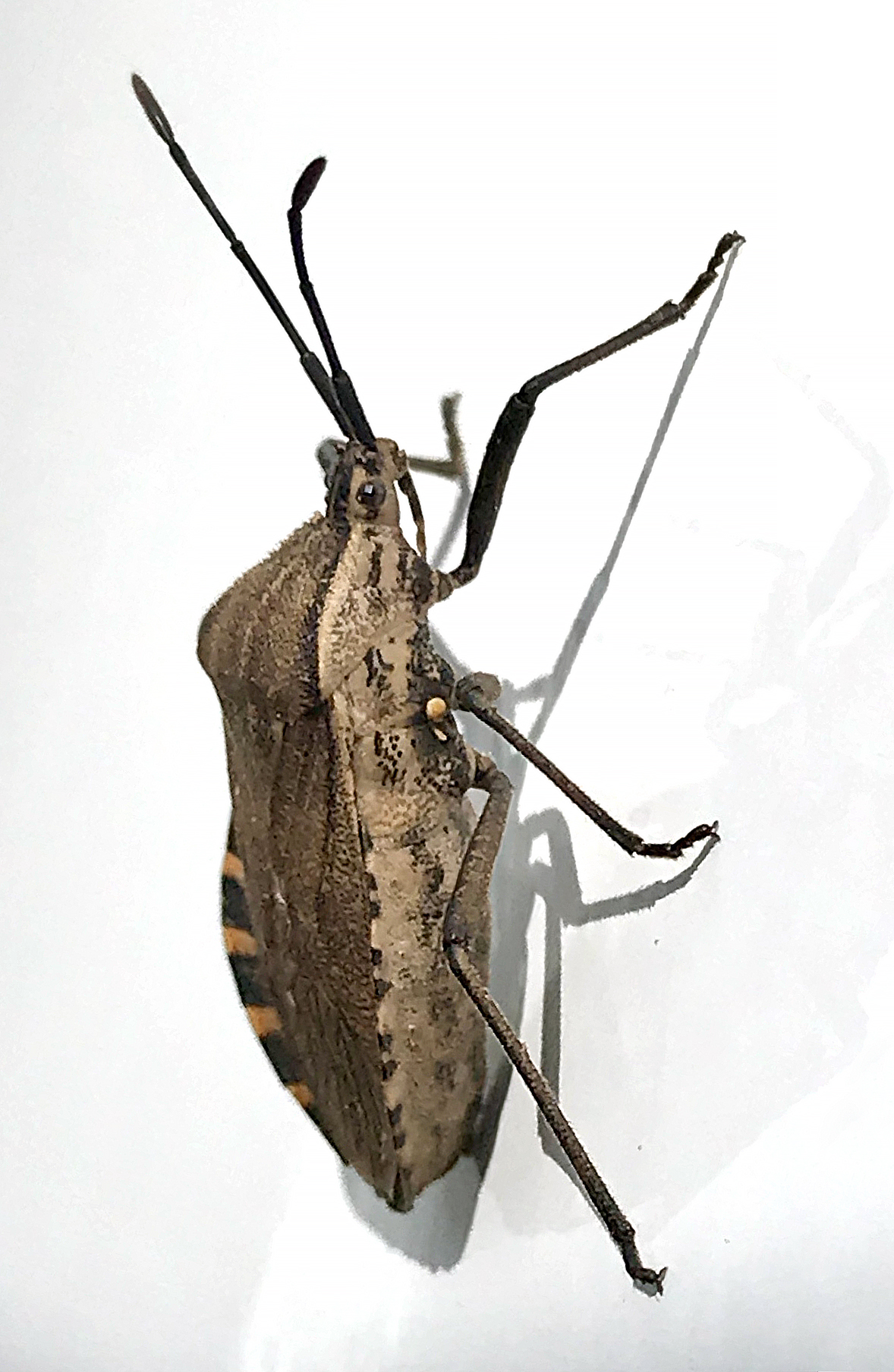

Scientific classification
- Kingdom: Animalia
- Phylum: Arthropoda
- Clade: Pancrustacea
- Class: Insecta
- Order: Hemiptera
- Suborder: Heteroptera
- Family: Coreidae
- Tribe: Coreini
- Genus: Cimolus
- Species: C. vitticeps

Binomial name
- Cimolus vitticeps Stål, 1862

= Cimolus vitticeps =

Species of true bug

Cimolus vitticeps is a species of leaf-footed bug in the family Coreidae. It was first described by Carl Stål in 1870 and is found in Panama, Costa Rica, Nicaragua and Mexico.
