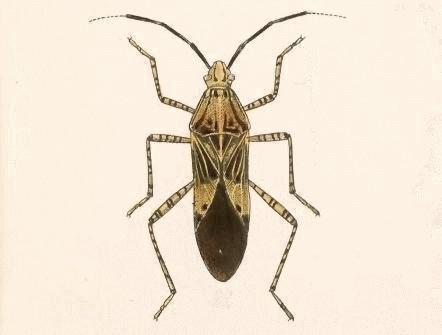

Scientific classification
- Kingdom: Animalia
- Phylum: Arthropoda
- Clade: Pancrustacea
- Class: Insecta
- Order: Hemiptera
- Suborder: Heteroptera
- Family: Coreidae
- Tribe: Coreini
- Genus: Hypselonotus
- Species: H. punctiventris

Binomial name
- Hypselonotus punctiventris Stål, 1862

= Hypselonotus punctiventris =

Species of true bug

Hypselonotus punctiventris, the spot-sided coreid, is a species of leaf-footed bug in the family Coreidae. It is found in Central America and North America.
