= Vazquezitocoris repletus =

Scientific classification
- Domain: Eukaryota
- Kingdom: Animalia
- Phylum: Arthropoda
- Class: Insecta
- Order: Hemiptera
- Suborder: Heteroptera
- Family: Coreidae
- Tribe: Coreini
- Genus: Vazquezitocoris
- Species: V. repletus

Binomial name
- Vazquezitocoris repletus (Van Duzee, 1925)

Species of true bug

Vazquezitocoris repletus is a species of leaf-footed bug in the family Coreidae. It is found in Central America and North America.
