= Catorhintha texana =

Scientific classification
- Kingdom: Animalia
- Phylum: Arthropoda
- Clade: Pancrustacea
- Class: Insecta
- Order: Hemiptera
- Suborder: Heteroptera
- Family: Coreidae
- Tribe: Coreini
- Genus: Catorhintha
- Species: C. texana

Binomial name
- Catorhintha texana Stål, 1870

Synonyms
- Catorhintha selector texana Stål, 1870

Species of true bug

Catorhintha texana is a species of leaf-footed bug in the family Coreidae. It is found in Central America and North America.
