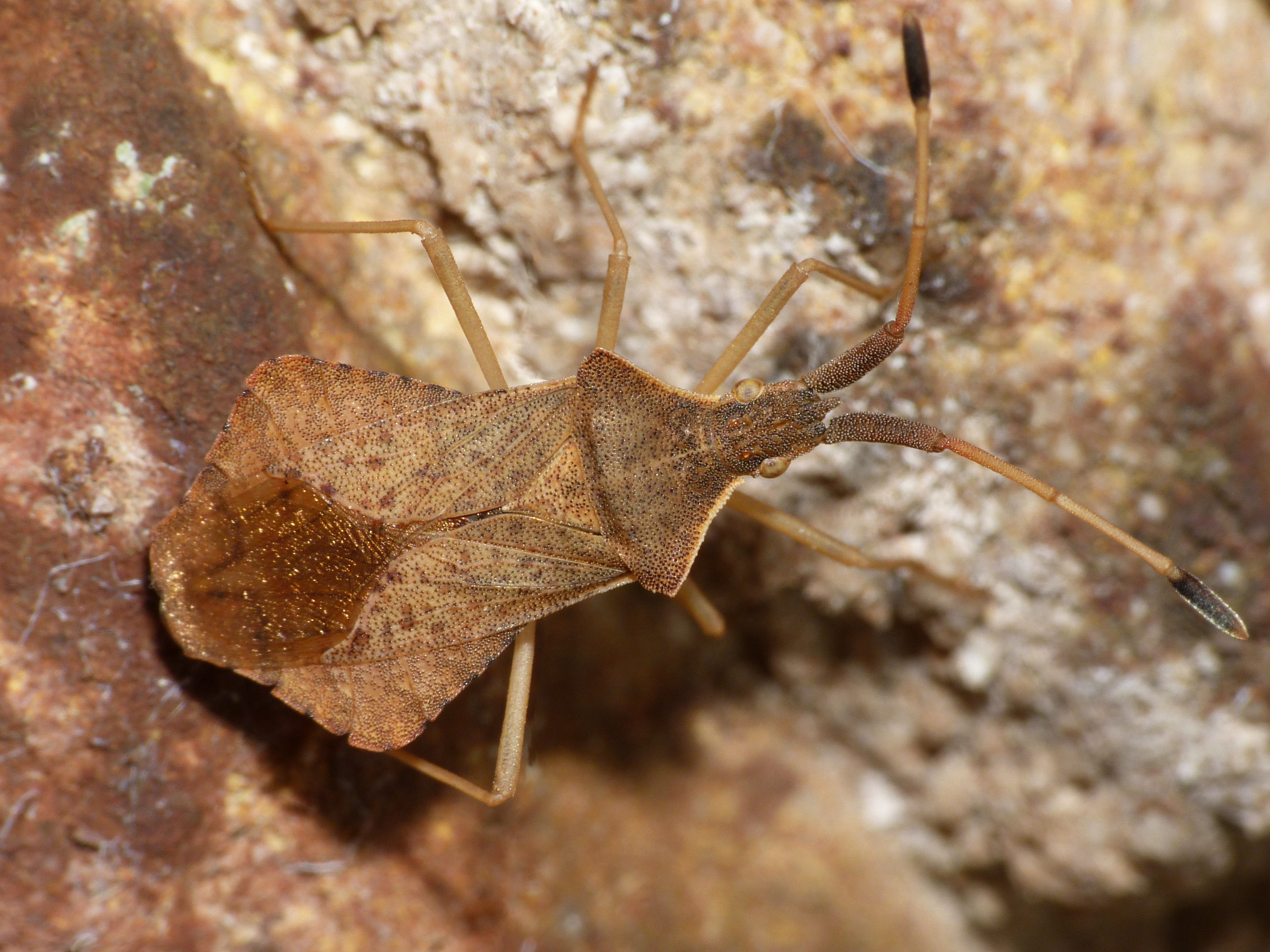

Scientific classification
- Kingdom: Animalia
- Phylum: Arthropoda
- Clade: Pancrustacea
- Class: Insecta
- Order: Hemiptera
- Suborder: Heteroptera
- Family: Coreidae
- Subfamily: Coreinae
- Tribe: Coreini
- Genus: Syromastus
- Species: S. rhombeus

Binomial name
- Syromastus rhombeus (Carl Linnaeus, 1767)

Synonyms
- Syromastes rhombeus Latreille, 1830

= Syromastus rhombeus =

Species of true bug

Syromastus rhombeus, sometimes called the "rhombic leatherbug" is a species of European bugs in the family Coreidae, tribe Coreini.
