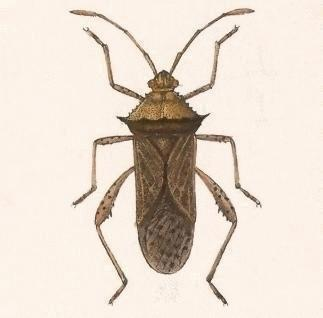

Scientific classification
- Domain: Eukaryota
- Kingdom: Animalia
- Phylum: Arthropoda
- Class: Insecta
- Order: Hemiptera
- Suborder: Heteroptera
- Family: Coreidae
- Tribe: Coreini
- Genus: Zicca
- Species: Z. taeniola

Binomial name
- Zicca taeniola (Dallas, 1852)

= Zicca taeniola =

Species of true bug

Zicca taeniola is a species of leaf-footed bug in the family Coreidae. It is found in Central America, North America, South America, and the Caribbean.
