= Cimolus obscurus =

Scientific classification
- Kingdom: Animalia
- Phylum: Arthropoda
- Clade: Pancrustacea
- Class: Insecta
- Order: Hemiptera
- Suborder: Heteroptera
- Family: Coreidae
- Tribe: Coreini
- Genus: Cimolus
- Species: C. obscurus

Binomial name
- Cimolus obscurus Stål, 1870

Species of true bug

Cimolus obscurus is a species of leaf-footed bug in the family Coreidae. It is found in North America.
