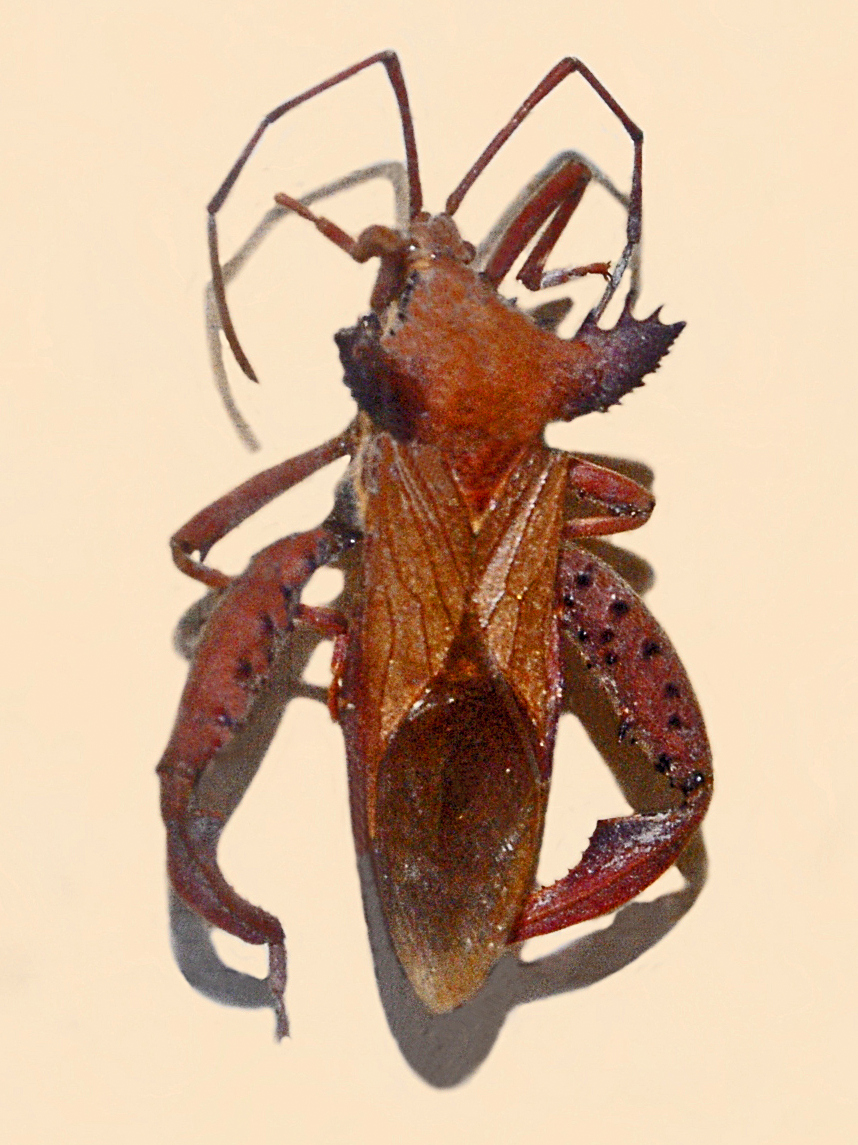
- Prionolomia heros

Scientific classification
- Kingdom: Animalia
- Phylum: Arthropoda
- Clade: Pancrustacea
- Class: Insecta
- Order: Hemiptera
- Suborder: Heteroptera
- Family: Coreidae
- Subfamily: Coreinae
- Genus: Prionolomia; Stal, 1873

Synonyms
- Prioptychomia Breddin, 1903

= Prionolomia =

Genus of true bugs

Prionolomia is a genus of the squash bugs belonging to the family Coreidae.

== Species ==
- Prionolomia baudoni Dispons, 1962
- Prionolomia cardoni Lethierry, 1891
- Prionolomia euryptera (Breddin, 1903)
- Prionolomia expansa (Stål, 1871)
- Prionolomia fulvicornis (Fabricius, 1787)
- Prionolomia gigas Distant, 1879
- Prionolomia heros (Fabricius, 1794)
- Prionolomia malaya (Stål, 1865)
- Prionolomia porrigens (Walker, 1871)
- Prionolomia rudis Blöte, 1938
- Prionolomia truncata (Walker, 1871)
- Prionolomia villiersi Dispons, 1962
- Prionolomia yunnanensis Dispons, 1962
