= Mirabilis albida =

Scientific classification
- Kingdom: Plantae
- Clade: Tracheophytes
- Clade: Angiosperms
- Clade: Eudicots
- Order: Caryophyllales
- Family: Nyctaginaceae
- Genus: Mirabilis
- Species: M. albida

Binomial name
- Mirabilis albida (Walter) Heimerl

Species of plant

Mirabilis albida, called white four o'clock, mountain four o'clock, hairy four o'clock, hairy umbrellawort, pale four o'clock, pale umbrellawort, or dwarf four o'clock, is a perennial forb found in grassland throughout North America.

== Description ==
Mirabilis albida varies widely throughout its range. Generally, it grows up to 5 feet long and the stems may stand erect or grow outward. The leaves are lance or egg shaped and are clustered mostly on the lowest part of the stem. The stem, leaves and flowers are hairy. The flowers are tubular and 5-lobed, and can be white, red, pink, or violet. M. albida blooms from August to October and, just like the rest of the four o'clock family, the flowers open only in the late afternoon. The fruit is a brown, hairy caryopsis.

== Habitat ==
Mirabilis albida grows in dry, well-drained soil in open, sunny areas such as grassland, pasture, open woodland, and rocky bluffs.

== Ecology ==
Mirabilis albida is a larval host for the moth Neoheliodines nyctaginella and the leaf-footed bug Catorhintha mendica. It is a source of nectar for bees, hummingbirds, moths, and other pollinators.

== Taxonomy ==
Previous scientific names used for Mirabilis albida include Allionia albida, Allionia bracteata, Allionia coahuilensis, Allionia grayana, Allionia pauciflora, Allionia pseudaggregata, Allionia rotata, Mirabilis coahuilensis, Mirabilis dumetorum, Mirabilis entricha, Mirabilis grayana, Mirabilis oblongifolia, Mirabilis pauciflora, Mirabilis pseudoaggregata, Mirabilis rotata, Oxybaphus albidus, Oxybaphus coahuilensis, Oxybaphus pauciflorus, Oxybaphus pseudoaggregatus, and Oxybaphus rotatus.
