= Catorhintha guttula =

Scientific classification
- Domain: Eukaryota
- Kingdom: Animalia
- Phylum: Arthropoda
- Class: Insecta
- Order: Hemiptera
- Suborder: Heteroptera
- Family: Coreidae
- Tribe: Coreini
- Genus: Catorhintha
- Species: C. guttula

Binomial name
- Catorhintha guttula (Fabricius, 1794)

Synonyms
- Lygaeus guttula Fabricius, 1794

Species of true bug

Catorhintha guttula is a species of leaf-footed bug in the family Coreidae. It is found in the Caribbean Sea, Central America, North America, and South America.
