= Catorhintha flava =

Scientific classification
- Domain: Eukaryota
- Kingdom: Animalia
- Phylum: Arthropoda
- Class: Insecta
- Order: Hemiptera
- Suborder: Heteroptera
- Family: Coreidae
- Tribe: Coreini
- Genus: Catorhintha
- Species: C. flava

Binomial name
- Catorhintha flava Fracker, 1923

Species of true bug

Catorhintha flava is a species of leaf-footed bug in the family Coreidae. It is found in Central America & North America.
