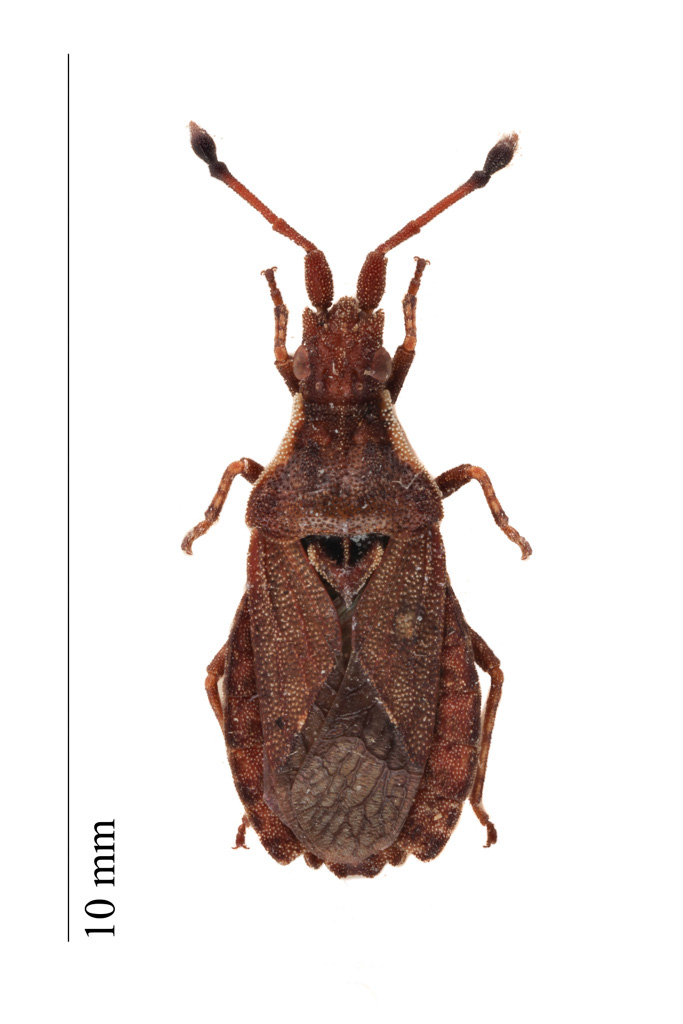
- Adult

Scientific classification
- Kingdom: Animalia
- Phylum: Arthropoda
- Class: Insecta
- Order: Hemiptera
- Suborder: Heteroptera
- Family: Coreidae
- Subfamily: Coreinae
- Tribe: Coreini
- Genus: Spathocera
- Species: S. dalmanii

Binomial name
- Spathocera dalmanii (Schilling, 1829)

Synonyms
- Coreus dahlmannii Schilling, 1829; Coreus dalmanii Schilling, 1829

= Spathocera dalmanii =

Species of true bug

Spathocera dalmanii, known as Dalman's leatherbug, is a species of insect in the family Coreidae, tribe Coreini. It is native to Europe.

== Description ==
Spathocera dalmanii is brown with a long, pale-sided pronotum. There are no spines on the antennae, head, or pronotum. The scutellum has two wedge-shaped black markings.

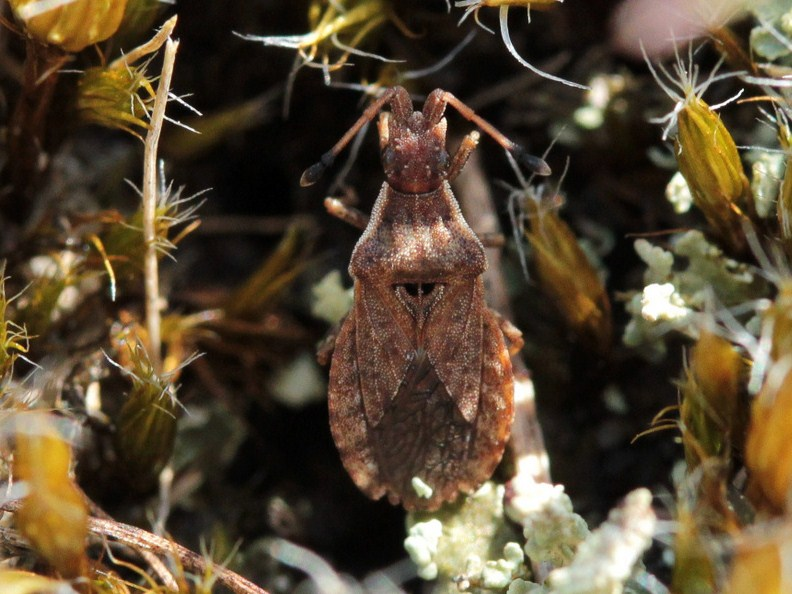
Adult

== Ecology and behavior ==
This bug feeds on sheep's sorrel, Rumex acetosella. The adults move slowly and rarely fly.

There may be two generations per year in warmer areas.
