= Scolopocerus secundarius =

Scientific classification
- Domain: Eukaryota
- Kingdom: Animalia
- Phylum: Arthropoda
- Class: Insecta
- Order: Hemiptera
- Suborder: Heteroptera
- Family: Coreidae
- Tribe: Coreini
- Genus: Scolopocerus
- Species: S. secundarius

Binomial name
- Scolopocerus secundarius Uhler, 1875

Species of true bug

Scolopocerus secundarius is a species of leaf-footed bug in the family Coreidae. It is found in Central America and North America.
