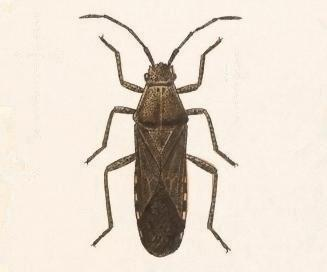
- Catorhintha mendica

Scientific classification
- Domain: Eukaryota
- Kingdom: Animalia
- Phylum: Arthropoda
- Class: Insecta
- Order: Hemiptera
- Suborder: Heteroptera
- Family: Coreidae
- Subfamily: Coreinae
- Tribe: Coreini
- Genus: Catorhintha; Stål, 1859

Synonyms
- Ficana Stål, 1862

= Catorhintha =

Genus of true bugs

Catorhintha is a genus of leaf-footed bugs in the family Coreidae. There are more than 30 described species in Catorhintha.

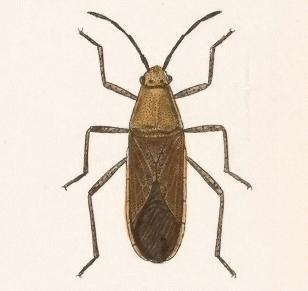
Catorhintha selector

== Species ==
These 32 species belong to the genus Catorhintha:

- Catorhintha abdita Brailovsky & Garcia, 1987
- Catorhintha apicalis (Dallas, 1852)
- Catorhintha bellatula Brailovsky & Barrera, 2010
- Catorhintha bicornigera Brailovsky & Barrera, 2010
- Catorhintha borinquensis Barber, 1923
- Catorhintha bos Blöte, 1935
- Catorhintha divergens Barber, 1926
- Catorhintha duplicata Brailovsky & Garcia, 1987
- Catorhintha elongatula Brailovsky, 1983
- Catorhintha festiva Brailovsky & Garcia, 1987
- Catorhintha flava Fracker, 1923
- Catorhintha guttula (Fabricius, 1794)
- Catorhintha kifunei Brailovsky & Garcia, 1987
- Catorhintha kormilevi Brailovsky & Garcia, 1987
- Catorhintha lucida Brailovsky & Garcia, 1987
- Catorhintha mendica Stal, 1870
- Catorhintha minor Valdés, 1911
- Catorhintha occulta Brailovsky & Garcia, 1987
- Catorhintha ocreata Brailovsky & Garcia, 1987
- Catorhintha omissa Brailovsky & Garcia, 1987
- Catorhintha pallida Mayr, 1865
- Catorhintha perfida Stål, 1860
- Catorhintha schaffneri Brailovsky & Garcia, 1987
- Catorhintha selector Stål, 1859
- Catorhintha semialba (Walker, 1872)
- Catorhintha siblica Brailovsky & Garcia, 1987
- Catorhintha sinuatipennis Berg, 1892
- Catorhintha sticta Brailovsky & Barrera, 2010
- Catorhintha tamaulipeca Brailovsky & Barrera, 2010
- Catorhintha texana Stål, 1870
- Catorhintha tumula Brailovsky & Barrera, 2010
- Catorhintha viridipes Blatchley, 1926
