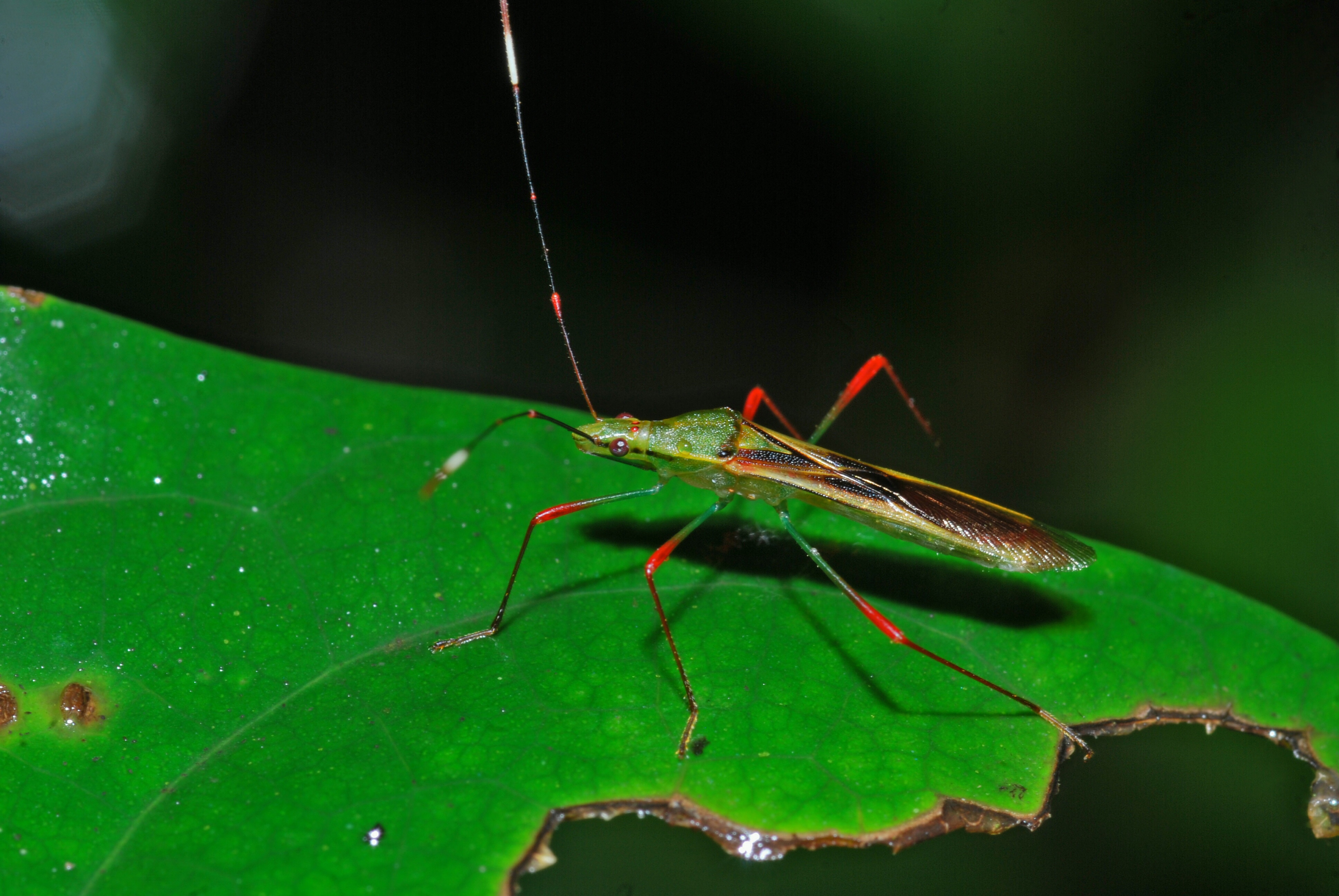

Scientific classification
- Kingdom: Animalia
- Phylum: Arthropoda
- Class: Insecta
- Order: Hemiptera
- Suborder: Heteroptera
- Family: Alydidae
- Tribe: Leptocorisini
- Genus: Stenocoris; Burmeister, 1839

= Stenocoris =

Genus of insects

Stenocoris is a genus of rice bugs in the family Alydidae. There are more than 20 described species in Stenocoris, found in Africa and the Americas,

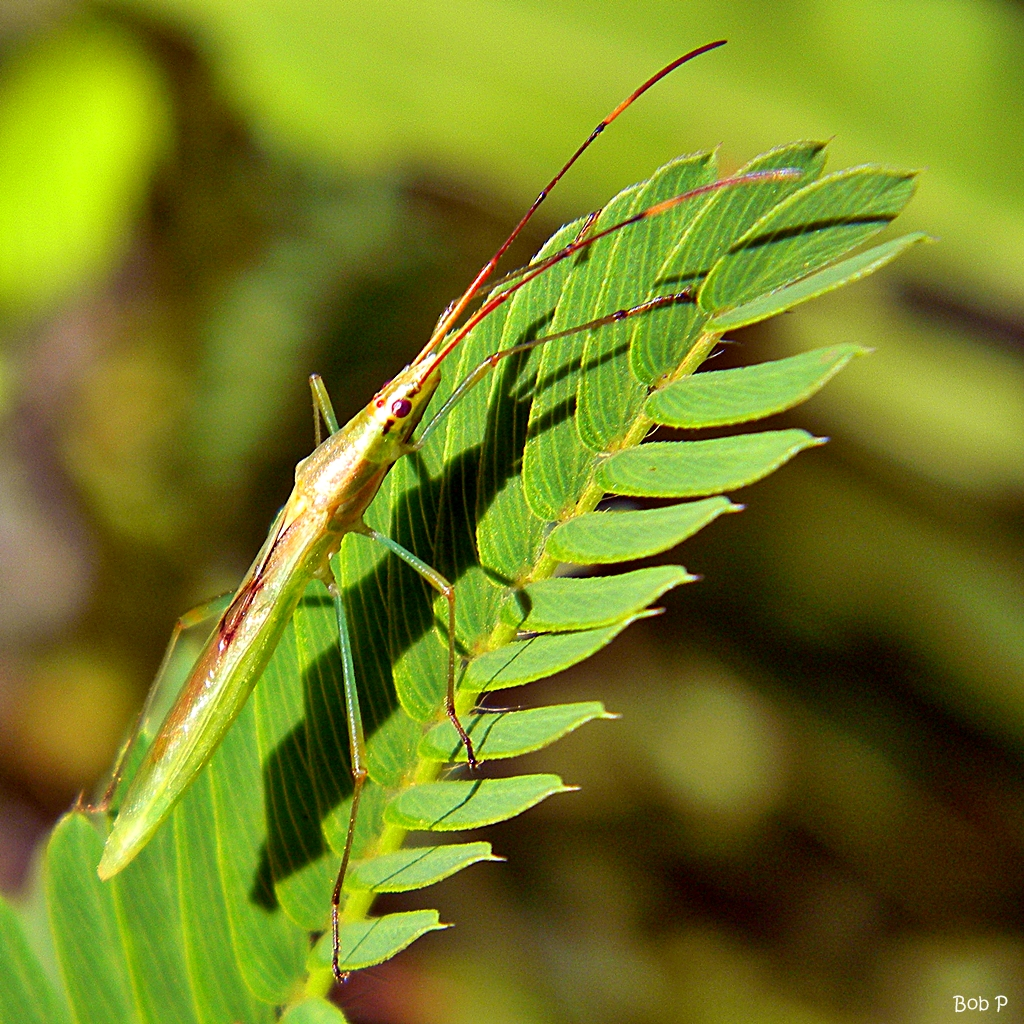
Rice bugs, Stenocoris

== Species ==
These 22 species belong to the genus Stenocoris:

- Stenocoris africanus Ahmad, 1965
- Stenocoris americanus Ahmad, 1965
- Stenocoris annulicornis (Signoret, 1861)
- Stenocoris apicalis (Westwood, 1842)
- Stenocoris braziliensis Ahmad, 1965
- Stenocoris claviformis Ahmad, 1965
- Stenocoris elegans (Blöte, 1937)
- Stenocoris erraticus (Blöte, 1937)
- Stenocoris ethiopis Ahmad, 1965
- Stenocoris fabricii Ahmad, 1965
- Stenocoris filiformis (Fabricius, 1775)
- Stenocoris furcifera (Westwood, 1842)
- Stenocoris maculosus (Blöte, 1937)
- Stenocoris pallidus (Blöte, 1937)
- Stenocoris phthisicus (Gerstaecker, 1873)
- Stenocoris schaeferi Montemayor & Dellapé, 2011
- Stenocoris similis Blöte, 1937
- Stenocoris sordidus (Blöte, 1937)
- Stenocoris southwoodi Ahmad, 1965
- Stenocoris stali Ahmad, 1965
- Stenocoris tipuloides (De Geer, 1773) (neotropical rice bug)
- Stenocoris v-nigrum (Blöte, 1937)
