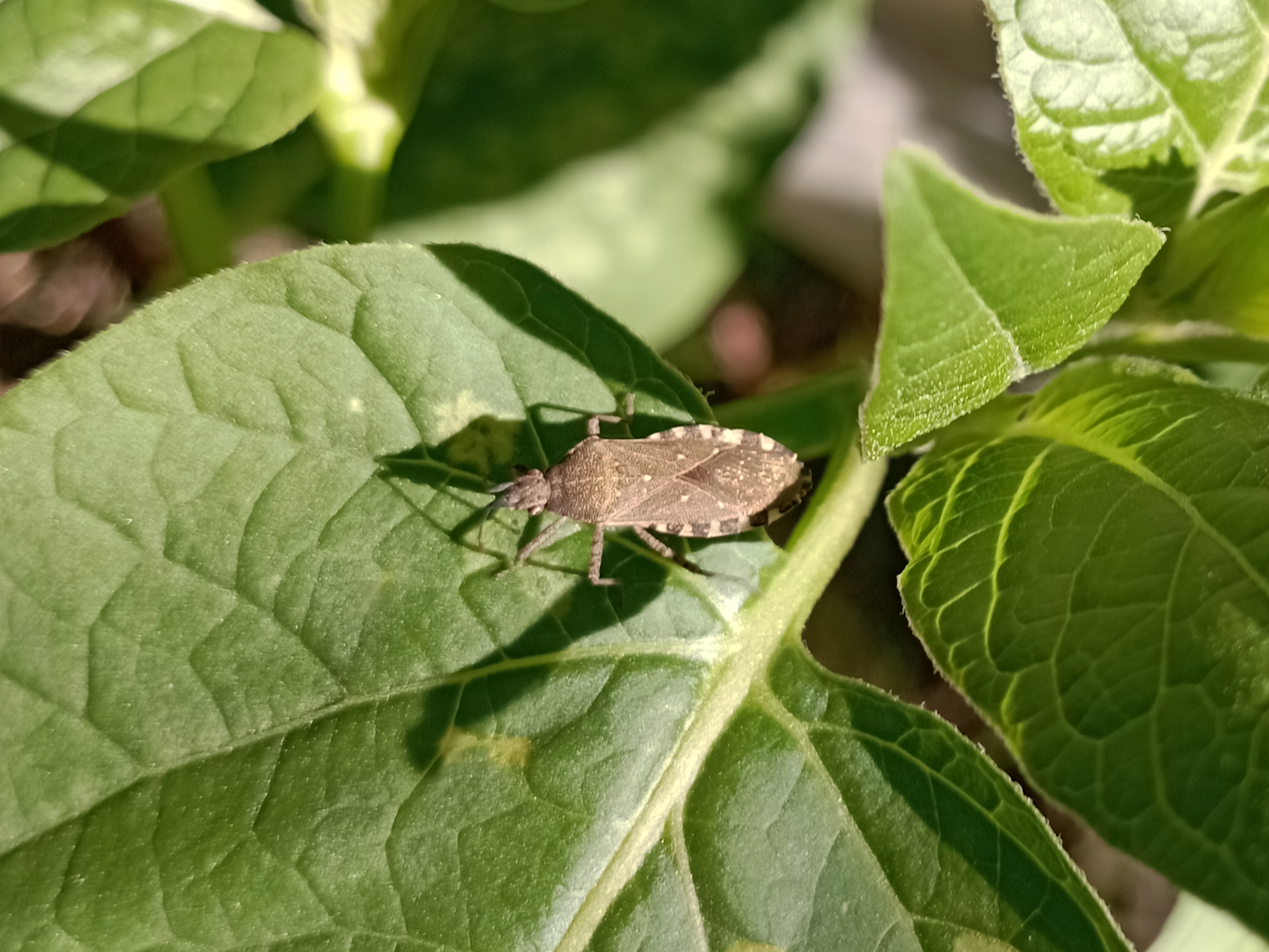

Scientific classification
- Kingdom: Animalia
- Phylum: Arthropoda
- Clade: Pancrustacea
- Class: Insecta
- Order: Hemiptera
- Suborder: Heteroptera
- Family: Coreidae
- Tribe: Coreini
- Genus: Catorhintha
- Species: C. apicalis

Binomial name
- Catorhintha apicalis (Dallas, 1852)

Synonyms
- Ficana apicalis (Dallas, 1852); Gonocerus apicalis Dallas, 1852

= Catorhintha apicalis =

Species of true bug

Catorhintha apicalis is a species of leaf-footed bug in the family Coreidae.
