= Sethenira ferruginea =

Scientific classification
- Domain: Eukaryota
- Kingdom: Animalia
- Phylum: Arthropoda
- Class: Insecta
- Order: Hemiptera
- Suborder: Heteroptera
- Family: Coreidae
- Tribe: Coreini
- Genus: Sethenira
- Species: S. ferruginea

Binomial name
- Sethenira ferruginea Stal, 1870

Species of true bug

Sethenira ferruginea is a species of leaf-footed bug in the family Coreidae. It is found in the Caribbean Sea, Central America, and North America.
