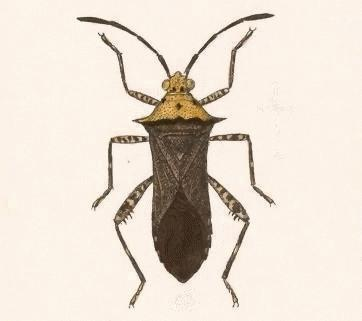
- Zicca commaculata

Scientific classification
- Kingdom: Animalia
- Phylum: Arthropoda
- Clade: Pancrustacea
- Class: Insecta
- Order: Hemiptera
- Suborder: Heteroptera
- Family: Coreidae
- Subfamily: Coreinae
- Tribe: Coreini
- Genus: Zicca; Amyot & Serville, 1843

= Zicca =

Genus of true bugs

Zicca is a genus of leaf-footed bugs in the family Coreidae. There are about 19 described species in the genus Zicca.

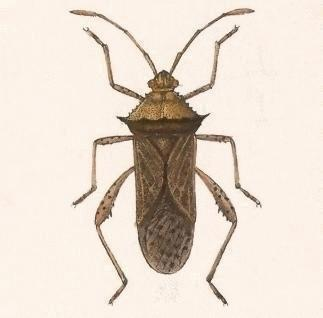
Zicca taeniola

== Species ==
These 19 species belong to the genus Zicca:

- Zicca acetabularia Brailovsky & Cadena, 1992
- Zicca annulata (Burmeister, 1835)
- Zicca commaculata Distant, 1881
- Zicca consobrina Stål, 1860
- Zicca cornuta Stål, 1860
- Zicca erratica Brailovsky & Cadena, 1992
- Zicca gigas Brailovsky & Cadena, 1992
- Zicca impicta Blöte, 1935
- Zicca inornata Breddin, 1902
- Zicca nigropunctata (De Geer, 1773)
- Zicca pacificae Brailovsky & Cadena, 1992
- Zicca paramerana Brailovsky & Cadena, 1992
- Zicca pronotata Brailovsky & Cadena, 1992
- Zicca pulchra (Stål, 1855)
- Zicca rubricator (Fabricius, 1803)
- Zicca signoreti Lethierry & Severin, 1894
- Zicca spurca Brailovsky & Cadena, 1992
- Zicca stali Berg, 1879
- Zicca taeniola (Dallas, 1852)
