= Nisoscolopocerus =

Scientific classification
- Domain: Eukaryota
- Kingdom: Animalia
- Phylum: Arthropoda
- Class: Insecta
- Order: Hemiptera
- Suborder: Heteroptera
- Family: Coreidae
- Subfamily: Coreinae
- Tribe: Coreini
- Genus: Nisoscolopocerus; Barber, 1928

Genus of true bugs

Nisoscolopocerus is a genus of leaf-footed bugs in the family Coreidae. There are at least two described species in Nisoscolopocerus.

== Species ==
These two species belong to the genus Nisoscolopocerus:

- Nisoscolopocerus apiculatus Barber, 1928
- Nisoscolopocerus schuhi Brailovsky, 2012
