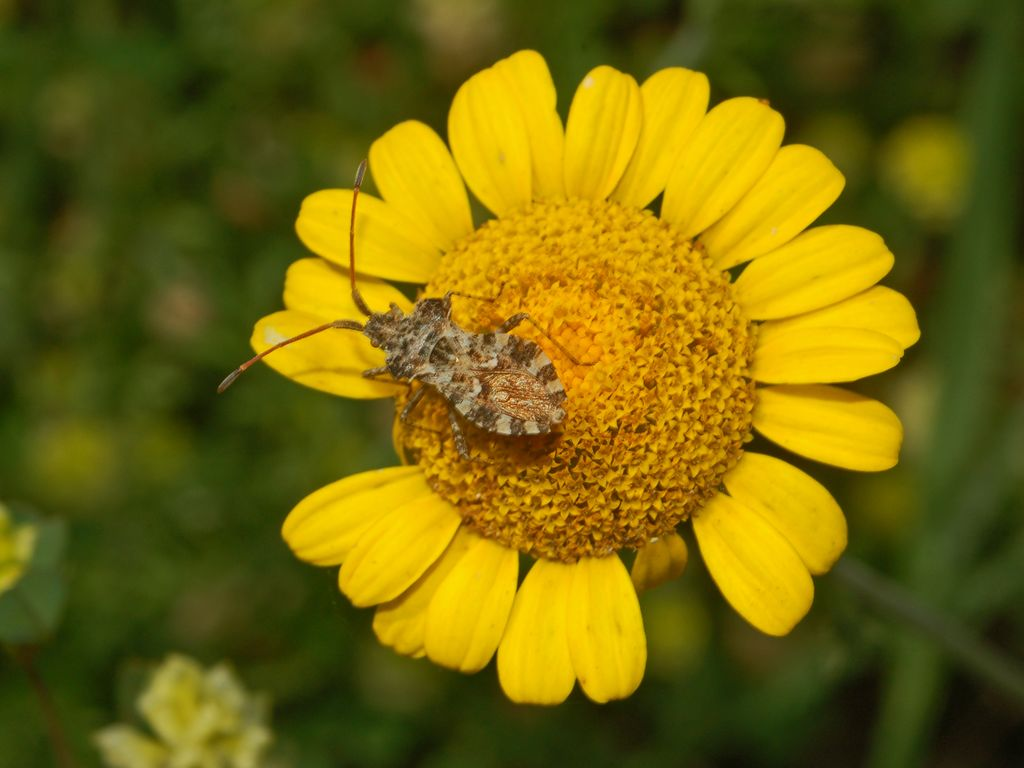
- Centrocoris spiniger

Scientific classification
- Domain: Eukaryota
- Kingdom: Animalia
- Phylum: Arthropoda
- Class: Insecta
- Order: Hemiptera
- Suborder: Heteroptera
- Family: Coreidae
- Subfamily: Coreinae
- Tribe: Coreini
- Genus: Centrocoris; Kolenati, 1845

= Centrocoris =

Genus of true bugs

Centrocoris is a genus of bugs in the family Coreidae.

== Species ==
Species within this genus include:

- Centrocoris annae (Puton, 1874)
- Centrocoris degener (Puton, 1874)
- Centrocoris desertorum Linnavuori, 1960
- Centrocoris inflaticeps Kiritshenko, 1916
- Centrocoris marmottani Puton, 1887
- Centrocoris orientalis Ahmad & Shadab, 1975
- Centrocoris spiniger (Fabricius, 1781)
- Centrocoris variegatus Kolenati, 1845
- Centrocoris volxemi (Puton, 1878)
