= Stenocoris tipuloides =

Scientific classification
- Domain: Eukaryota
- Kingdom: Animalia
- Phylum: Arthropoda
- Class: Insecta
- Order: Hemiptera
- Suborder: Heteroptera
- Family: Alydidae
- Genus: Stenocoris
- Species: S. tipuloides

Binomial name
- Stenocoris tipuloides (De Geer, 1773)

Synonyms
- Cimex tipuloides De Geer, 1773

Species of insect

Stenocoris tipuloides, the neotropical rice bug, is a species of broad-headed bug in the family Alydidae. It is found in the Americas.
