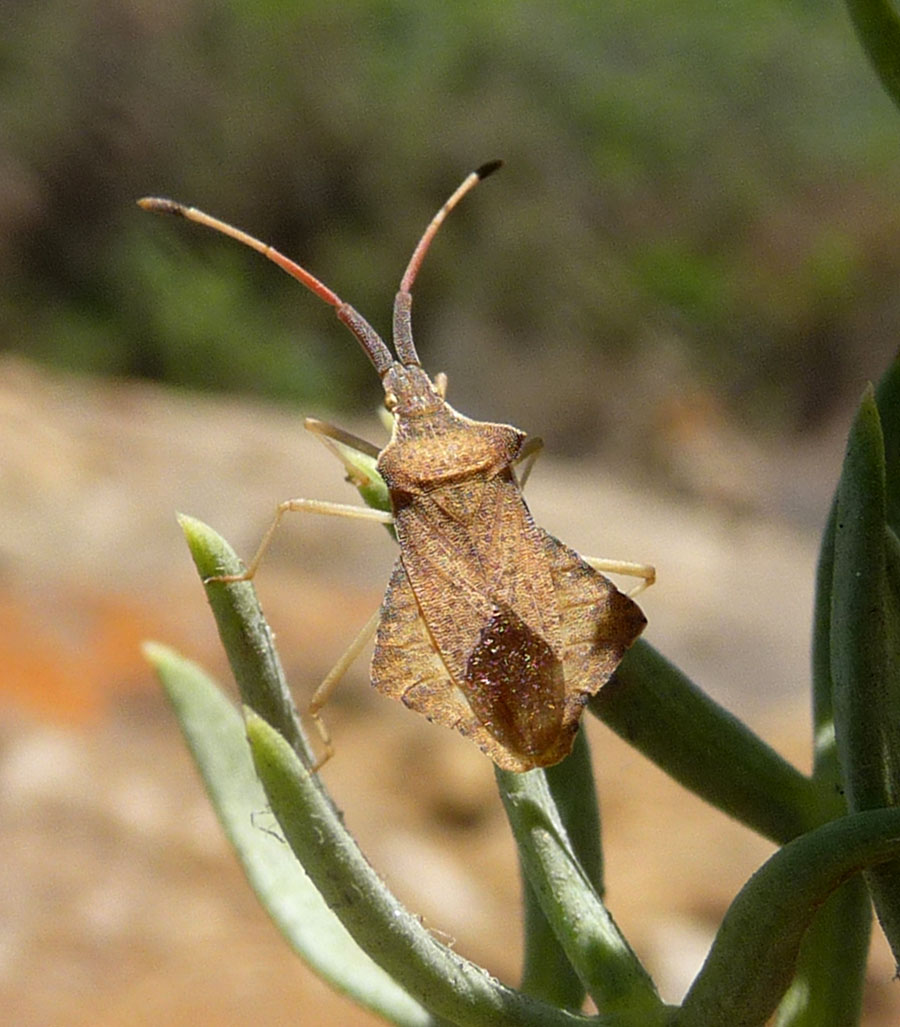
- Syromastes rhombeus

Scientific classification
- Domain: Eukaryota
- Kingdom: Animalia
- Phylum: Arthropoda
- Class: Insecta
- Order: Hemiptera
- Suborder: Heteroptera
- Superfamily: Coreoidea
- Family: Coreidae
- Subfamily: Coreinae
- Tribe: Coreini
- Genus: Syromastus; Berthold, 1827

Species
- See text

Synonyms
- Syromaster Germar, 1838; Syromastes Latreille, 1830; Verlusia Spinola, 1837

= Syromastus =

Genus of true bugs

Syromastus is a true bug genus in the family Coreidae.

== Species ==
One living (extant) species is placed within this genus, Syromastus rhombeus (Linnaeus, 1767).

=== Extinct species ===
- Syromastus affinis (Heer, 1853)
- Syromastus buchii (Heer, 1853)
- Syromastus coloratus (Heer, 1853)
- Syromastus punctiventris (Statz, 1950)
- Syromastus seyfriedi (Heer, 1853)
