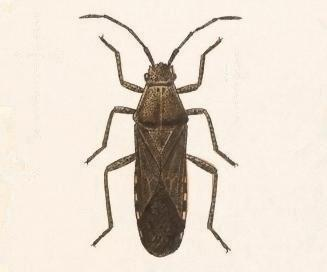

Scientific classification
- Domain: Eukaryota
- Kingdom: Animalia
- Phylum: Arthropoda
- Class: Insecta
- Order: Hemiptera
- Suborder: Heteroptera
- Family: Coreidae
- Tribe: Coreini
- Genus: Catorhintha
- Species: C. mendica

Binomial name
- Catorhintha mendica Stal, 1870

= Catorhintha mendica =

Species of true bug

Catorhintha mendica is a species of leaf-footed bug in the family Coreidae. It is found in North America.
