= Sethenira =

Scientific classification
- Domain: Eukaryota
- Kingdom: Animalia
- Phylum: Arthropoda
- Class: Insecta
- Order: Hemiptera
- Suborder: Heteroptera
- Family: Coreidae
- Subfamily: Coreinae
- Tribe: Coreini
- Genus: Sethenira; Spinola, 1837

Genus of true bugs

Sethenira is a genus of leaf-footed bugs in the family Coreidae. There are about five described species in Sethenira.

== Species ==
These five species belong to the genus Sethenira:

- Sethenira ferruginea Stal, 1870
- Sethenira grossa Brailovsky, 1988
- Sethenira rufohumerata Brailovsky, 1988
- Sethenira testacea Spinola, 1837
- Sethenira uruguayensis Berg, 1892
