= Stenocoris furcifera =

Scientific classification
- Kingdom: Animalia
- Phylum: Arthropoda
- Class: Insecta
- Order: Hemiptera
- Suborder: Heteroptera
- Family: Alydidae
- Tribe: Leptocorisini
- Genus: Stenocoris
- Species: S. furcifera

Binomial name
- Stenocoris furcifera (Westwood, 1842)

Species of true bug

Stenocoris furcifera is a species of broad-headed bug in the family Alydidae. It is found in Central America, North America, and South America.
