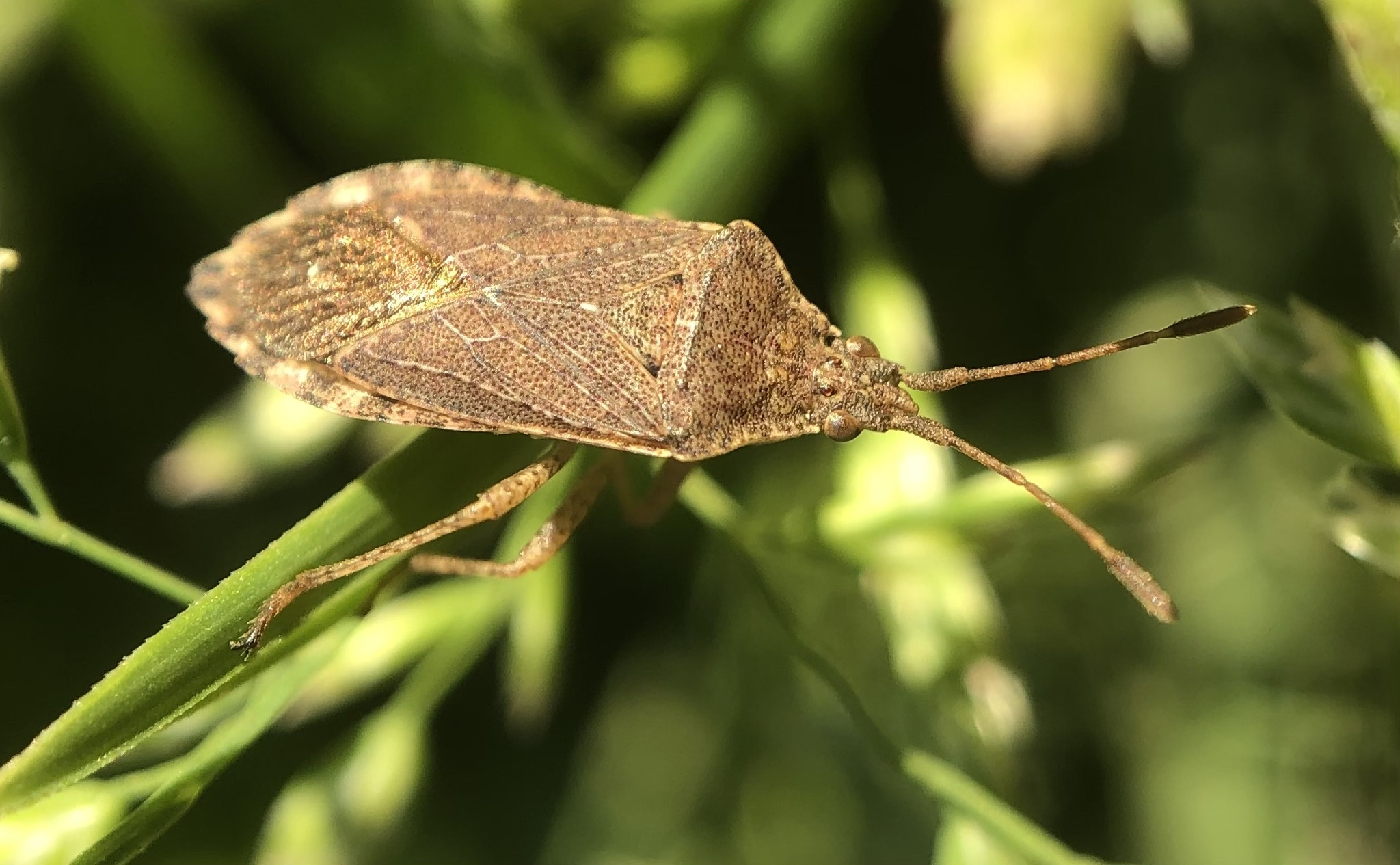

Scientific classification
- Domain: Eukaryota
- Kingdom: Animalia
- Phylum: Arthropoda
- Class: Insecta
- Order: Hemiptera
- Suborder: Heteroptera
- Family: Coreidae
- Genus: Althos
- Species: A. obscurator

Binomial name
- Althos obscurator (Fabricius, 1803)

= Althos obscurator =

Species of true bug

Althos obscurator is a species of leaf-footed bug in the family Coreidae. It is found in the Caribbean, Central America, North America, and South America.
