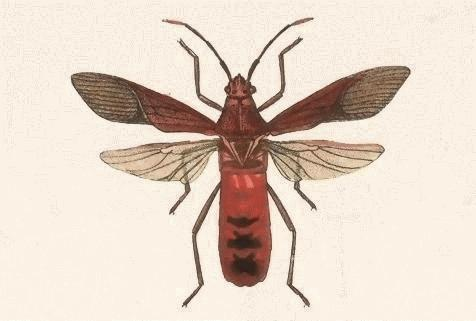
- Namacus annulicornis

Scientific classification
- Domain: Eukaryota
- Kingdom: Animalia
- Phylum: Arthropoda
- Class: Insecta
- Order: Hemiptera
- Suborder: Heteroptera
- Family: Coreidae
- Subfamily: Coreinae
- Tribe: Coreini
- Genus: Namacus; Amyot & Serville, 1843

= Namacus =

Genus of true bugs

Namacus is a genus of leaf-footed bugs in the family Coreidae. There are at least four described species in Namacus.

== Species ==
These four species belong to the genus Namacus:

- Namacus annulicornis Stål, 1870
- Namacus nympha Distant, 1913
- Namacus prominulus (Stål, 1860)
- Namacus transvirgatus Amyot & Serville, 1843
