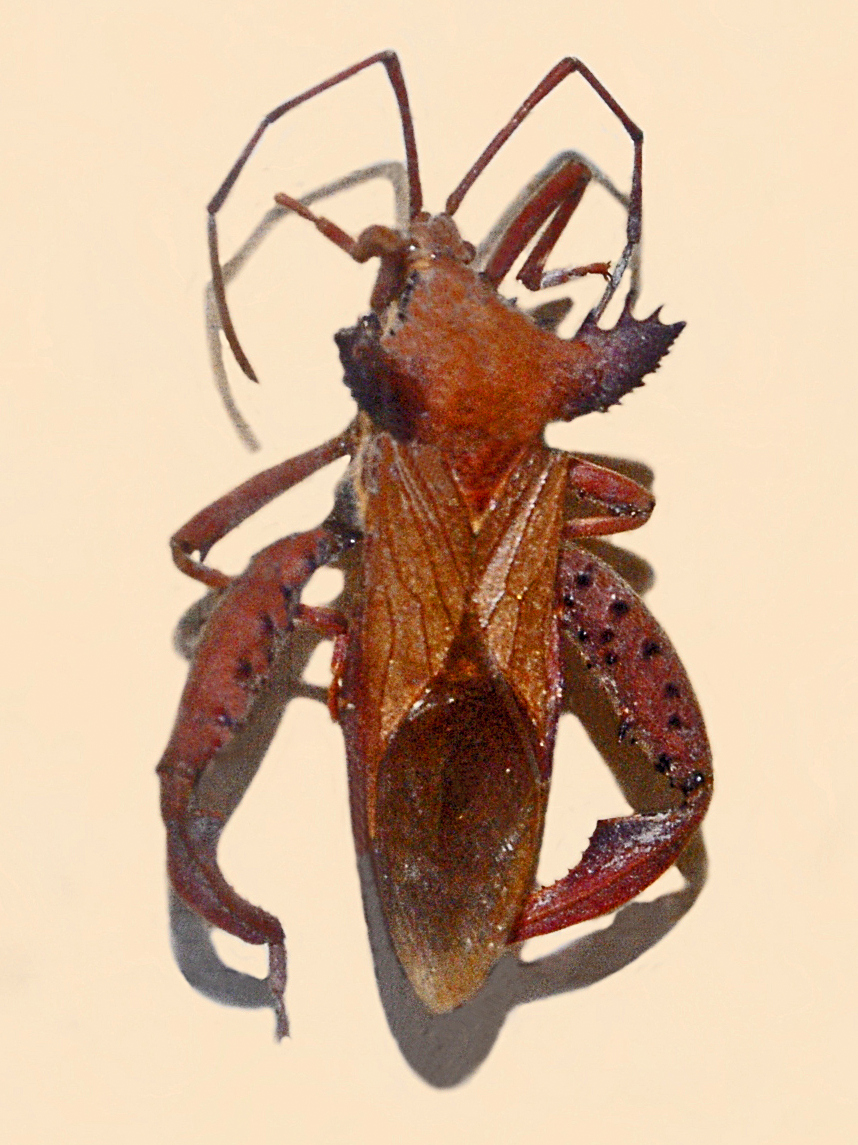
- Prionolomia heros from Sumatra

Scientific classification
- Kingdom: Animalia
- Phylum: Arthropoda
- Class: Insecta
- Order: Hemiptera
- Suborder: Heteroptera
- Family: Coreidae
- Genus: Prionolomia
- Species: P. heros

Binomial name
- Prionolomia heros (Fabricius, 1794)

Synonyms
- Prionolomia hystrix (Costa, 1863)

= Prionolomia heros =

Species of true bug

Prionolomia heros is a species of squash bugs belonging to the Coreidae family.

== Distribution ==
This species is present in Indonesia.
