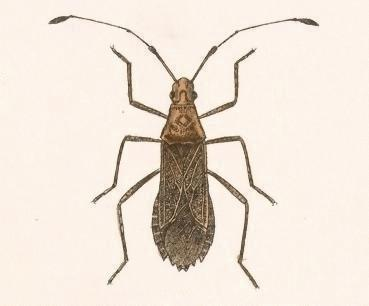
- Madura perfida

Scientific classification
- Kingdom: Animalia
- Phylum: Arthropoda
- Clade: Pancrustacea
- Class: Insecta
- Order: Hemiptera
- Suborder: Heteroptera
- Family: Coreidae
- Tribe: Coreini
- Genus: Madura; Stål, 1860

= Madura (bug) =

Genus of true bugs

Madura is a genus of leaf-footed bugs in the family Coreidae. There are at least three described species in Madura.

== Species ==
These three species belong to the genus Madura:

- Madura fuscoclavata Stål, 1860^{i c g}
- Madura longicornis Stål, 1862^{i c g}
- Madura perfida Stål, 1862^{i c g b}

Data sources: i = ITIS, c = Catalogue of Life, g = GBIF, b = Bugguide.net
