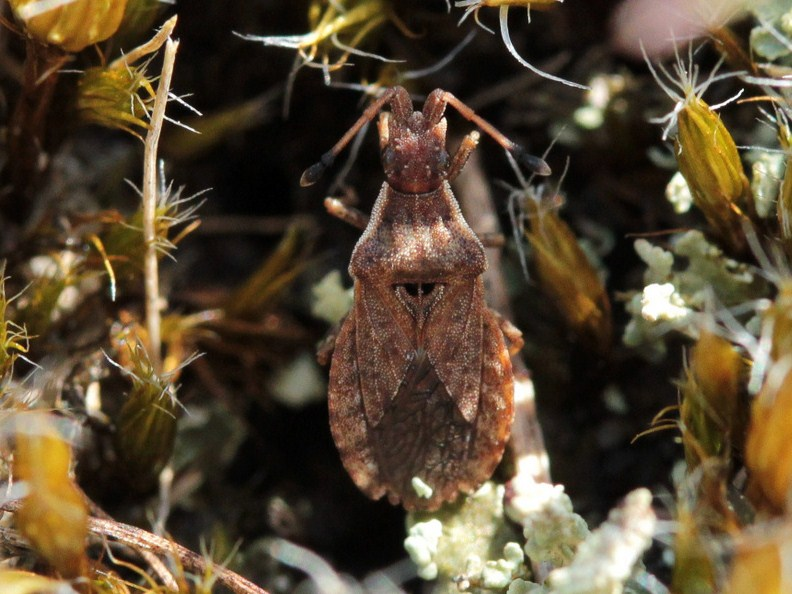
- Spathocera dalmanii

Scientific classification
- Domain: Eukaryota
- Kingdom: Animalia
- Phylum: Arthropoda
- Class: Insecta
- Order: Hemiptera
- Suborder: Heteroptera
- Family: Coreidae
- Subfamily: Coreinae
- Tribe: Coreini
- Genus: Spathocera; Stein, 1860

= Spathocera =

Genus of true bugs

Spathocera is a genus of European bugs in the family Coreidae, tribe Coreini. It includes "Dalman's leatherbug", S. dalmanii, which is fairly widely distributed, including southern England.

== Species ==
Fauna Europaea lists the following:

- Spathocera dalmanii
- Spathocera laticornis
- Spathocera lobata
- Spathocera obscura
- Spathocera stali
- Spathocera tenuicornis
- Spathocera tuberculate
