= Althos =

Scientific classification
- Domain: Eukaryota
- Kingdom: Animalia
- Phylum: Arthropoda
- Class: Insecta
- Order: Hemiptera
- Suborder: Heteroptera
- Family: Coreidae
- Subfamily: Coreinae
- Tribe: Coreini
- Genus: Althos; Kirkaldy, 1904

Genus of true bugs

Althos is a genus of leaf-footed bugs in the family Coreidae. There are more than 20 described species in Althos.

== Species ==
These 24 species belong to the genus Althos:

- Althos adustus Brailovsky, 1990
- Althos brevicornis (Breddin, 1908)
- Althos cribratissimus Brailovsky, 1990
- Althos distinctus (Signoret, 1864)
- Althos inornatus (Stål, 1862)
- Althos mesoamericanus Brailovsky, 1990
- Althos multicoloratus Brailovsky, 1990
- Althos nervosopunctatus (Signoret, 1864)
- Althos nigropunctatus (Signoret, 1864)
- Althos obscurator (Fabricius, 1803)
- Althos obscurus (Stål, 1870)
- Althos pacificus Brailovsky, 1990
- Althos pallescens (Stål, 1868)
- Althos pallidus (Jensen-Haarup, 1924)
- Althos pallipes (Dallas, 1852)
- Althos paradoxus (Brailovsky, 1982)
- Althos pectoralis (Dallas, 1852)
- Althos pericarti Brailovsky, 1990
- Althos potosinus Brailovsky, 1990
- Althos pseudoobscurus Brailovsky, 1990
- Althos puyoensis Brailovsky, 1990
- Althos sinuaticollis (Spinola, 1852)
- Althos terminalis Brailovsky, 1990
- Althos tucumanensis Brailovsky, 1990
