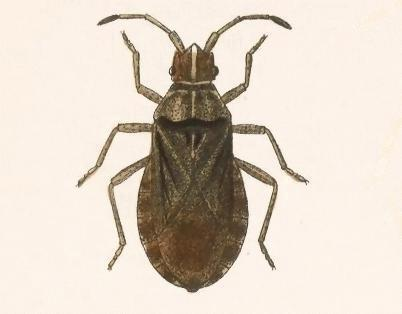

Scientific classification
- Domain: Eukaryota
- Kingdom: Animalia
- Phylum: Arthropoda
- Class: Insecta
- Order: Hemiptera
- Suborder: Heteroptera
- Family: Coreidae
- Genus: Scolopocerus
- Species: S. uhleri

Binomial name
- Scolopocerus uhleri Distant, 1881

= Scolopocerus uhleri =

Species of true bug

Scolopocerus uhleri is a species of leaf-footed bug in the family Coreidae. It is found in Central America and North America.
