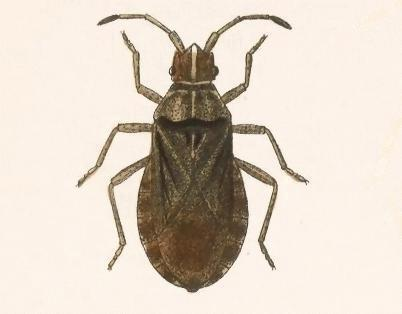
- Scolopocerus uhleri

Scientific classification
- Domain: Eukaryota
- Kingdom: Animalia
- Phylum: Arthropoda
- Class: Insecta
- Order: Hemiptera
- Suborder: Heteroptera
- Family: Coreidae
- Subfamily: Coreinae
- Tribe: Coreini
- Genus: Scolopocerus; Uhler, 1875

= Scolopocerus =

Genus of true bugs

Scolopocerus is a genus of leaf-footed bugs in the family Coreidae. There are at least four described species in Scolopocerus.

== Species ==
These four species belong to the genus Scolopocerus:

- Scolopocerus granulosus Barber, 1914
- Scolopocerus neopacificus Brailovsky, 1989
- Scolopocerus secundarius Uhler, 1875
- Scolopocerus uhleri Distant, 1881
