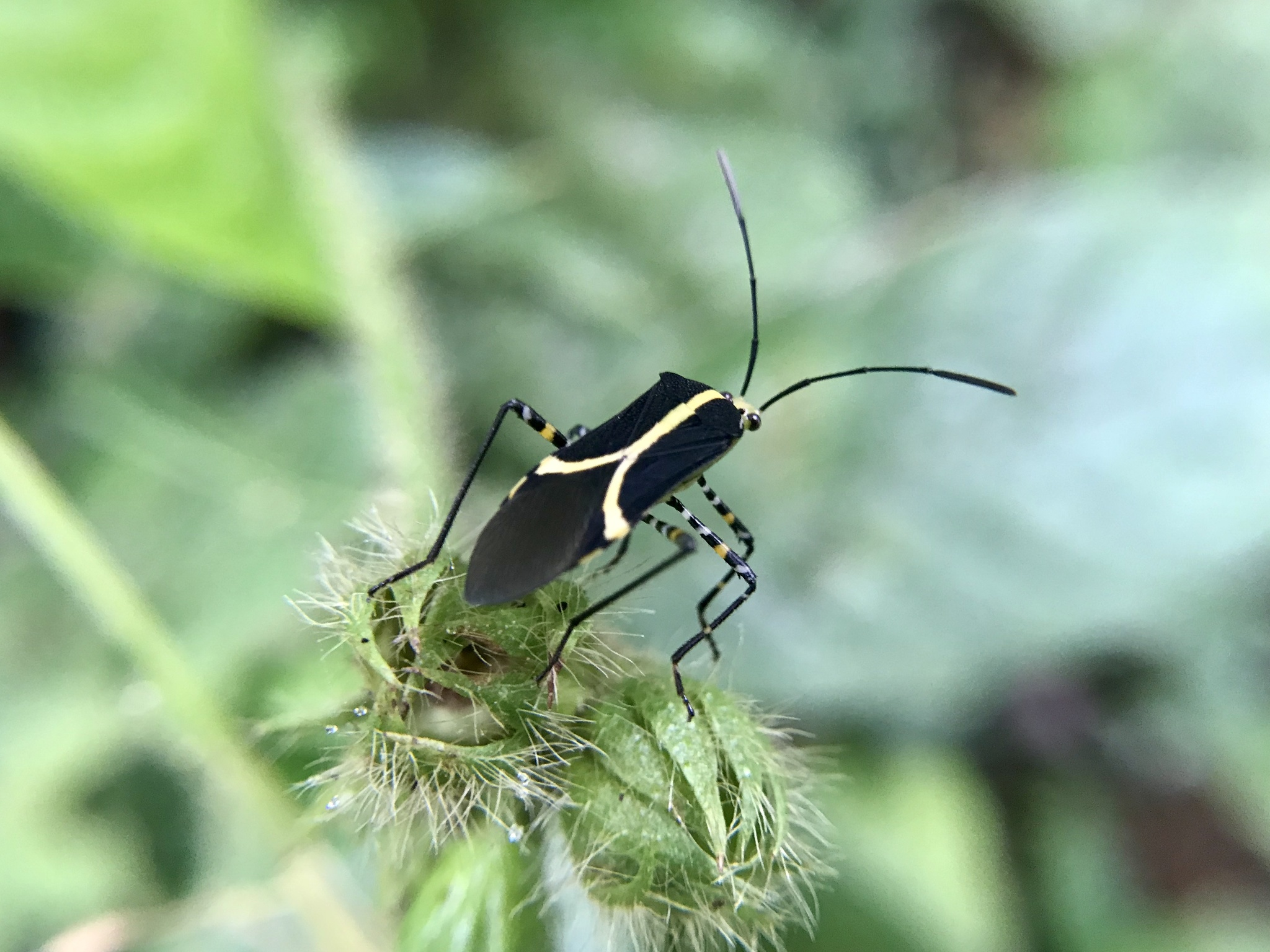

Scientific classification
- Domain: Eukaryota
- Kingdom: Animalia
- Phylum: Arthropoda
- Class: Insecta
- Order: Hemiptera
- Suborder: Heteroptera
- Family: Coreidae
- Genus: Hypselonotus
- Species: H. linea

Binomial name
- Hypselonotus linea Fabricius, 1803

= Hypselonotus linea =

Species of true bug

Hypselonotus linea is a species of leaf-footed bug in the family Coreidae. It is found in Costa Rica, Ecuador, Panama, and Nicaragua.
