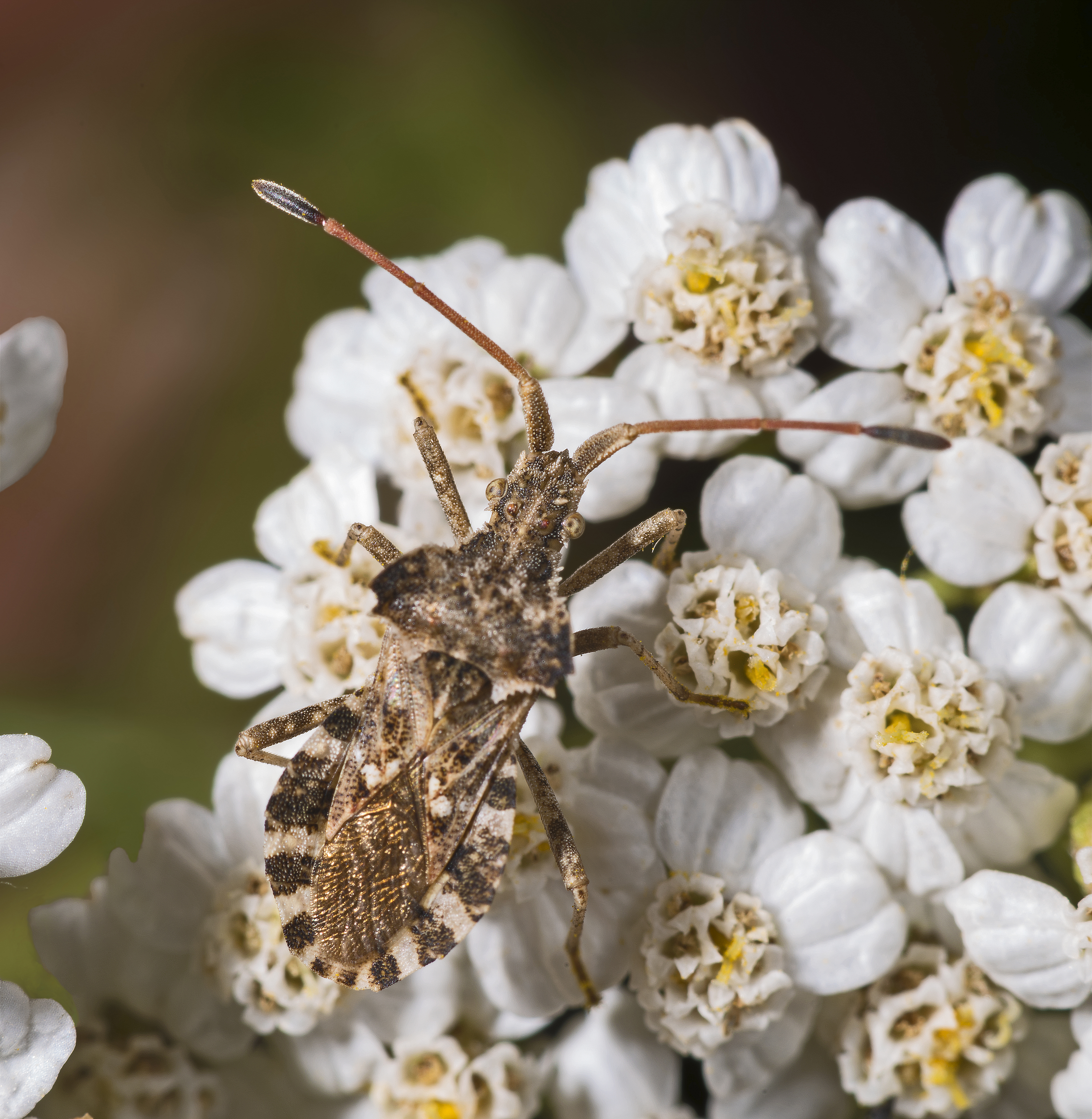

Scientific classification
- Kingdom: Animalia
- Phylum: Arthropoda
- Class: Insecta
- Order: Hemiptera
- Suborder: Heteroptera
- Family: Coreidae
- Genus: Centrocoris
- Species: C. variegatus

Binomial name
- Centrocoris variegatus Kolenati, 1845

= Centrocoris variegatus =

Species of true bug

Centrocoris variegatus is a species of true bug in the family Coreidae, subfamily Coreinae.

A distinctive character of Centrocoris variegatus in respect of Centrocoris spiniger are shorter antennae.

It is found in most of Europe.
