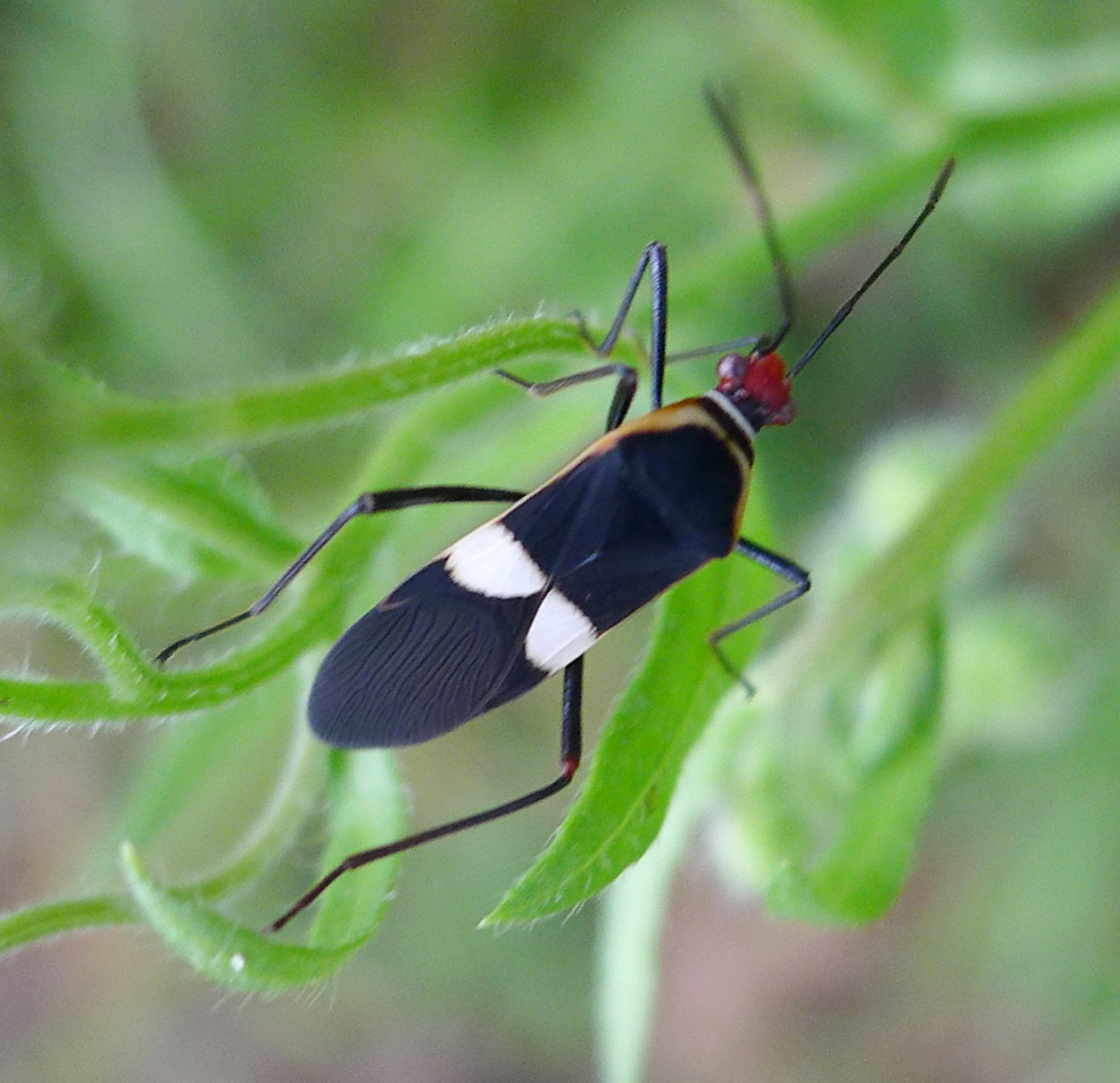

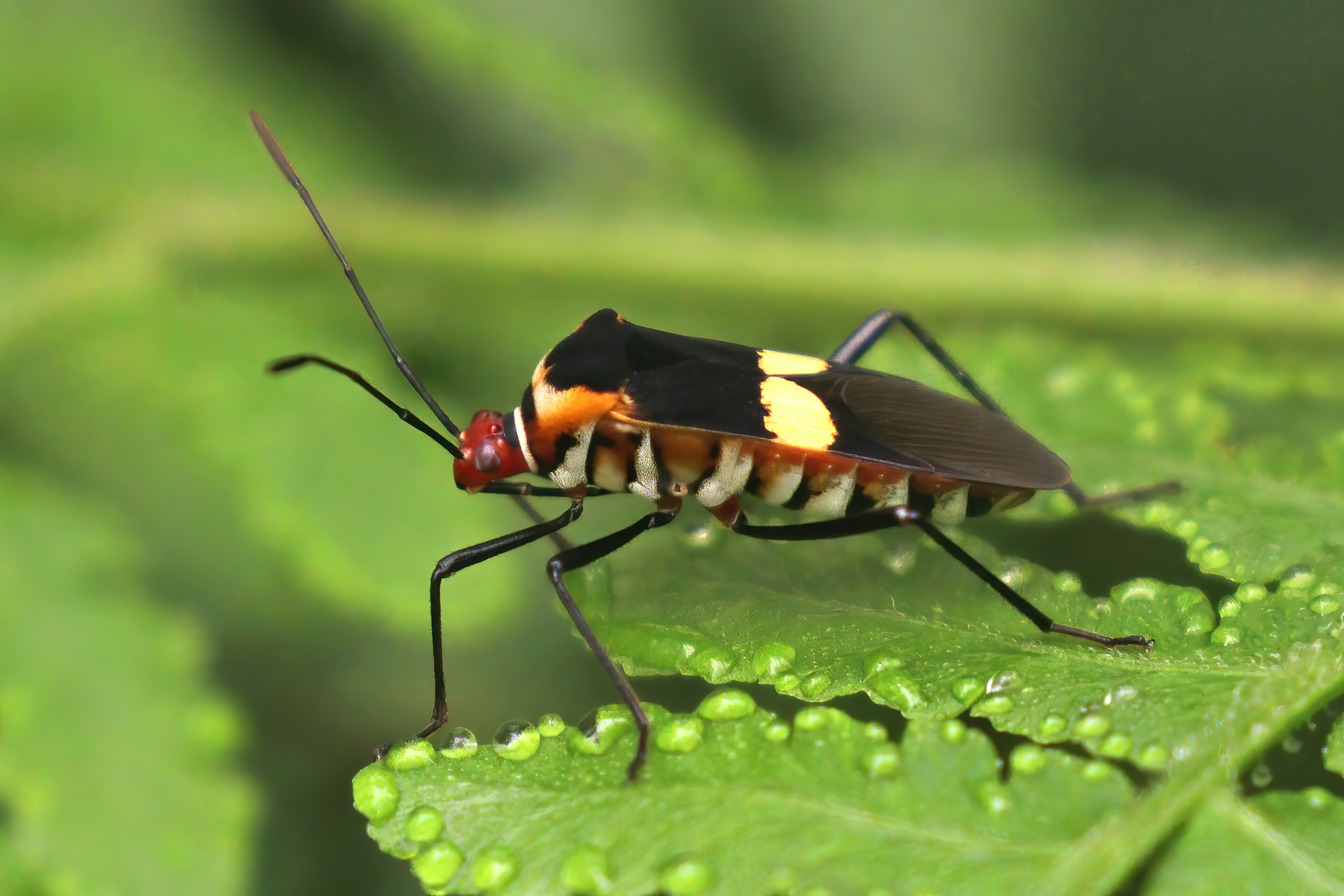
- both H. interruptus

Scientific classification
- Kingdom: Animalia
- Phylum: Arthropoda
- Clade: Pancrustacea
- Class: Insecta
- Order: Hemiptera
- Suborder: Heteroptera
- Family: Coreidae
- Subfamily: Coreinae
- Tribe: Coreini
- Genus: Hypselonotus; Hahn, 1833

= Hypselonotus =

Genus of true bugs

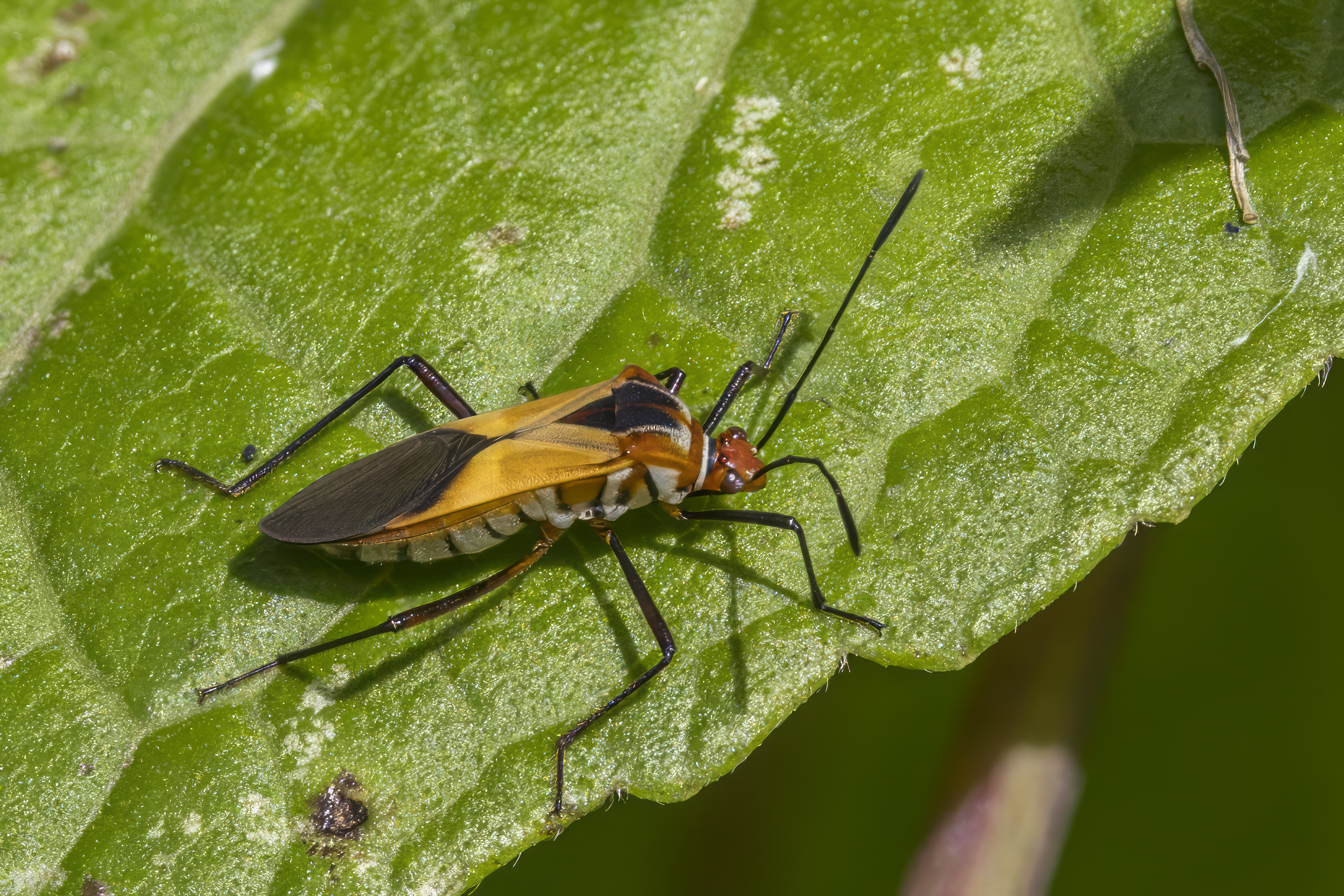
H. interruptus

Hypselonotus is a genus of leaf-footed bugs in the family Coreidae. There are about 12 described species in Hypselonotus.

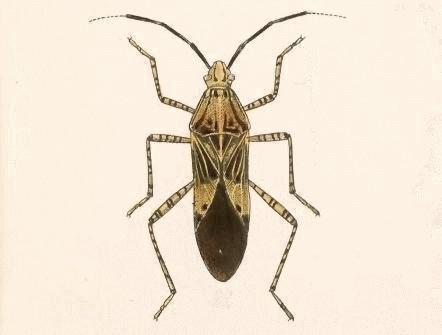
Hypselonotus punctiventris

== Species ==
These 12 species belong to the genus Hypselonotus:

- Hypselonotus aberrans Horváth, 1913
- Hypselonotus argutus Brailovsky, 1982
- Hypselonotus bitrianguliger Berg, 1892
- Hypselonotus fulvus (De Geer, 1773)
- Hypselonotus interruptus Hahn, 1833
- Hypselonotus linea (Fabricius, 1803)
- Hypselonotus lineatus Stål, 1862
- Hypselonotus orientalis Brailovsky, 1993
- Hypselonotus punctiventris Stål, 1862 (spot-sided coreid)
- Hypselonotus subterpunctatus Amyot & Serville, 1843
- Hypselonotus thoracicus Signoret, 1862
- Hypselonotus tricolor Breddin, 1901
