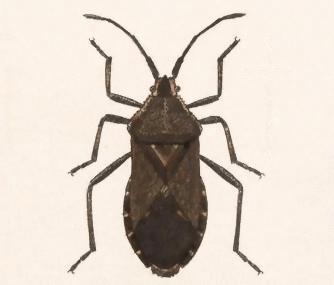
- Cimolus vitticeps

Scientific classification
- Kingdom: Animalia
- Phylum: Arthropoda
- Clade: Pancrustacea
- Class: Insecta
- Order: Hemiptera
- Suborder: Heteroptera
- Family: Coreidae
- Tribe: Coreini
- Genus: Cimolus; Stål, 1862

= Cimolus =

Genus of insects

Cimolus is a genus of leaf-footed bugs in the family Coreidae. There are at least four described species in Cimolus.

== Species ==
These four species belong to the genus Cimolus:

- Cimolus dilatatus (Dallas, 1852)
- Cimolus luteus Brailovsky, 2001
- Cimolus obscurus Stål, 1870
- Cimolus vitticeps Stål, 1862
