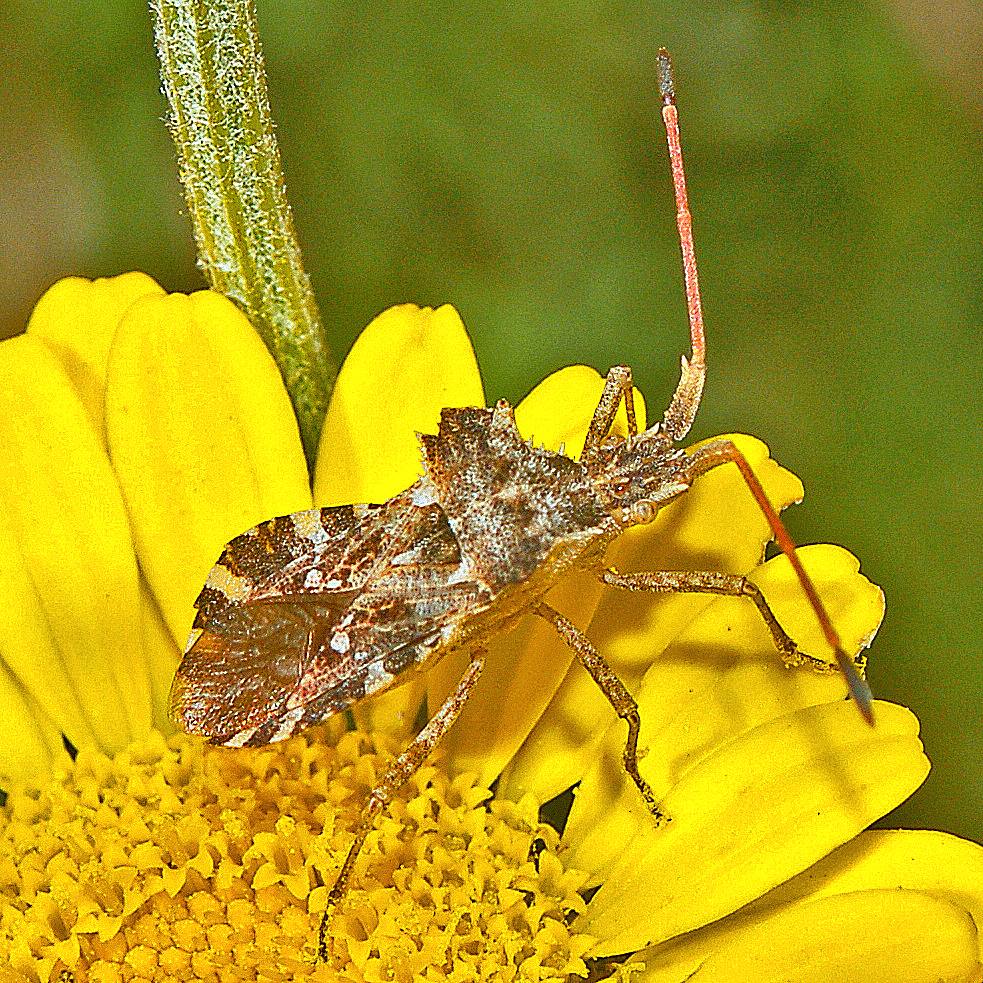
- Centrocoris spiniger, dorsal view

Scientific classification
- Kingdom: Animalia
- Phylum: Arthropoda
- Class: Insecta
- Order: Hemiptera
- Suborder: Heteroptera
- Family: Coreidae
- Genus: Centrocoris
- Species: C. spiniger

Binomial name
- Centrocoris spiniger (Fabricius, 1781)

= Centrocoris spiniger =

Species of true bug

Centrocoris spiniger is a species of true bug in the family Coreidae, subfamily Coreinae.

== Distribution ==
This species can be found in most of Europe. The distribution area of these bugs also covers the Middle East and Central Asia.

== Description ==
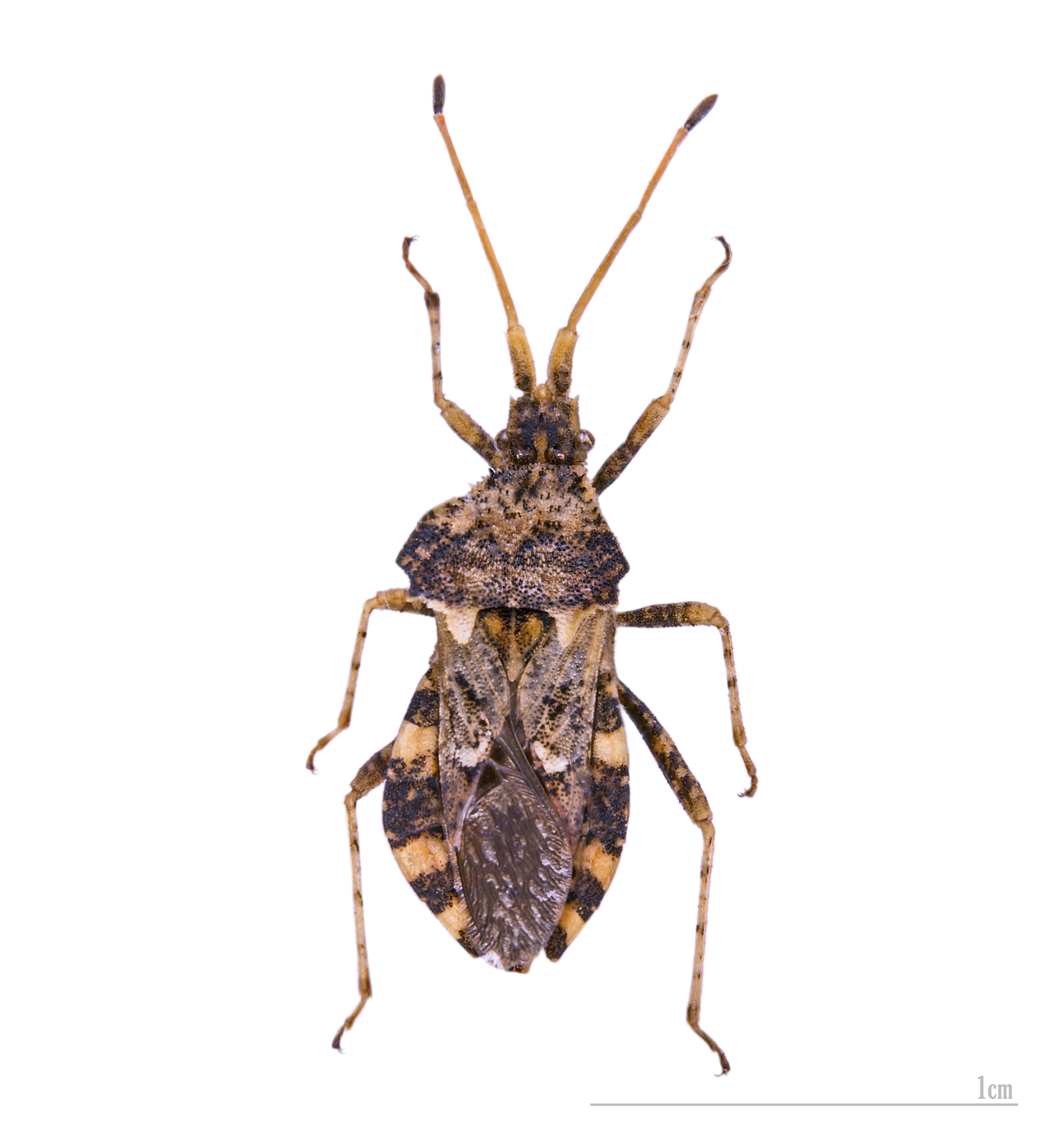
Mounted specimen

Centrocoris spiniger can reach a length of 6–10 millimetres (0.24–0.39 in).

These bugs are light brown colored. The rostrum extends to the posterior end of the body. The pronotum is slightly arched on the sides, with prominent teeth at the posterior margin.

This species is rather similar to Centrocoris variegatus. A distinctive character of Centrocoris spiniger in respect of Centrocoris variegatus are longer antennae.

== Biology ==
These bugs are often found on Asteraceae, especially thistles, as well as on grasses (Poaceae) and on (Chenopodiaceae).
