= Hendrik Coenraad Blöte =

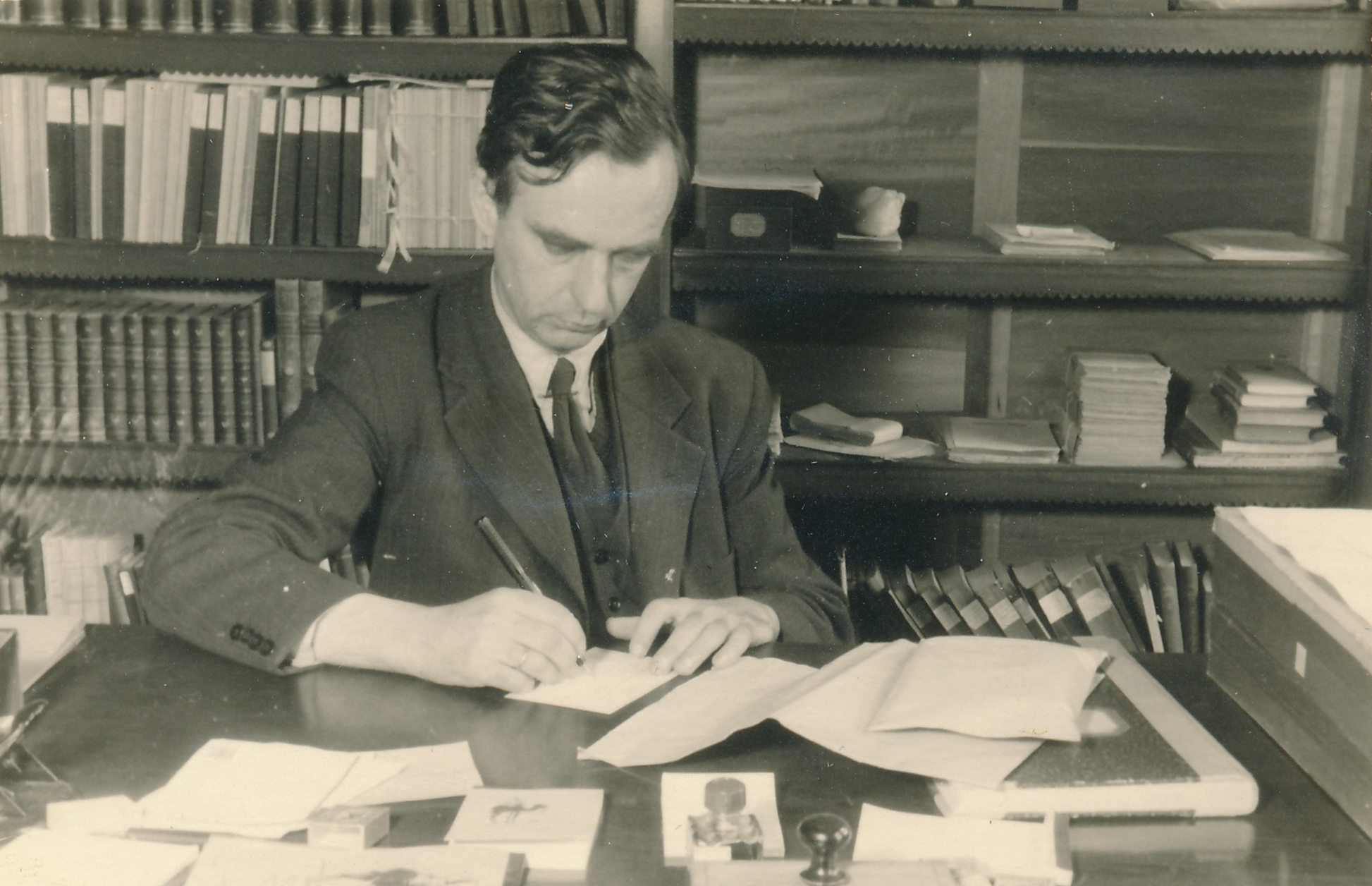
- Born: 12 February 1900; Leiden
- Died: 20 January 1990 (aged 89)
- Occupation: Entomologist
- Spouse: Maria Catharina Obbes
- Children: Rob Blöte, Jopie Blöte
- Parent(s): Catharina Brüggeman, Hendrik Willem Blöte

Hendrik Coenraad Blöte (12 February 1900 – 20 January 1990) was an entomologist, malacologist and crustaceologist. As an entomological authority he is cited as Blöte.

== Biography ==
=== Early years ===
Blöte was born in the Dutch city of Leiden, the son of Catharina Brüggeman and the physician Hendrik Willem Blöte. He obtained his degree from Leiden University in 1927.

=== Career ===
After graduating in October 1927, Blöte was appointed as a curator of Crustaceae and Mollusca in November the same year and was also responsible for part of the entomological collections, the Coleoptera and Hemiptera. In 1929 he was promoted to second curator in entomology and continued in a supervisory capacity until September 1929. He obtained his PhD in 1935 with a dissertation titled, "Remarks on Biogeography". Blöte continued to specialise in entomology, focusing on the Hemiptera collection.

=== Legacy ===
Blöte worked on multiple groups during his career and described more than 200 species new to science including many Coreoidea.

== Works ==
This is an incomplete list:

- Blöte H. C., 1933. New Pyrrhocoridae in the Collection of the British Museum (Natural History). Annals and Magazine of Natural History 10 11: 588-602
- Blöte H. C., 1934. Catalogue of the Coreidae in the Rijksmuseum van Natuurlijke Historie. Part I. Corizinae, Alydinae. Zoölogische Mededeelingen 17: 253-285
- Blöte H. C., 1935. Catalogue of the Coreidae in the Rijksmuseum van Natuurlijke Historie. Part II. Coreinae, First Part. Zoölogische Mededeelingen 18: 181-227
- Blöte H. C., 1936. Catalogue of the Coreidae in the Rijksmuseum van Natuurlijke Historie. Part III.Coreinae, Second Part. Zoölogische Mededeelingen 19: 23-66
- Blöte H. C., 1937. On African species of Leptocorixa Berthold. Temminckia 2: 281-296
- Blöte H. C., 1938. Catalogue of the Coreidae in the Rijksmuseum van natuurlijke Historie. Part IV. Coreinae, Third part. Zoölogische Mededeelingen 20(25): 275-308

== Gallery ==
Blöte at different stages of his career
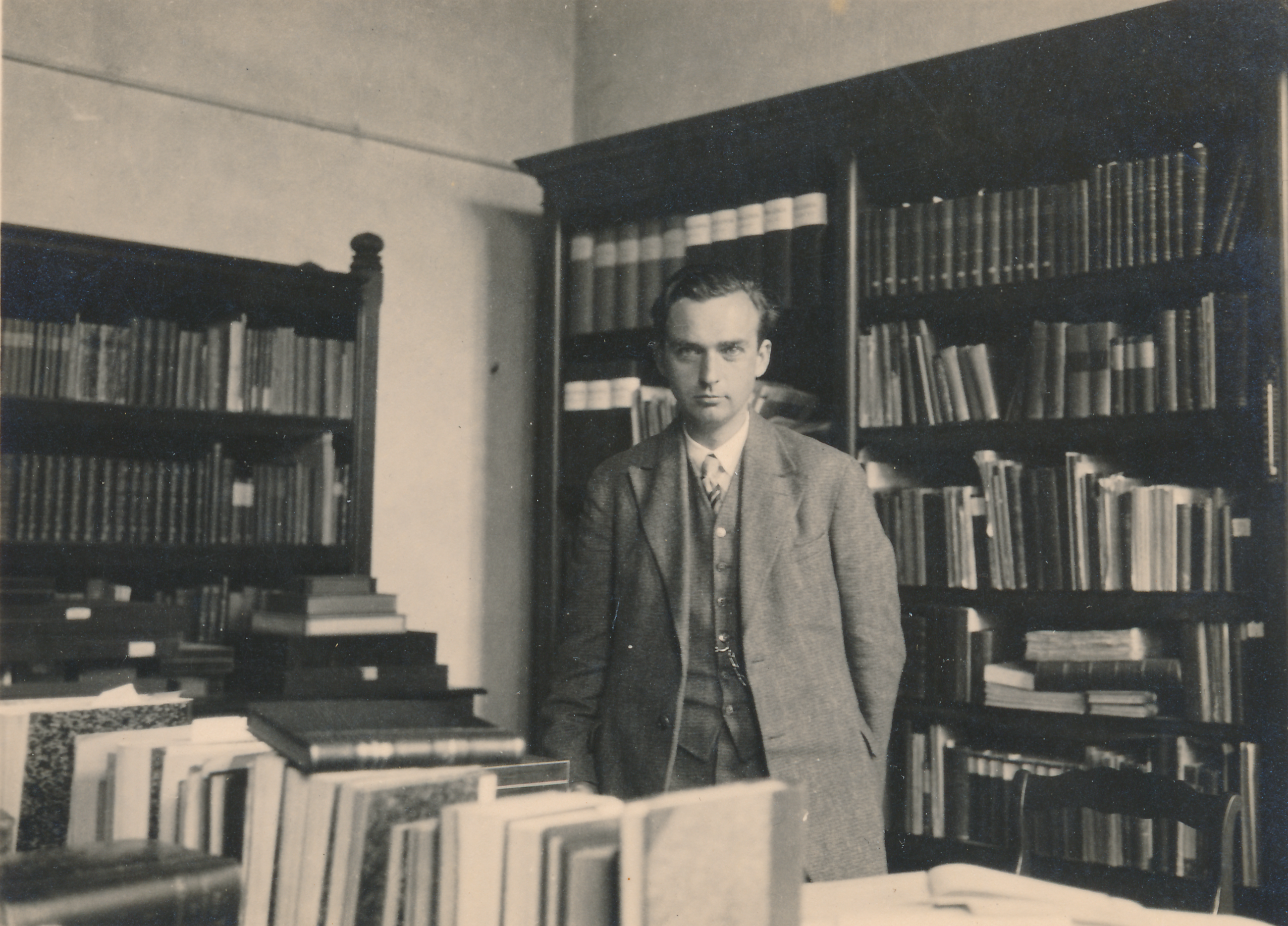
Young Blöte standing in an office surrounded by books.

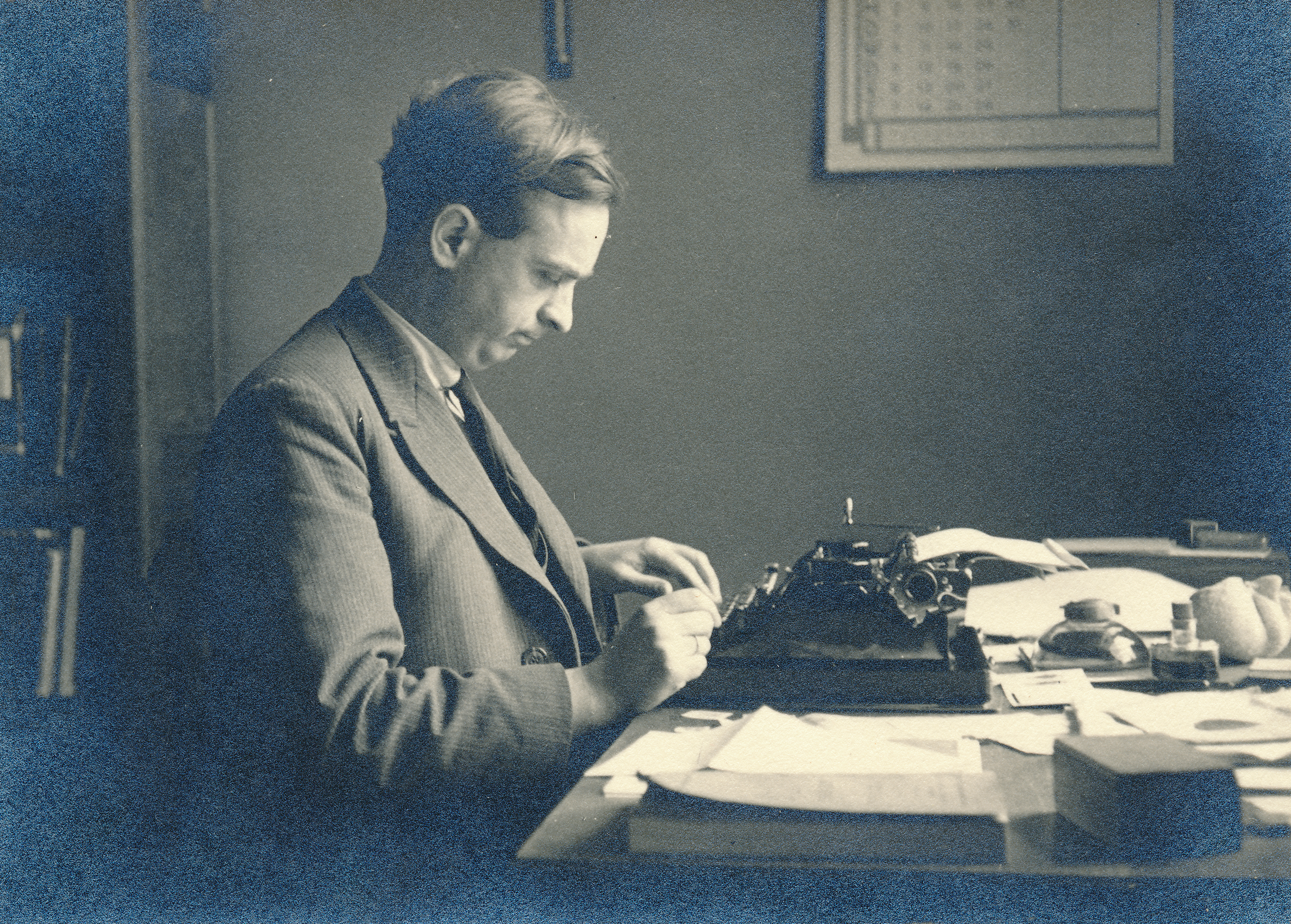
Middle-aged Blöte using a type writer.

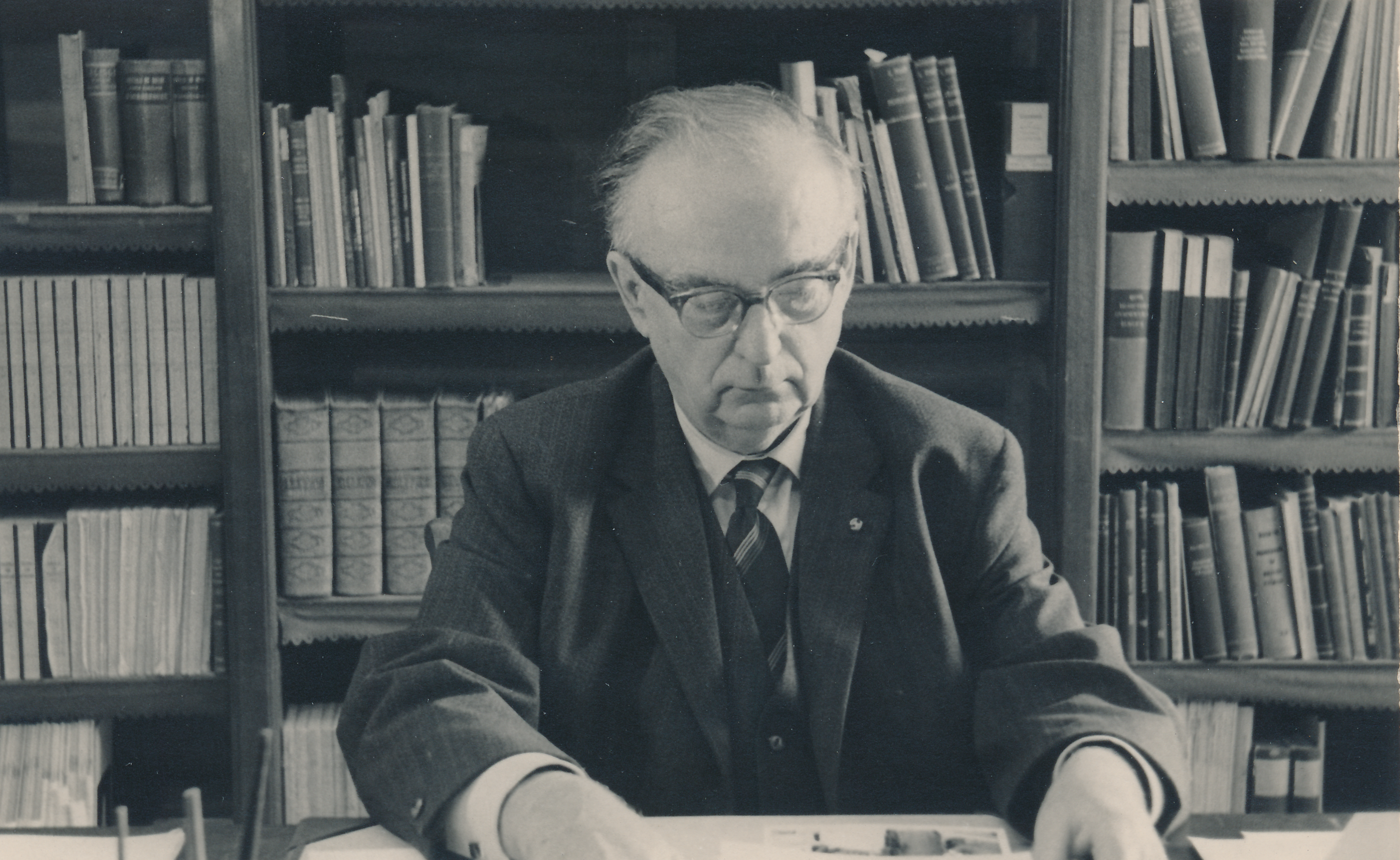
Older Blöte working at his desk.

=== Species described ===
- Acanthocoris acutus Blöte, 1935
- Acanthocoris declivicollis Blöte, 1935
- Acanthocoris elegans Blöte, 1935
- Acanthocoris erythraeensis Blöte, 1935
- Acanthocoris liberiensis Blöte, 1935
- Acanthocoris lineatus Blöte, 1935
- Acanthocoris major Blöte, 1935
- Acanthocoris mamillatus Blöte, 1935
- Acanthocoris rudis Blöte, 1935
- Acanthocoris speyeri Blöte, 1935
- Acanthotyla distinguenda Blöte, 1936
- Acanthotyla flexuosa (Blöte, 1936)
- Acidomeria brunnea (Blöte, 1935)
- Acidomeria dentipes (Blöte, 1935)
- Acidomeria tuberculicollis (Blöte, 1935)
- Amblypelta manihotis (Blöte, 1935)
- Anasa marginella Blöte, 1935
- Anasa sinuaticollis Blöte, 1935
- Aspilosterna elegantula (Blöte, 1938)
- Bloeteocoris inflexigena (Blöte, 1934)
- Brachylybas dimorpha Blöte, 1936
- Brachylybas inflexa Blöte, 1936
- Calyptohygia brevicollis (Blöte, 1933)
- Catorhintha bos Blöte, 1935
- Cebrenis cinnamomea Blöte, 1935
- Cletomorpha affinis Blöte, 1935
- Cletomorpha unifasciata Blöte, 1935
- Cletus angustus Blöte, 1935
- Cletus minutus Blöte, 1935
- Cletus similis Blöte, 1935
- Cloresmus boops Blöte, 1936
- Cloresmus jacobsoni Blöte, 1936
- Cosmoleptus sumatranus Blöte, 1934
- Cossutia validispina Blöte, 1938
- Daclera opaca Blöte, 1934
- Dalader distanti Blöte, 1938
- Dalmatomammurius cebrenoides (Blöte, 1935)
- Dasynus fumosus (Blöte, 1935)
- Dasynus kalshoveni Blöte, 1935
- Dasynus puncticeps Blöte, 1935
- Dasynus striatellus Blöte, 1935
- Elasmopoda elata Blöte, 1938
- Harmostes (Harmostes) Blöte, 1934
- Homalocolpura annulata Blöte, 1936
- Homalocolpura binotata Blöte, 1936
- Homalocolpura borneana Blöte, 1936
- Homalocolpura nitida Blöte, 1936
- Homalocolpura subopaca Blöte, 1936
- Homalocolpura vorax Blöte, 1936
- Homoeocerus (Anacanthocoris) adustus Blöte, 1936
- Homoeocerus (Anacanthocoris) nota Blöte, 1936
- Homoeocerus (Anacanthocoris) ochraceus Blöte, 1936
- Homoeocerus (Anacanthocoris) rufulus Blöte, 1936
- Homoeocerus (Anacanthocoris) tangens Blöte, 1936
- Homoeocerus (Tliponius) dallasi Blöte, 1936
- Homoeocerus (Tliponius) laterinotatus Blöte, 1936
- Homoeocerus (Tliponius) marginepunctatus Blöte, 1936
- Homoeocerus (Tliponius) pallescens Blöte, 1936
- Homoeocerus (Tliponius) pallidulus Blöte, 1936
- Homoeocerus (Tliponius) sumbawensis Blöte, 1936
- Hygia (Colpura) simalurensis Blöte, 1936
- Hygia (Hygia) pedestris Blöte, 1936
- Hygia (Microcolpura) flavitarsis Blöte, 1936
- Hygia (Pterocolpura) montana Blöte, 1936
- Hygia (Sphinctocolpura) forsteniana Blöte, 1936
- Hygia (Sphinctocolpura) minahassae Blöte, 1936
- Kennetus transversus Blöte, 1938
- Latimbus angulicollis Blöte, 1936
- Leptocoris minusculus Blöte, 1934
- Leptoglossus flavosignatus Blöte, 1936
- Leptoscelis flaviventris Blöte, 1936
- Mictis dilatipes (Blöte, 1938)
- Mictis tridentifer Blöte, 1938
- Molchina obtusidens Blöte, 1936
- Notobitus humeralis Blöte, 1936
- Oxypristis modestus Blöte, 1938
- Paradasynus acutispinus Blöte, 1935
- Physomerus flavicans Blöte, 1935
- Piezogaster herrichi (Blöte, 1938)
- Placophyllopus colthurnatus Blöte, 1938
- Prionolomia rudis Blöte, 1938
- Pternistria cerboides Blöte, 1938
- Pternistria waigeuensis Blöte, 1938
- Riptortus distinguendus Blöte, 1934
- Riptortus fuliginosus Blöte & Hagenbach, 1934
- Riptortus rubronotatus Blöte, 1934
- Salapia pretiosa Blöte, 1938
- Sciophyrella annulipes (Blöte, 1936)
- Sciophyroides flavoguttatus (Blöte, 1936)
- Sciophyropsis rugulosus (Blöte, 1936)
- Sphictyrtus similis Blöte, 1935
- Stenocoris (Erbula) elegans (Blöte, 1937)
- Stenocoris (Erbula) similis Blöte, 1937
- Stenocoris (Pseudoleptocorisa) erraticus (Blöte, 1937)
- Stenocoris (Stenocoris) maculosus (Blöte, 1937)
- Stenocoris (Stenocoris) pallidus (Blöte, 1937)
- Stenocoris (Stenocoris) sordidus (Blöte, 1937)
- Stenocoris (Stenocoris) v-nigrum (Blöte, 1937)
- Stictopleurus brevicornis Blöte, 1934
- Stictopleurus minutus Blöte, 1934
- Tachycolpura elongata (Blöte, 1936)
- Trematocoris acutangulus (Blöte, 1938)
- Trematocoris compactus (Blöte, 1938)
- Tuberculiformia subinermis (Blöte, 1934)
- Typhlocolpura vandervechti (Blöte, 1932)
- Vazquezitocoris inflexicollis (Blöte, 1935)
- Vittorius sumatranus Blöte, 1936
- Zicca impicta Blöte, 1935
- Zygometapodus castaneus (Blöte, 1938)
