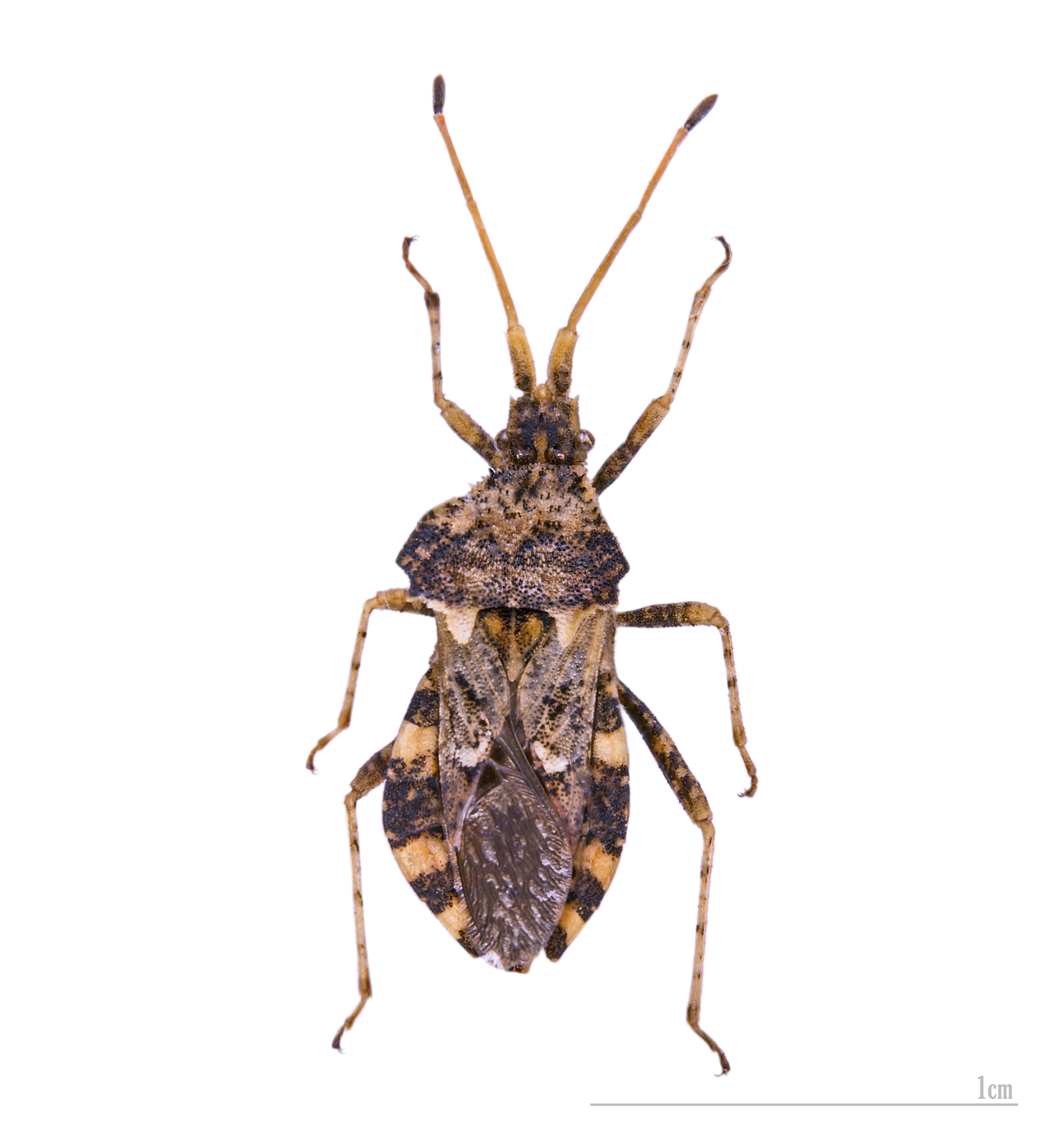
- Centrocoris spiniger, Maourine pond, Toulouse, France

Scientific classification
- Domain: Eukaryota
- Kingdom: Animalia
- Phylum: Arthropoda
- Class: Insecta
- Order: Hemiptera
- Suborder: Heteroptera
- Superfamily: Coreoidea
- Family: Coreidae
- Subfamily: Coreinae
- Tribe: Coreini; Leach, 1815

= Coreini =

Tribe of true bugs

Coreini is a tribe of leaf-footed bugs in the family Coreidae. There are at least 20 genera and 70 described species in Coreini.

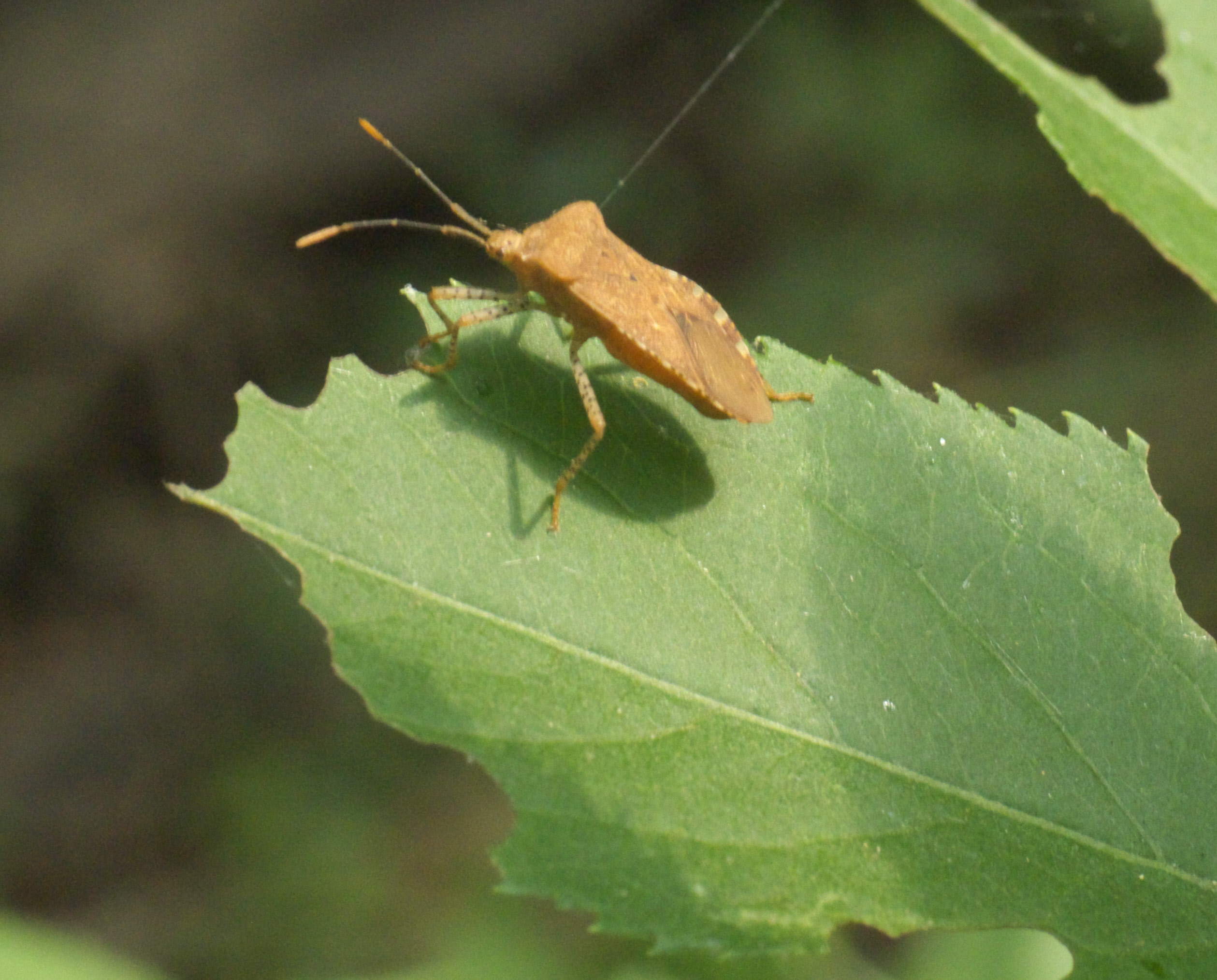
Anasa

== Genera ==
These 25 genera belong to the tribe Coreini:

- Althos Kirkaldy, 1904^{i c g b}
- Anasa Amyot & Serville, 1843^{i c g b} (squash bugs)
- Catorhintha Stål, 1859^{i c g b}
- Centrocoris Kolenati, 1845^{i c g b}
- Centroplax Horváth, 1932^{i c g}
- Cercinthinus Kiritshenko, 1916^{i c g}
- Cercinthus Stål, 1860^{i c g}
- Cimolus Stål, 1862^{i c g b}
- Coreus Fabricius, 1794^{i c g}
- Enoplops Amyot and Serville, 1843^{i c g}
- Eretmophora Stein, 1860^{i c g}
- Haidara Distant, 1908^{i c g}
- Haploprocta Stål, 1872^{i c g}
- Hypselonotus Hahn, 1833^{i c g b}
- Madura Stål, 1860^{i c g b}
- Namacus Amyot & Serville, 1843^{i c g b}
- Nisoscolopocerus Barber, 1928^{i c g b}
- Oannes Distant, 1911^{i c g}
- Scolopocerus Uhler, 1875^{i c g b}
- Sethenira Spinola, 1837^{i c g b}
- Spathocera Stein, 1860^{i c g}
- Syromastus Berthold in Latreille, 1827^{i c g}
- Vazquezitocoris Brailovsky, 1990^{i c g b}
- Villasitocoris Brailovsky, 1990^{i c g b}
- Zicca Amyot & Serville, 1843^{i c g b}

Data sources: i = ITIS, c = Catalogue of Life, g = GBIF, b = Bugguide.net
