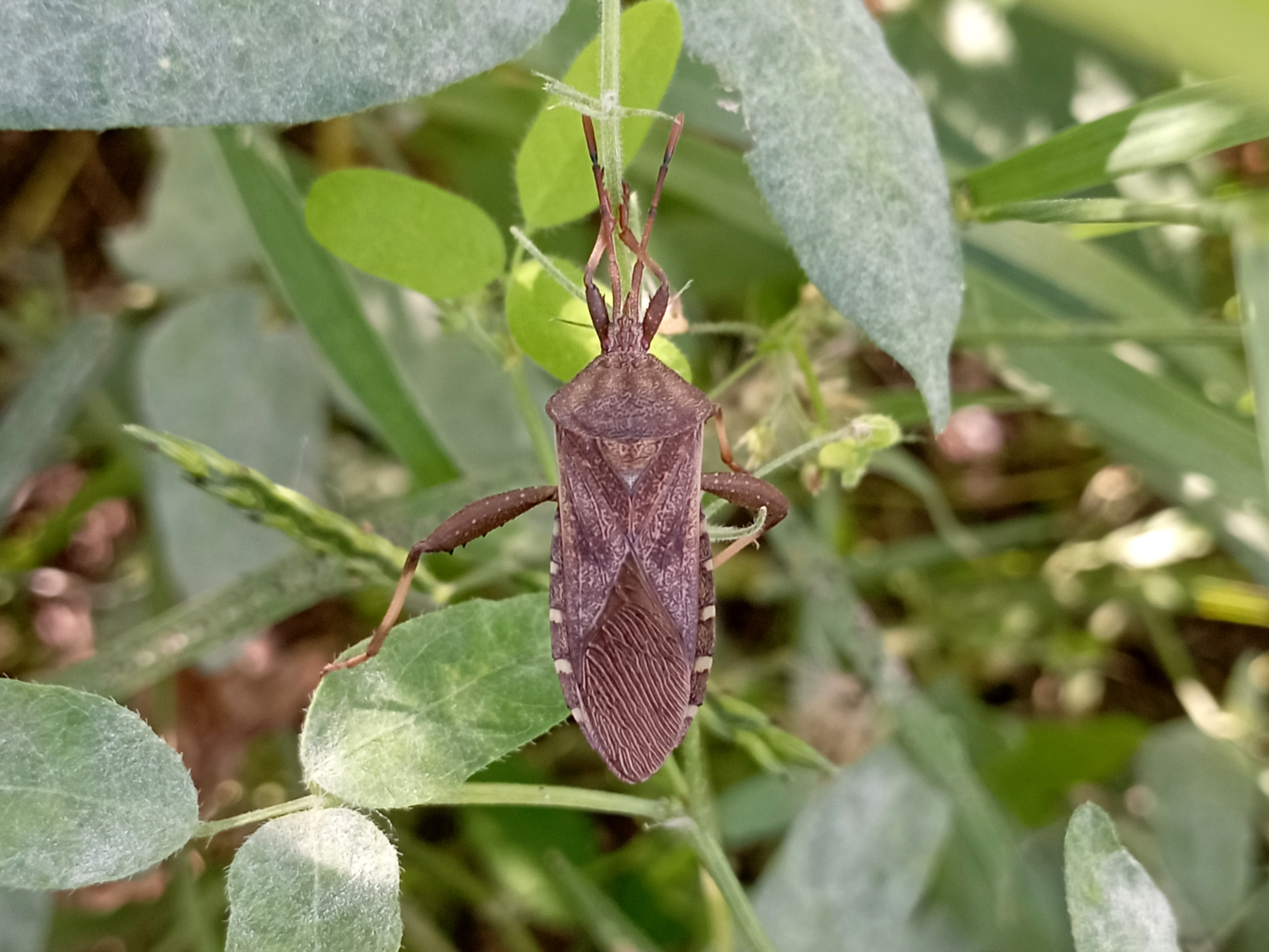

Scientific classification
- Kingdom: Animalia
- Phylum: Arthropoda
- Class: Insecta
- Order: Hemiptera
- Suborder: Heteroptera
- Family: Coreidae
- Subfamily: Coreinae
- Genus: Piezogaster
- Species: P. indecorus

Binomial name
- Piezogaster indecorus (Walker, 1871)

= Piezogaster indecorus =

Species of true bug

Piezogaster indecorus is a species of leaf-footed bug in the family Coreidae. It is found in Central America and North America.
