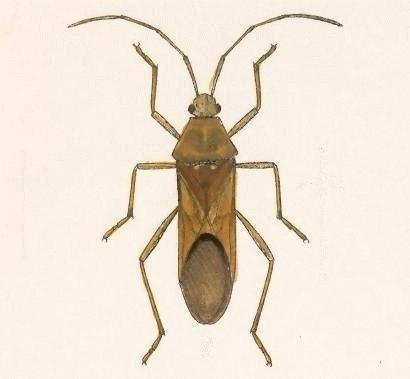

Scientific classification
- Kingdom: Animalia
- Phylum: Arthropoda
- Clade: Pancrustacea
- Class: Insecta
- Order: Hemiptera
- Suborder: Heteroptera
- Family: Coreidae
- Tribe: Discogastrini
- Genus: Savius
- Species: S. jurgiosus

Binomial name
- Savius jurgiosus (Stål, 1862)

= Savius jurgiosus =

Species of true bug

Savius jurgiosus is a species of leaf-footed bug in the family Coreidae. It is found in Central America and North America.

== Subspecies ==
These two subspecies belong to the species Savius jurgiosus:

- Savius jurgiosus jurgiosus (Stål, 1862)
- Savius jurgiosus nigroclavatus Brailovsky, 1986
