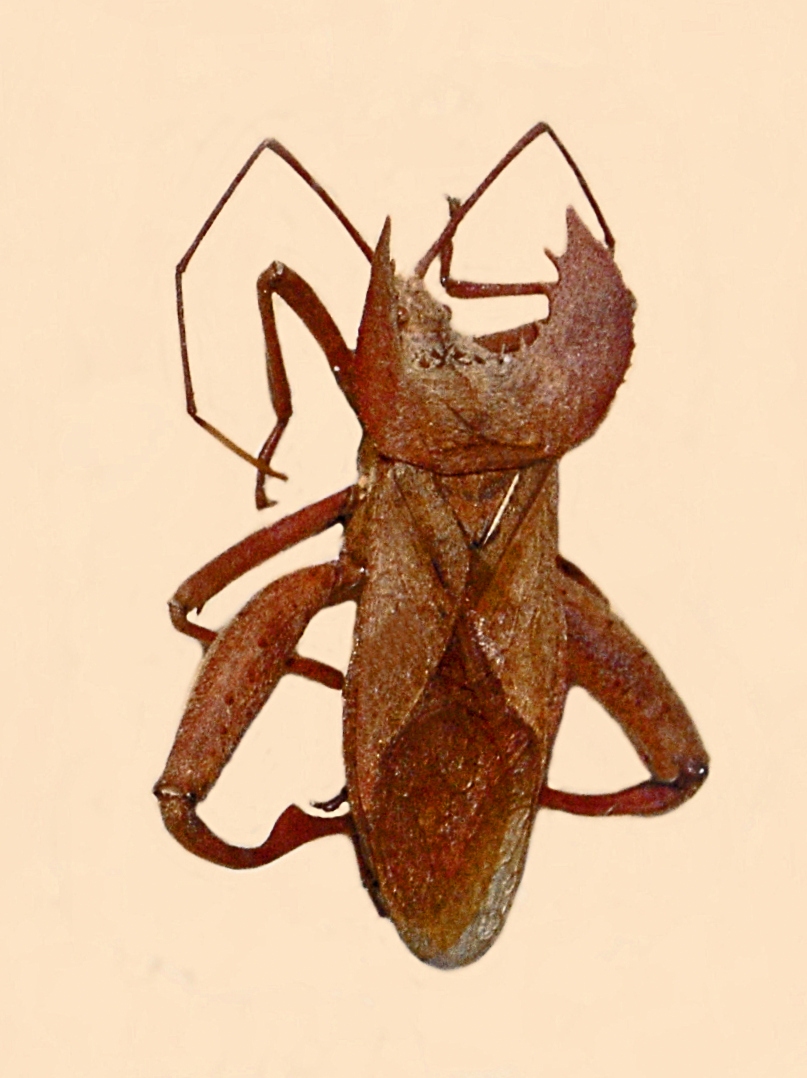
- Molipteryx hardwickii

Scientific classification
- Domain: Eukaryota
- Kingdom: Animalia
- Phylum: Arthropoda
- Class: Insecta
- Order: Hemiptera
- Suborder: Heteroptera
- Family: Coreidae
- Subfamily: Coreinae
- Genus: Molipteryx; Kiritshenko, 1916

= Molipteryx =

Genus of true bugs

Molipteryx is a genus of the squash bugs belonging to the family Coreidae.

== Species ==
- Molipteryx asahinai Kikuhara, 2006
- Molipteryx chinai (Miller, N. C. E., 1931)
- Molipteryx fuliginosa (Uhler, 1860)
- Molipteryx hardwickii (White, 1839)
- Molipteryx lunata (Distant, 1900)
