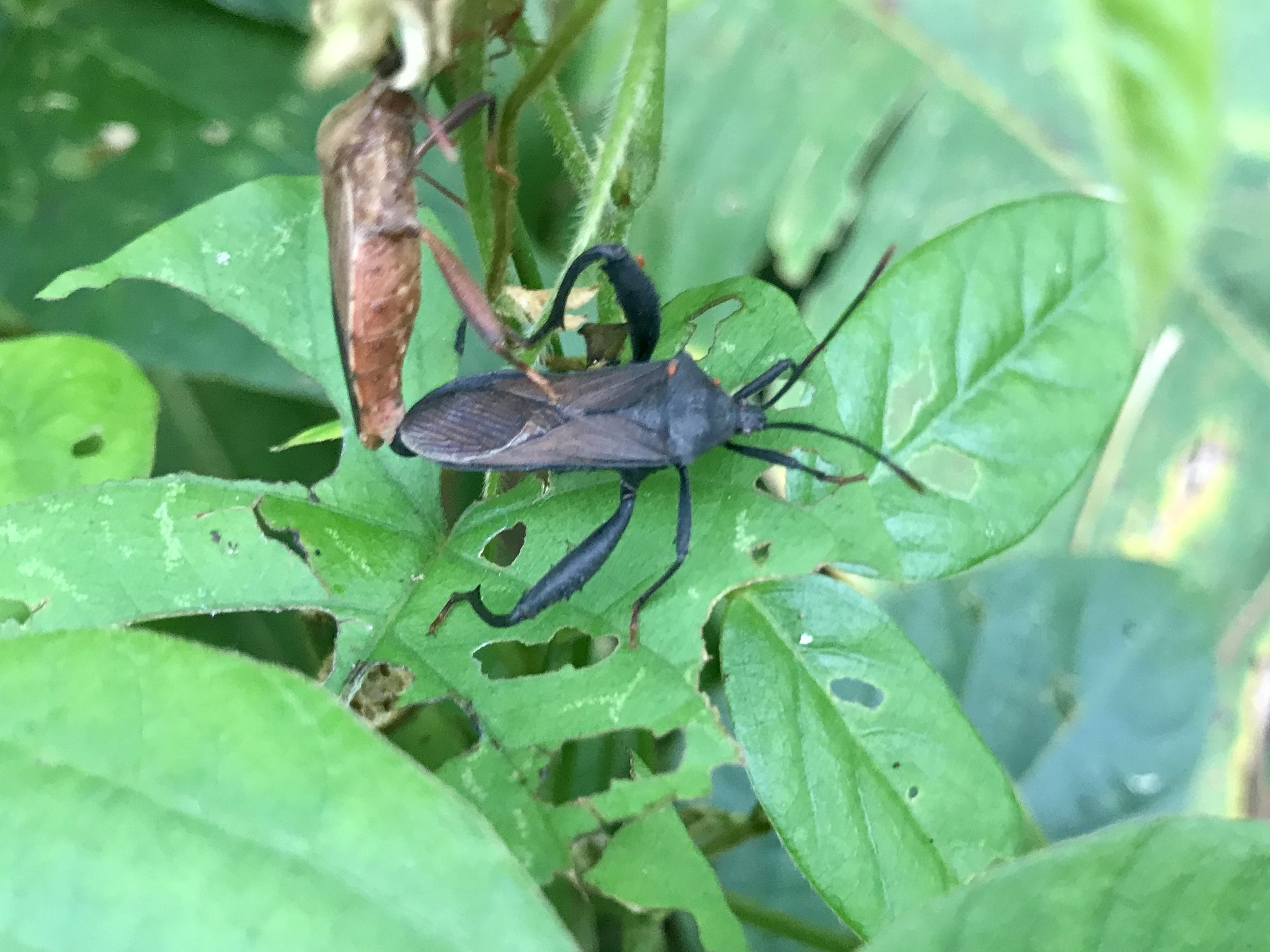

Scientific classification
- Kingdom: Animalia
- Phylum: Arthropoda
- Clade: Pancrustacea
- Class: Insecta
- Order: Hemiptera
- Suborder: Heteroptera
- Family: Coreidae
- Subfamily: Coreinae
- Genus: Piezogaster
- Species: P. odiosus

Binomial name
- Piezogaster odiosus (Stål, 1862)

= Piezogaster odiosus =

Species of true bug

Piezogaster odiosus is a species of leaf-footed bug in the family Coreidae. It is found in Central America and North America.
