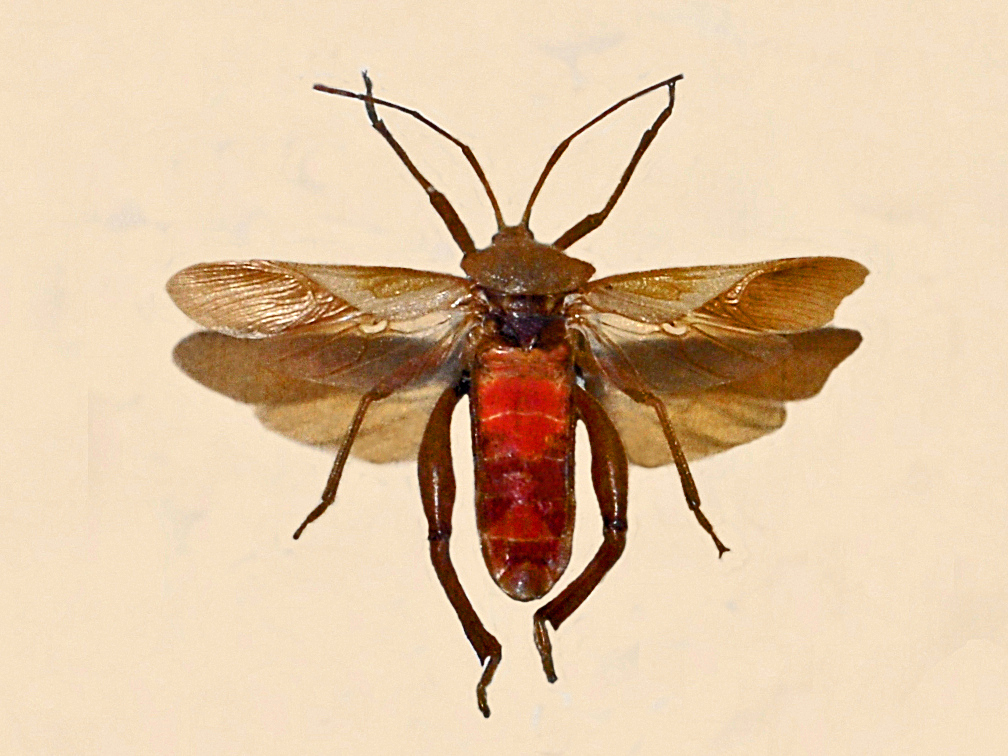
- Plectropoda cruciata

Scientific classification
- Kingdom: Animalia
- Phylum: Arthropoda
- Class: Insecta
- Order: Hemiptera
- Suborder: Heteroptera
- Family: Coreidae
- Subfamily: Coreinae
- Genus: Plectropoda; Bergroth, 1894

= Plectropoda =

Genus of true bugs

Plectropoda is a genus of squash bugs belonging to the family Coreidae.

== Species ==
- Plectropoda affinis (Distant, 1900)
- Plectropoda basilewskyi Schouteden, 1957
- Plectropoda bicolor (Haglund, 1895)
- Plectropoda bubi Villiers, 1955
- Plectropoda cruciata (Dallas, 1852)
- Plectropoda dekeyseri (Villiers, 1950)
- Plectropoda ghesquierei Schouteden, 1938
- Plectropoda gnathenion Linnavuori, 1973
- Plectropoda granulata (Stål, 1866)
- Plectropoda hottentota (Palisot de Beauvois, 1805)
- Plectropoda lividipes (Fairmaire, 1858)
- Plectropoda lobata (Haglund, 1895)
- Plectropoda mesophila O'Shea, 1980
- Plectropoda oblongipes (Fabricius, 1803)
- Plectropoda rothi (Dallas, 1852)
- Plectropoda spinosula (Signoret, 1858)
- Plectropoda sublobata Schouteden, 1938
- Plectropoda superba Schouteden, 1938
- Plectropoda suspecta Schouteden, 1938
- Plectropoda terminalis (Dallas, 1852)
- Plectropoda undata (Dallas, 1852)
- Plectropoda vrijdaghi Schouteden, 1938
