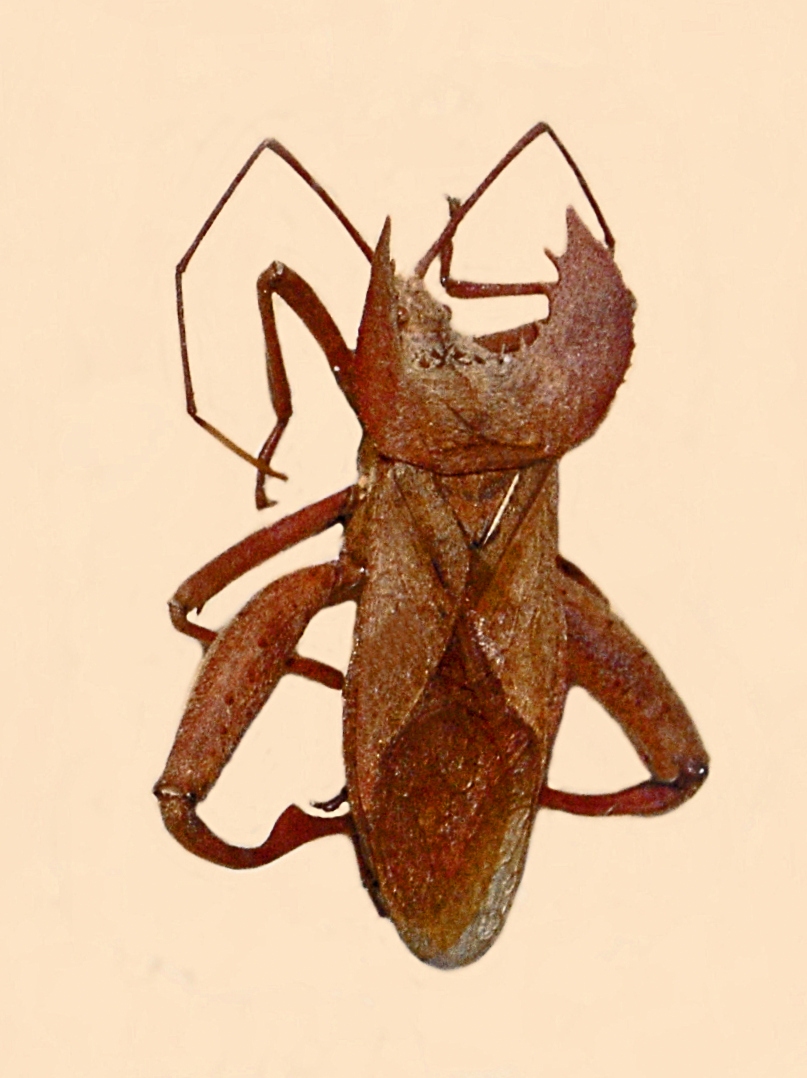
- Molipteryx hardwickii

Scientific classification
- Domain: Eukaryota
- Kingdom: Animalia
- Phylum: Arthropoda
- Class: Insecta
- Order: Hemiptera
- Suborder: Heteroptera
- Family: Coreidae
- Genus: Molipteryx
- Species: M. hardwickii

Binomial name
- Molipteryx hardwickii (White, 1839)

Synonyms
- Derepteryx hardwickii White, 1839

= Molipteryx hardwickii =

Species of true bug

Molipteryx hardwickii is a species of squash bugs belonging to the subfamily Coreinae.

== Distribution ==
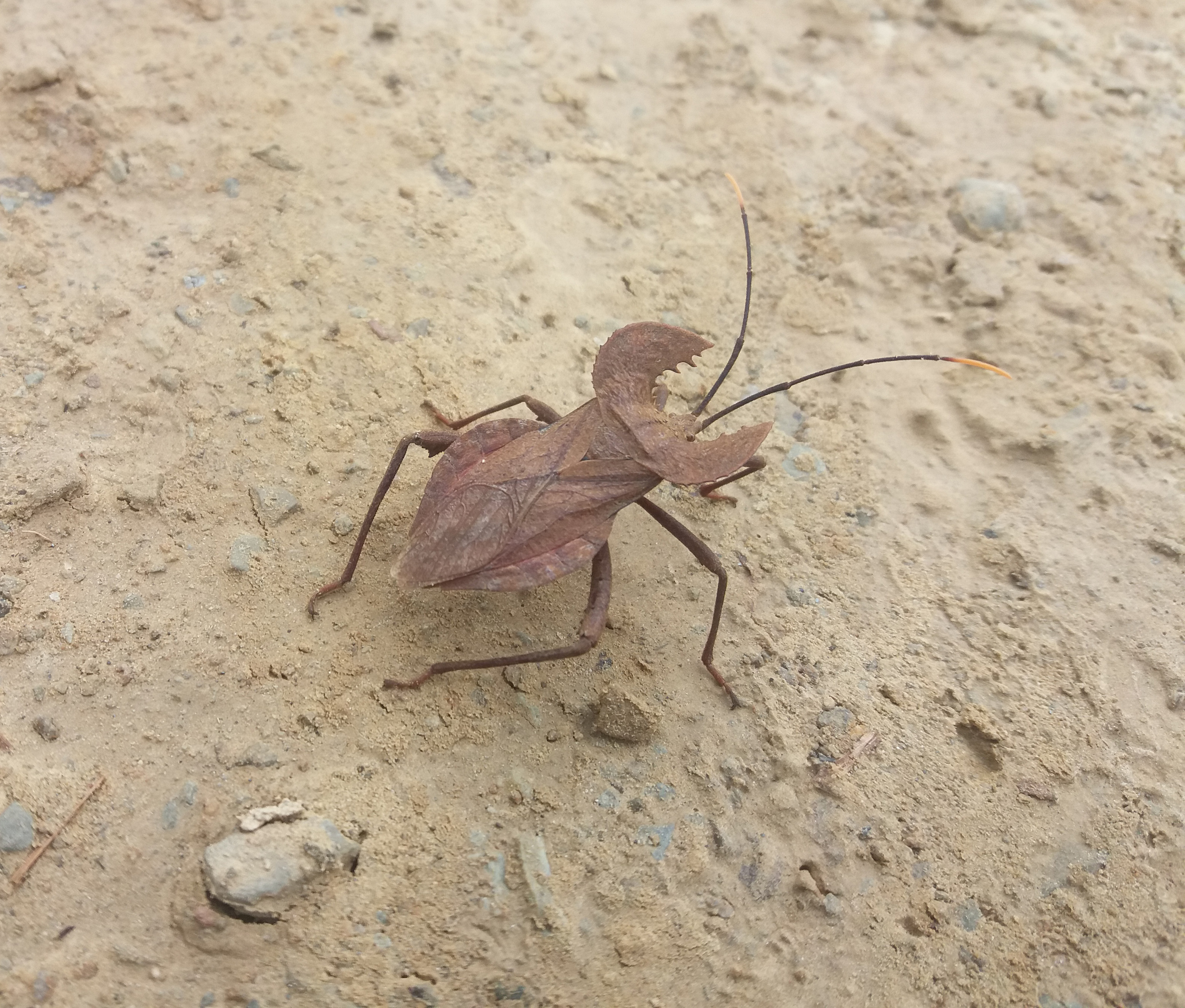

This species is present in India and Nepal.
