= Mamurius =

Scientific classification
- Kingdom: Animalia
- Phylum: Arthropoda
- Clade: Pancrustacea
- Class: Insecta
- Order: Hemiptera
- Suborder: Heteroptera
- Family: Coreidae
- Subfamily: Coreinae
- Genus: Mamurius; Stål, 1862

Genus of true bugs

Mamurius is a genus of leaf-footed bugs in the family Coreidae. There are at least two described species in Mamurius.

== Species ==
These two species belong to the genus Mamurius:

- Mamurius cubanus Barber & Bruner, 1947
- Mamurius mopsus Stål, 1862
