= Daalder =

Daalder may refer to:

- Dutch rijksdaalder (Empire dollar), worth 48 to 50 stuivers (Dutch shillings)
- Leeuwendaalder (Lion dollar), worth 36 to 42 stuivers
- For the plain daalder (Dutch dollar), worth 30 stuivers i.e. 1½ guilder (or florin), see under rijksdaalder above.

== People with the surname ==
- Ivo Daalder (born 1960), Dutch-American political scientist and government official
- Rene Daalder (1944–2019), Dutch writer and director

== See also ==
- Dalader, a genus of coreid bugs
