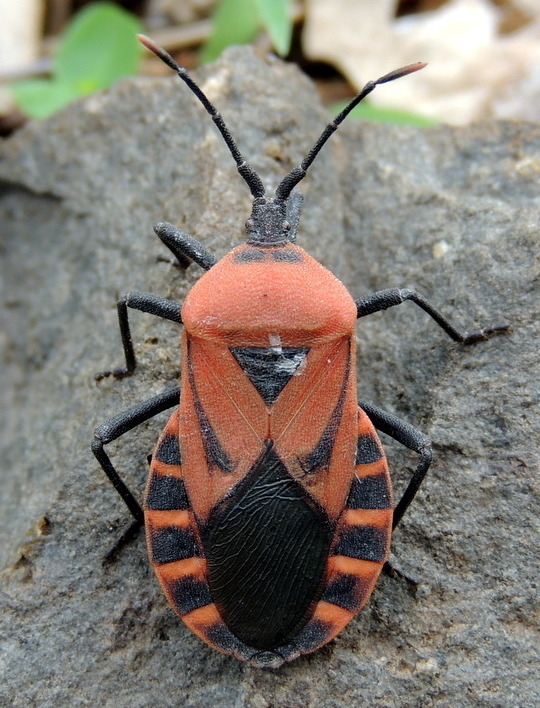
- Brachytes bicolor

Scientific classification
- Kingdom: Animalia
- Phylum: Arthropoda
- Class: Insecta
- Order: Hemiptera
- Suborder: Heteroptera
- Family: Coreidae
- Subfamily: Coreinae
- Tribe: Daladerini
- Genus: Brachytes; Westwood, 1842

= Brachytes =

Genus of insects

Brachytes is a genus of seed bugs in the tribe Daladerini, erected by John Obadiah Westwood in 1842.
