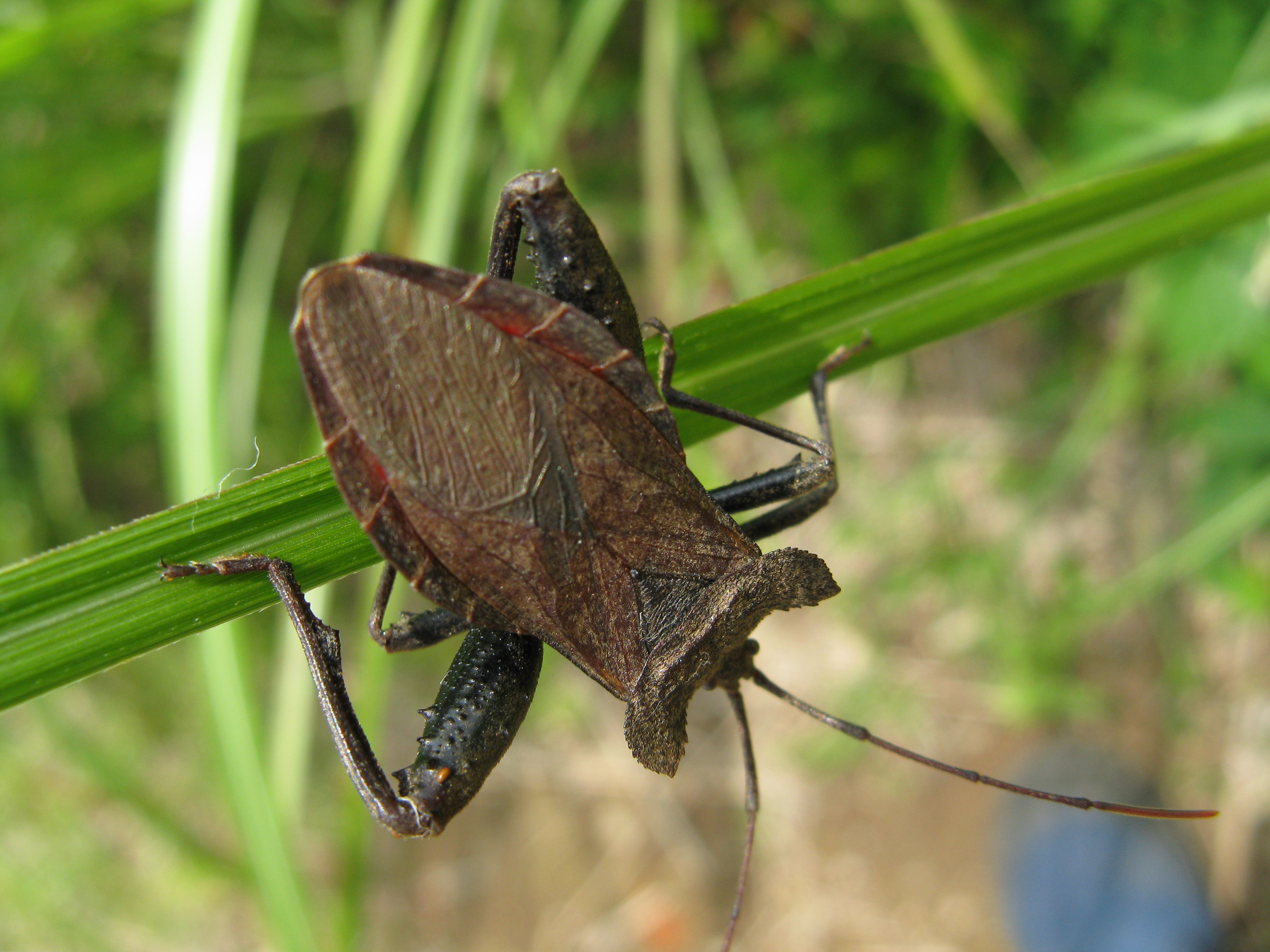

Scientific classification
- Kingdom: Animalia
- Phylum: Arthropoda
- Class: Insecta
- Order: Hemiptera
- Suborder: Heteroptera
- Family: Coreidae
- Genus: Molipteryx
- Species: M. fuliginosa

Binomial name
- Molipteryx fuliginosa (Uhler, 1860)

= Molipteryx fuliginosa =

Species of true bug

Molipteryx fuliginosa is a species of squash bugs belonging to the subfamily Coreinae.

== Distribution ==
This species is present in Japan and Southeastern Russia.

== Reproduction ==
After overwintering, female adults copulate multiple times from May thru August, laying between 21 and 36 eggs over multiple oviposition events. Eggs are laid both on host plants in the families Rosaceae and Asteraceae (on which nymphs can feed) and on other substrates, such as the ground. Eggs develop into adults over a timespan of 80 to 117 days depending on air temperature, passing through five instars.

== Agricultural impact ==
In Southeast Russia, M. fuliginosa can damage red raspberry crops through feeding on the sap and fruit of these plants.
