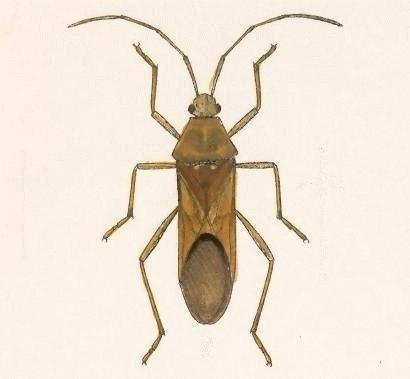
- Savius jurgiosus

Scientific classification
- Domain: Eukaryota
- Kingdom: Animalia
- Phylum: Arthropoda
- Class: Insecta
- Order: Hemiptera
- Suborder: Heteroptera
- Family: Coreidae
- Subfamily: Coreinae
- Tribe: Discogastrini
- Genus: Savius; Stål, 1862

= Savius =

Genus of true bugs

Savius is a genus of leaf-footed bugs in the family Coreidae. There are about nine described species in Savius.

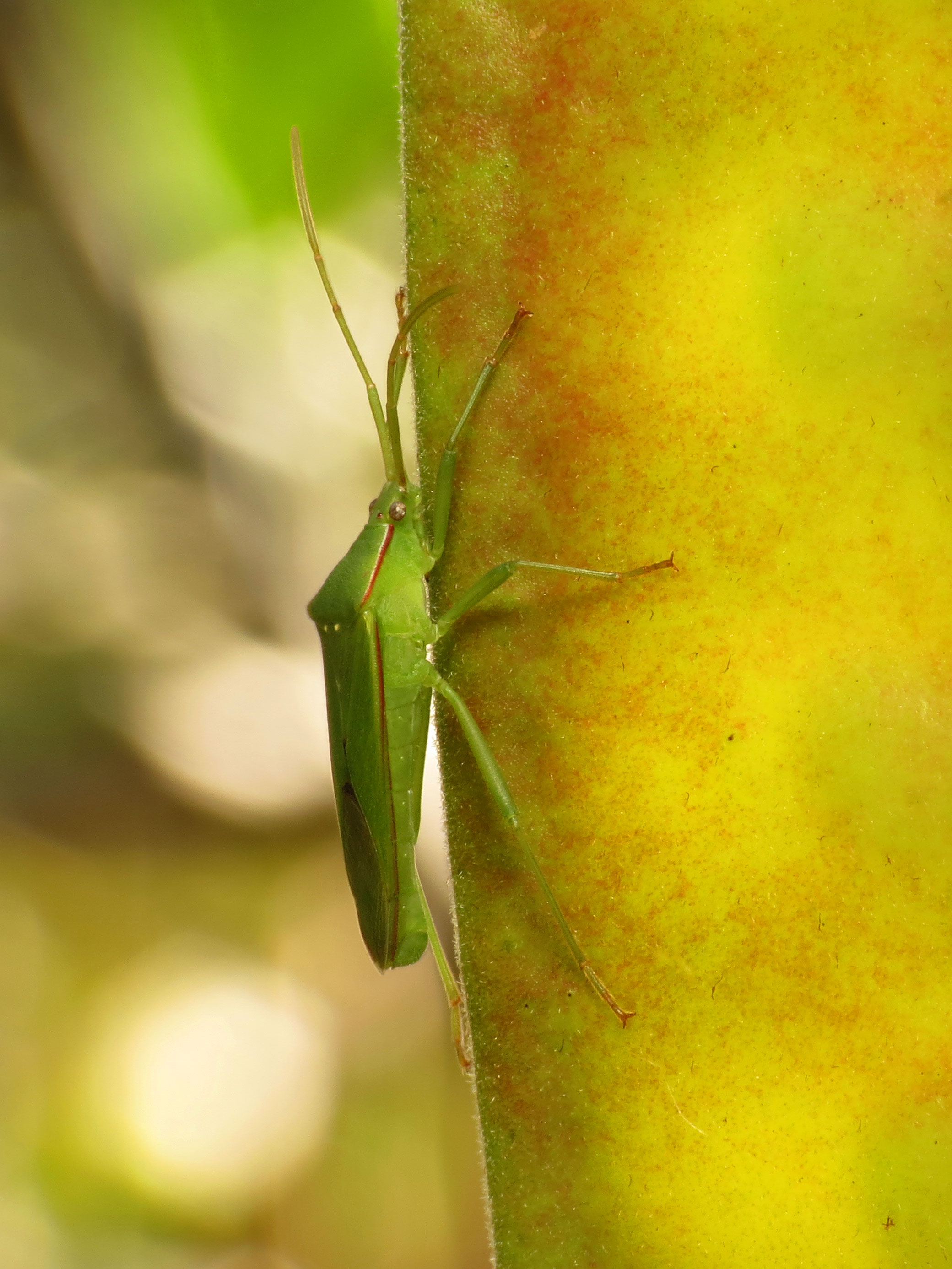
Savius rufomarginatus

== Species ==
These nine species belong to the genus Savius:

- Savius bergi Bergroth, 1905
- Savius buenoi Brailovsky, 1986
- Savius carayoni Brailovsky, 1986
- Savius diagonalis Berg, 1892
- Savius dilectus (Stål, 1862)
- Savius diversicornis (Westwood, 1842)
- Savius jurgiosus (Stål, 1862)
- Savius rufomarginatus Brailovsky, 1986
- Savius terrabus Brailovsky & Barrera, 2003
