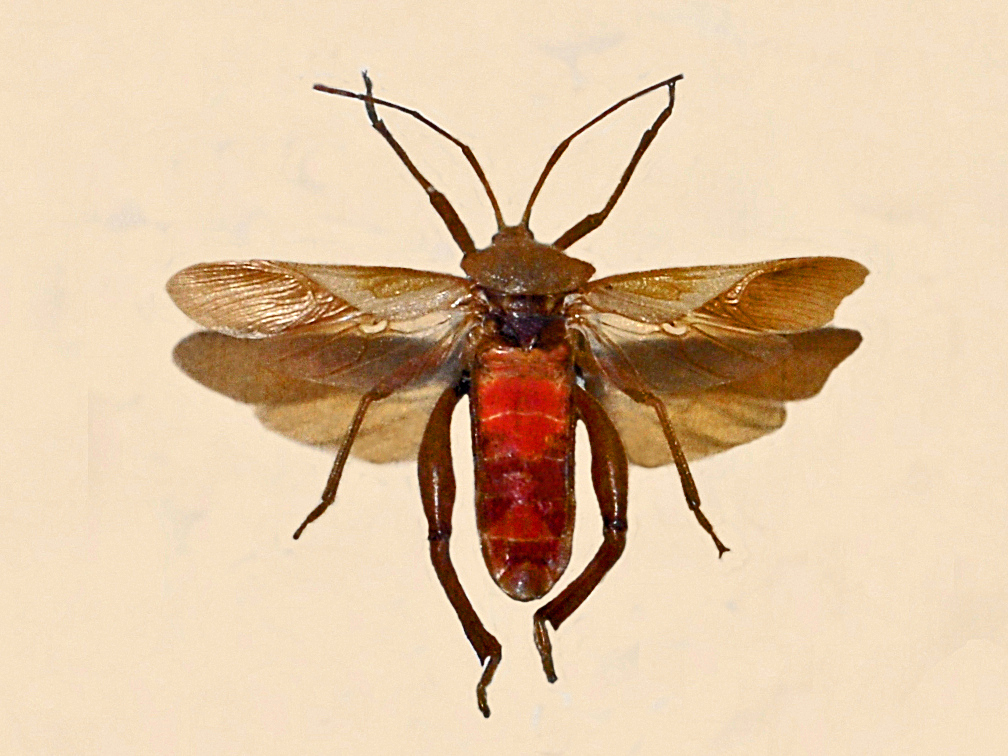
- Plectropoda cruciata from Cameroon. Museum specimen

Scientific classification
- Kingdom: Animalia
- Phylum: Arthropoda
- Class: Insecta
- Order: Hemiptera
- Suborder: Heteroptera
- Family: Coreidae
- Genus: Plectropoda
- Species: P. cruciata

Binomial name
- Plectropoda cruciata Dallas, 1852

Synonyms
- Plectrocnemia cruciata

= Plectropoda cruciata =

Species of true bug

Plectropoda cruciata is a species of squash bugs belonging to the family Coreidae.

== Distribution ==
This species can be found in the rainforest of Cameroon and Republic of the Congo.
