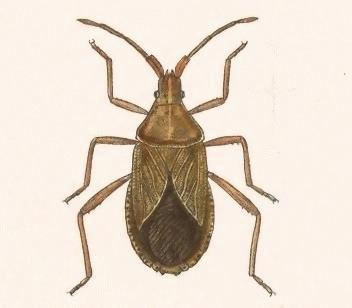
- Chelinidea tabulata, Prickly Pear Bug

Scientific classification
- Domain: Eukaryota
- Kingdom: Animalia
- Phylum: Arthropoda
- Class: Insecta
- Order: Hemiptera
- Suborder: Heteroptera
- Family: Coreidae
- Subfamily: Coreinae
- Tribe: Chelinideini
- Genus: Chelinidea; Uhler, 1863

= Chelinidea =

Genus of true bugs

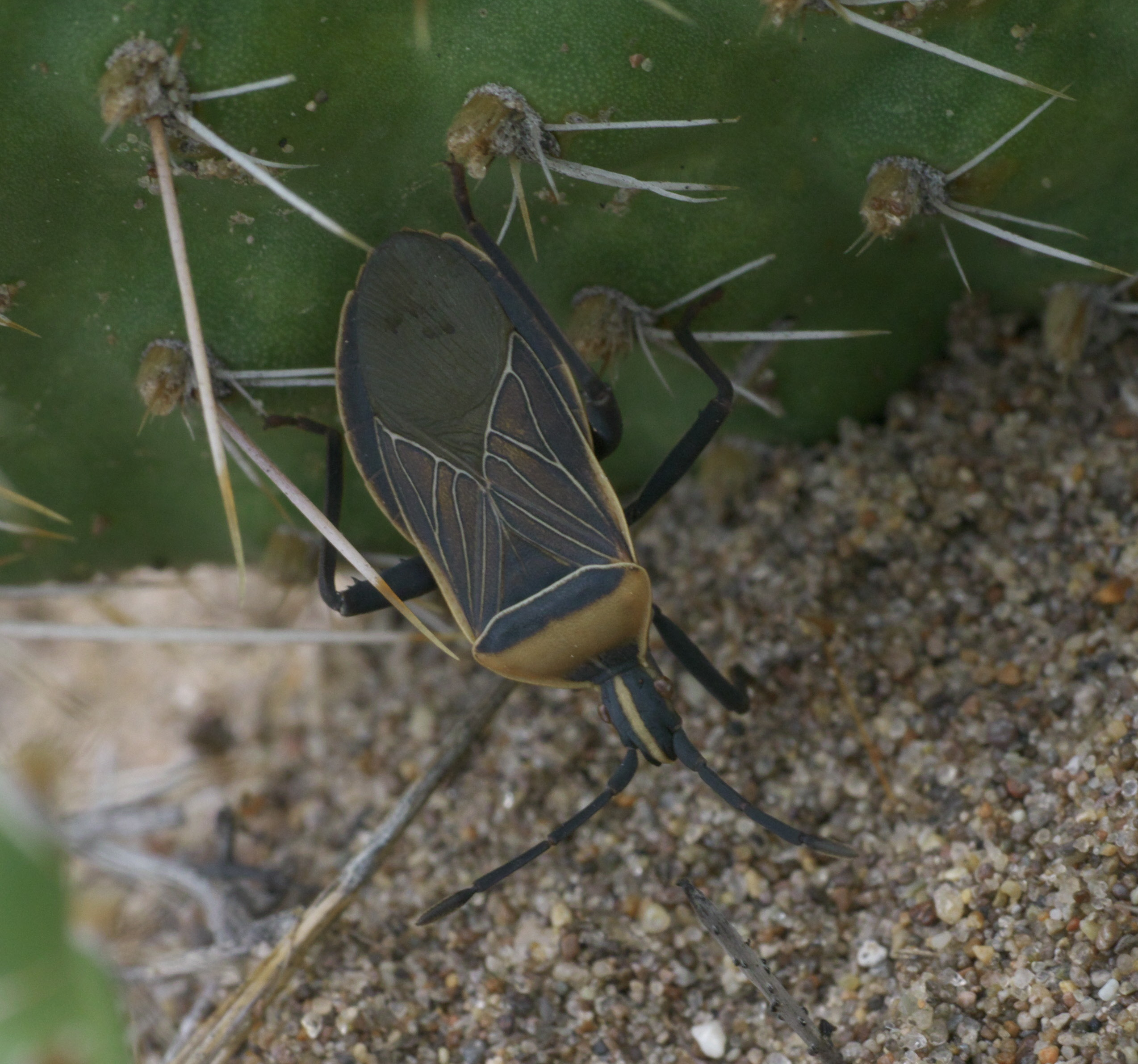
Chelinidea vittiger, cactus coreid

Chelinidea is a genus of cactus bugs in the family Coreidae, and is the sole genus of the monotypic tribe Chelinideini. There are five described species in Chelinidea, found in Central and North America, where they typically feed on cacti in the genus Opuntia. Three of these species have been introduced into Australia.

== Species ==
These five species belong to the genus Chelinidea:

- Chelinidea canyona Hamlin, 1923 (North and Central America, Australia)
- Chelinidea hunteri Hamlin, 1923 (North and Central America)
- Chelinidea staffilesi Herring, 1980 (Central America)
- Chelinidea tabulata (Burmeister, 1835) (prickly pear bug) (North, Central, and South America, Australia)
- Chelinidea vittiger Uhler, 1863 (cactus coreid) (North and Central America, Australia)
