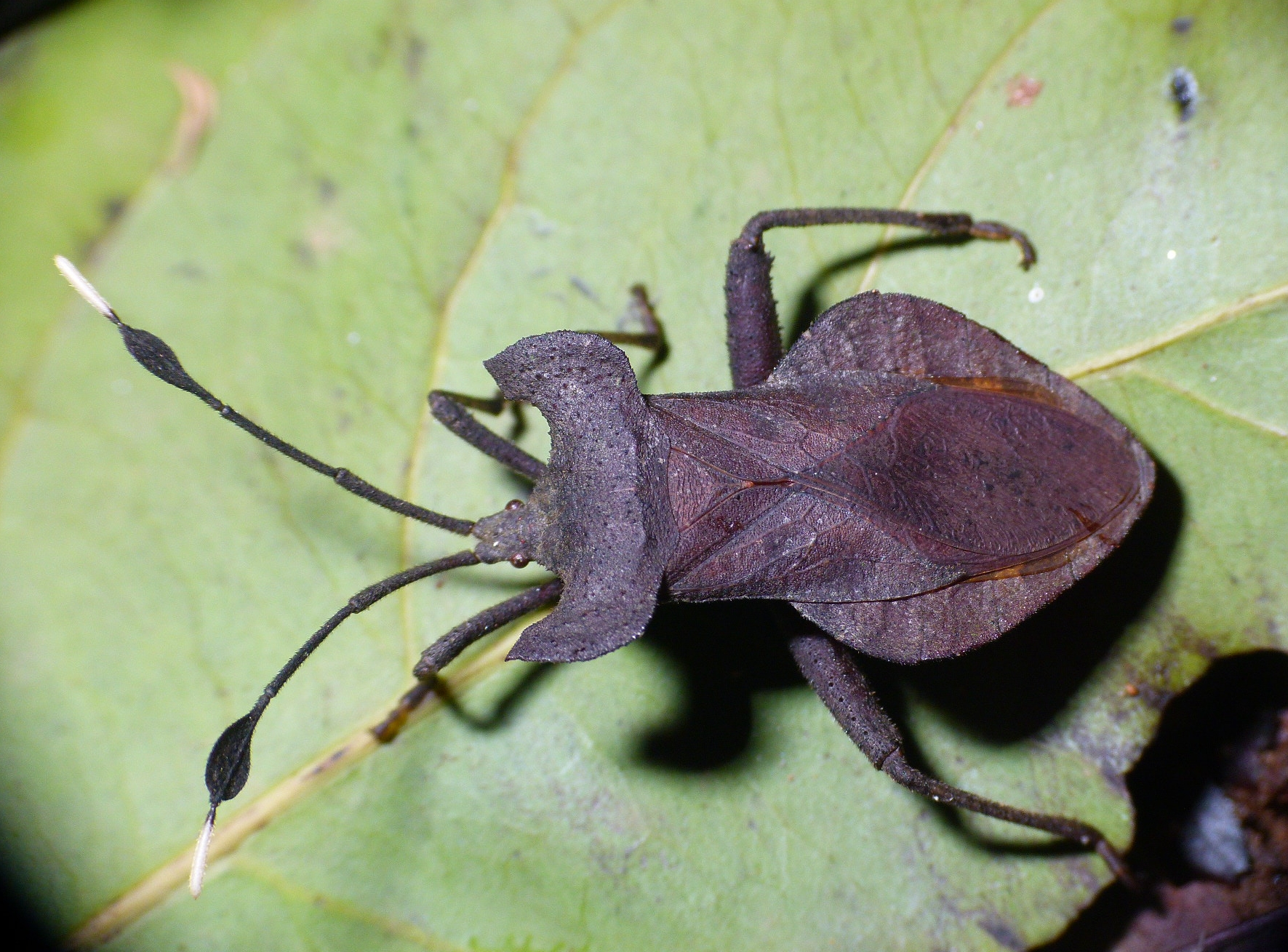
- Dalader planiventris from the Western Ghats

Scientific classification
- Domain: Eukaryota
- Kingdom: Animalia
- Phylum: Arthropoda
- Class: Insecta
- Order: Hemiptera
- Suborder: Heteroptera
- Family: Coreidae
- Subfamily: Coreinae
- Tribe: Daladerini
- Genus: Dalader; Amyot & Serville, 1843

Synonyms
- Acanonicus

= Dalader =

Genus of true bugs

Dalader is the type genus of coreid bugs in the Daladerini tribe. Species in the genus are distributed in tropical Asia, chiefly Southeast Asia. The genus name is derived from the Sanskrit roots dal meaning leaf and dhru which means bearer. This plant bug genus is distinguished by the which preterminal antennal segment being flattened, pear-shaped, and ridged and the terminal segment being paler. Chalcidoid egg parasites have been recorded from this species. Adults of Dalader acuticosta are fried and eaten in northeastern India.

== Species ==
1. D. acuticosta Amyot & Serville, 1843
2. D. anthracinus Bergroth, 1912
3. D. distanti Blöte, 1938
4. D. formosanus Esaki, 1931
5. D. horsfieldi Distant, 1900
6. D. planiventris (Westwood, 1842)
7. D. pulchrus Brailovsky, 2005
8. D. rubiginosus (Westwood, 1842)
9. D. shelfordi Distant, 1900
10. D. spinulicollis (Breddin, 1909)
11. D. sumatrensis Schmidt, 1909
  - D. sumatrensis elatus Blöte, 1938
