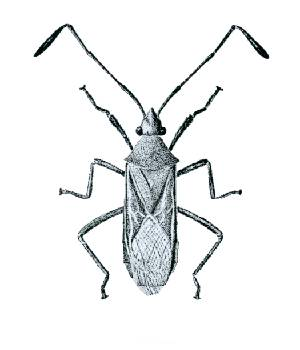
- Dasynus fuscescens (CSIRO)

Scientific classification
- Kingdom: Animalia
- Phylum: Arthropoda
- Class: Insecta
- Order: Hemiptera
- Suborder: Heteroptera
- Family: Coreidae
- Subfamily: Coreinae
- Tribe: Dasynini; Bergroth, 1913

Synonyms
- List: * Chinadasynini Li, 1997; Dasynaria Bergroth, 1913; Dasynopsini Li, 1997; Paradasynini Li, 1997; Pendulinaria Stål, 1873; Pendulini Stål, 1873; Pendulinidae Stål, 1873; Pendulinini Stål, 1873; Sinodasynini Li, 1997

= Dasynini =

Tribe of true bugs

The Dasynini are a tribe of leaf-footed bugs, in the subfamily Coreinae erected by Ernst Evald Bergroth in 1913. Genera are distributed from Africa, Asia to Australia.

== Genera ==
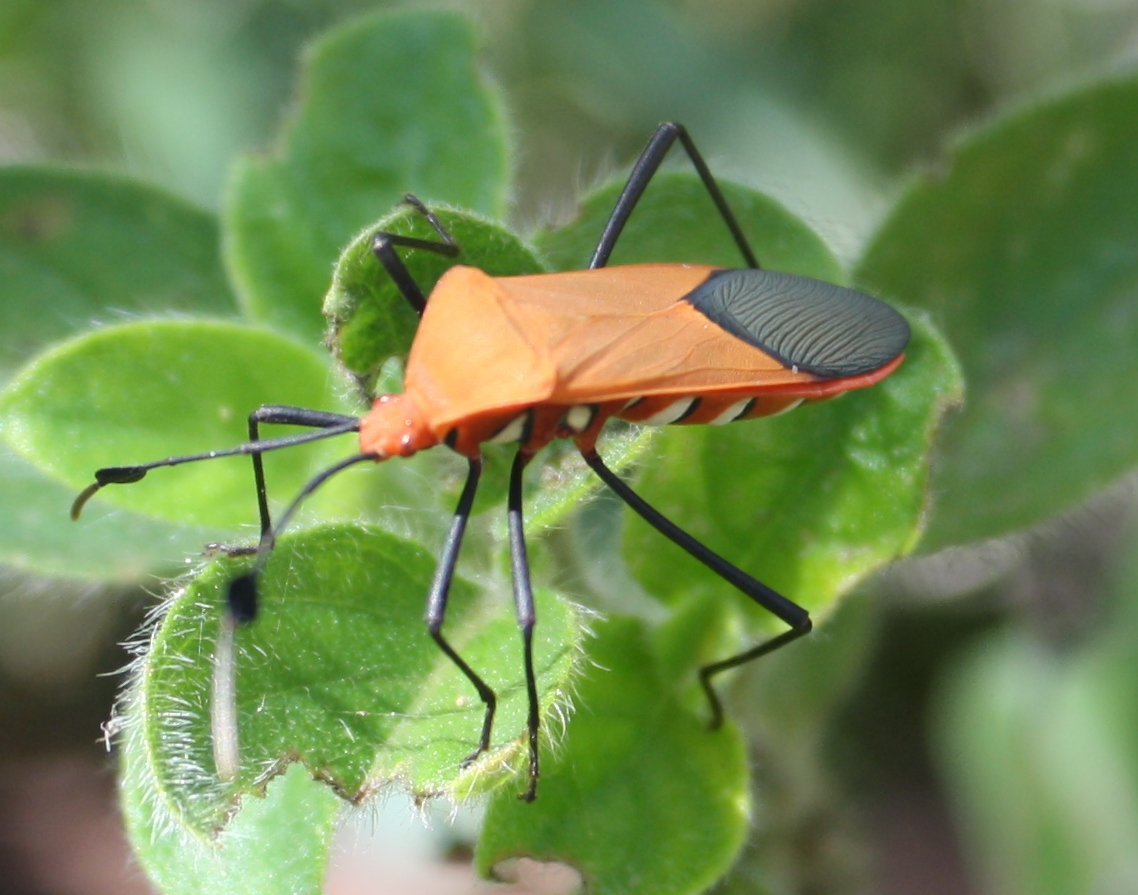
Galaesus hasticornis

The Coreoidea Species File lists:

1. Amblypelta Stål, 1873
2. Anadasynus China, 1934
3. Aulacosterjanus Brailovsky, 2002
4. Aulacosternum Dallas, 1852
5. Chinadasynus Hsiao, 1964
6. Dasynopsis Hsiao, 1963
7. Dasynus Burmeister, 1834
8. Dicorymbus Bergroth, 1918
9. Galaesus Dallas, 1852
10. Jalina Distant, 1911
11. Jalinoides Dolling, 1974
12. Madagalaesus Brailovsky, 2007
13. Odontoparia Mayr, 1865
14. Paradasynus China, 1934
15. Piramurana Distant, 1911
16. Piramuranoides Dolling, 1974
17. Pseudopendulinus Schouteden, 1938
18. Sinodasynus Hsiao, 1963
19. Theraptus Stål, 1860
20. Xenoceraea Bergroth, 1918
