= Mamurius mopsus =

Scientific classification
- Kingdom: Animalia
- Phylum: Arthropoda
- Clade: Pancrustacea
- Class: Insecta
- Order: Hemiptera
- Suborder: Heteroptera
- Family: Coreidae
- Genus: Mamurius
- Species: M. mopsus

Binomial name
- Mamurius mopsus Stål, 1862

Species of insect

Mamurius mopsus is a species of leaf-footed bug in the family Coreidae. It is found in the Caribbean Sea, Central America, and North America.
