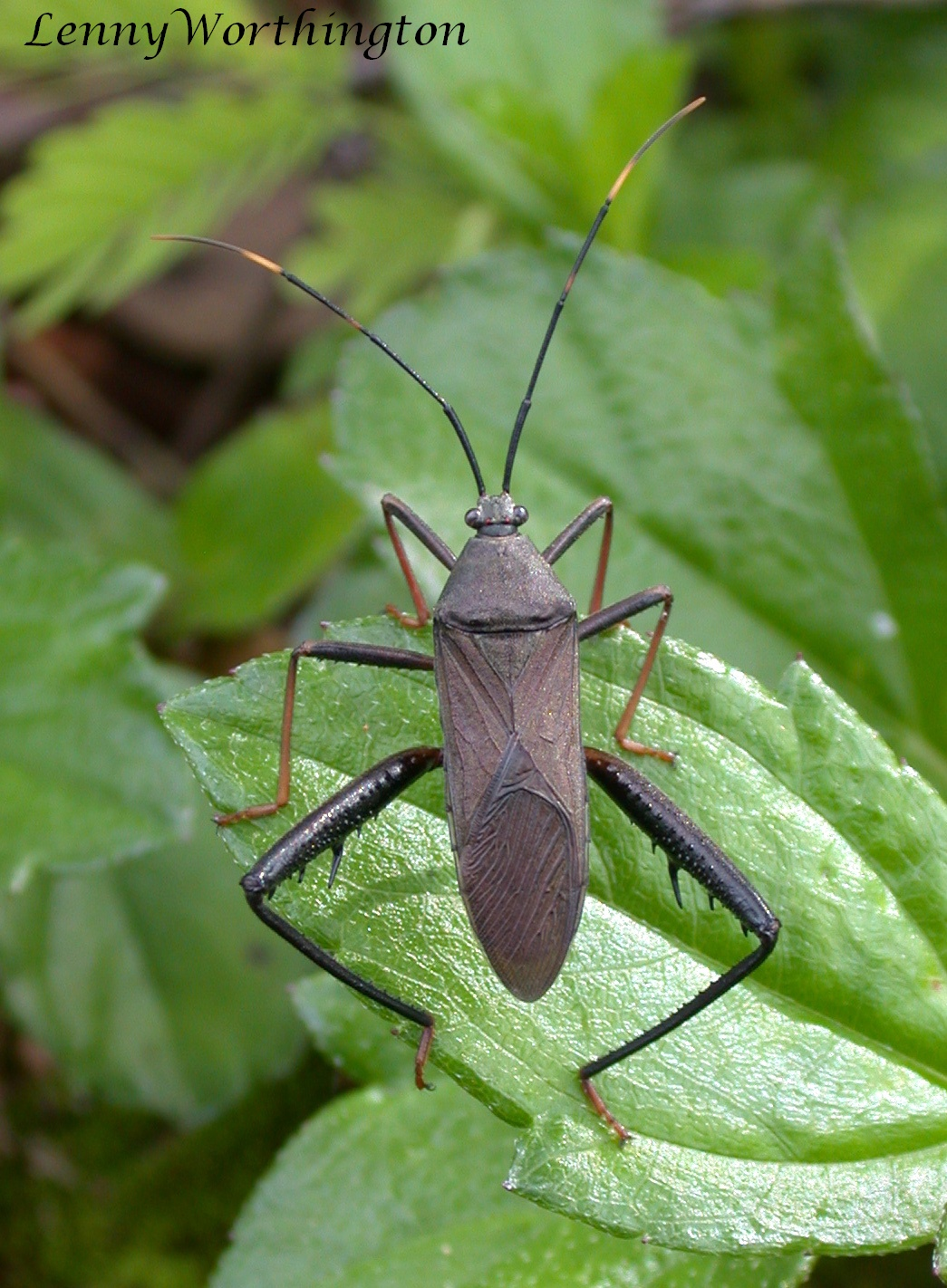
- Notobitus meleagris

Scientific classification
- Kingdom: Animalia
- Phylum: Arthropoda
- Clade: Pancrustacea
- Class: Insecta
- Order: Hemiptera
- Suborder: Heteroptera
- Family: Coreidae
- Subfamily: Coreinae
- Genus: Cloresmini; Stål, 1873

Synonyms
- Cloresmaria, Cloresmidae, Cloresminae Stål, 1873; Notobitaria Bergroth, 1913; Notobitini Bergroth, 1913

= Cloresmini =

Tribe of true bugs

The Cloresmini, sometimes called bamboo coreids, are a tribe of leaf-footed bugs, in the subfamily Coreinae erected by Carl Stål in 1873. Genera are distributed from India, China, Indochina, Malesia through to New Guinea.

== Genera and species ==
The Coreoidea Species File lists:

1. Cloresmus Stål, 1860
  1. Cloresmus antennatus Distant, 1908
  2. Cloresmus boops Blöte, 1936
  3. Cloresmus ferrinus (Walker, 1871)
  4. Cloresmus jacobsoni Blöte, 1936
  5. Cloresmus javanicus (Westwood, 1842)
  6. Cloresmus khasianus Distant, 1901
  7. Cloresmus modestus Distant, 1901
  8. Cloresmus nepalensis (Westwood, 1842)
  9. Cloresmus pulchellus Hsiao, 1963
  10. Cloresmus signoreti Stål, 1860
  11. Cloresmus similis (Dallas, 1852)
  12. Cloresmus yunnanensis Hsiao, 1963
2. Notobitiella Hsiao, 1963 - monotypic N. elegans Hsiao, 1963
3. Notobitus Stål, 1860
  1. Notobitus abdominalis Distant, 1901
  2. Notobitus affinis (Dallas, 1852)
  3. Notobitus bambusae Henry, 1931
  4. Notobitus celebensis Breddin, 1901
  5. Notobitus dorsalis (Westwood, 1842)
  6. Notobitus elongatus Hsiao, 1977
  7. Notobitus excellens Distant, 1879
  8. Notobitus femoralis Chen, 1986
  9. Notobitus humeralis Blöte, 1936
  10. Notobitus marginalis (Westwood, 1842)
  11. Notobitus meleagris (Fabricius, 1787)
  12. Notobitus montanus Hsiao, 1963
  13. Notobitus mundus Distant, 1908
  14. Notobitus pallicornis (Dallas, 1852)
  15. Notobitus papuensis Horváth, 1900
  16. Notobitus parvus Distant, 1908
  17. Notobitus serripes (Dallas, 1850)
  18. Notobitus sexguttatus (Westwood, 1842)
4. Priocnemicoris Costa, 1863
  1. Priocnemicoris antennatus Brailovsky & Barrera, 2007
  2. Priocnemicoris bicoloripes Brailovsky & Barrera, 2007
  3. Priocnemicoris cyclops Brailovsky & Barrera, 2007
  4. Priocnemicoris diversipes (Fallou, 1891)
  5. Priocnemicoris doesburgi Brailovsky & Barrera, 2007
  6. Priocnemicoris flaviceps (Guérin-Méneville, 1831)
  7. Priocnemicoris kiungensis Brailovsky & Barrera, 2007
  8. Priocnemicoris morobe Brailovsky & Barrera, 2007
  9. Priocnemicoris nigrellus Brailovsky & Barrera, 2007
  10. Priocnemicoris papuensis Brailovsky & Barrera, 2007
5. Wasbauerellus Brailovsky, 2007 - monotypic W. modicus (Brailovsky, 2006)
