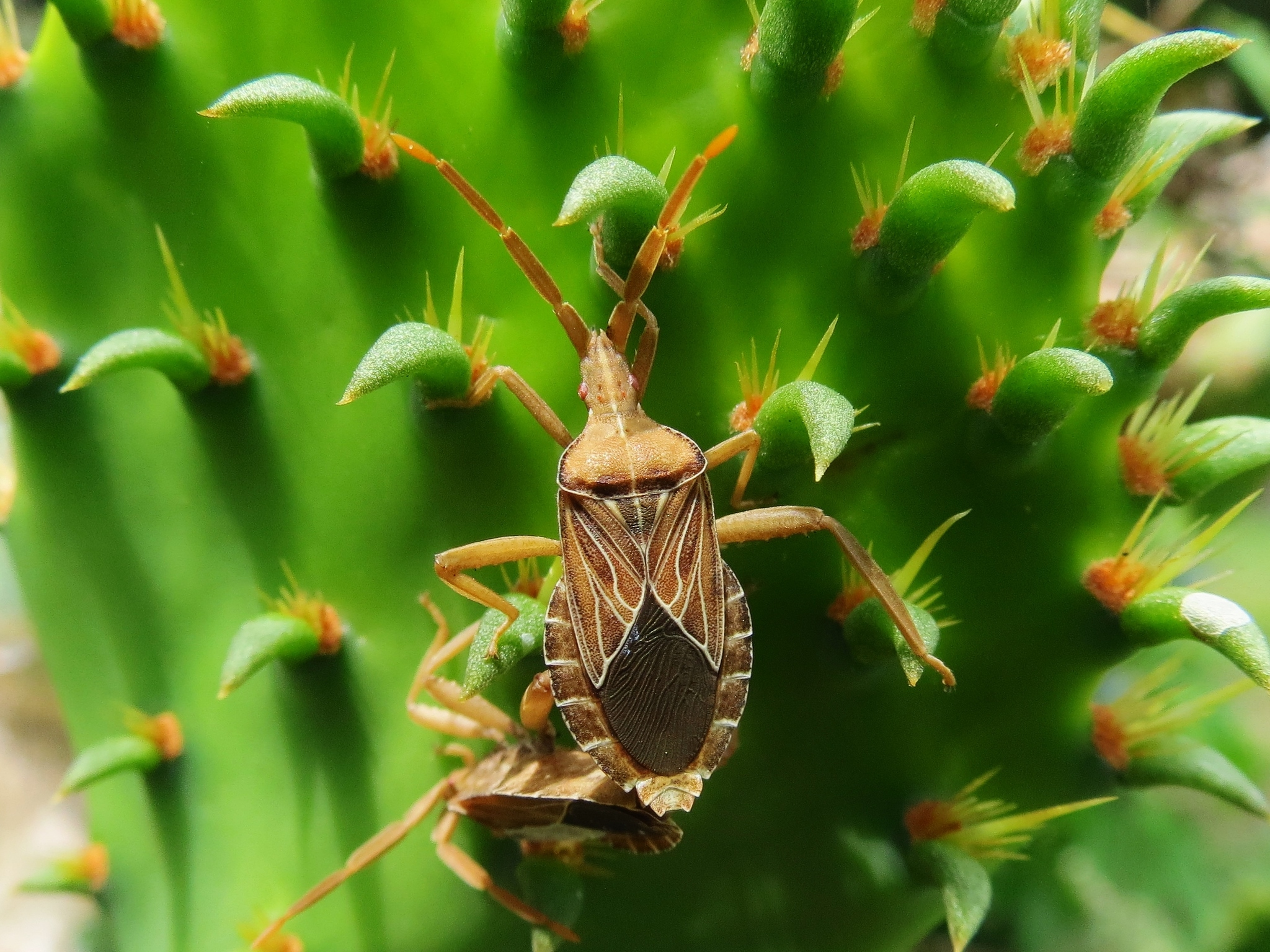

Scientific classification
- Kingdom: Animalia
- Phylum: Arthropoda
- Clade: Pancrustacea
- Class: Insecta
- Order: Hemiptera
- Suborder: Heteroptera
- Family: Coreidae
- Genus: Chelinidea
- Species: C. tabulata

Binomial name
- Chelinidea tabulata (Burmeister, 1835)

= Chelinidea tabulata =

Species of true bug

Chelinidea tabulata is a species of leaf-footed bugs in the family Coreidae. It is found in Central America, North America, and South America.
