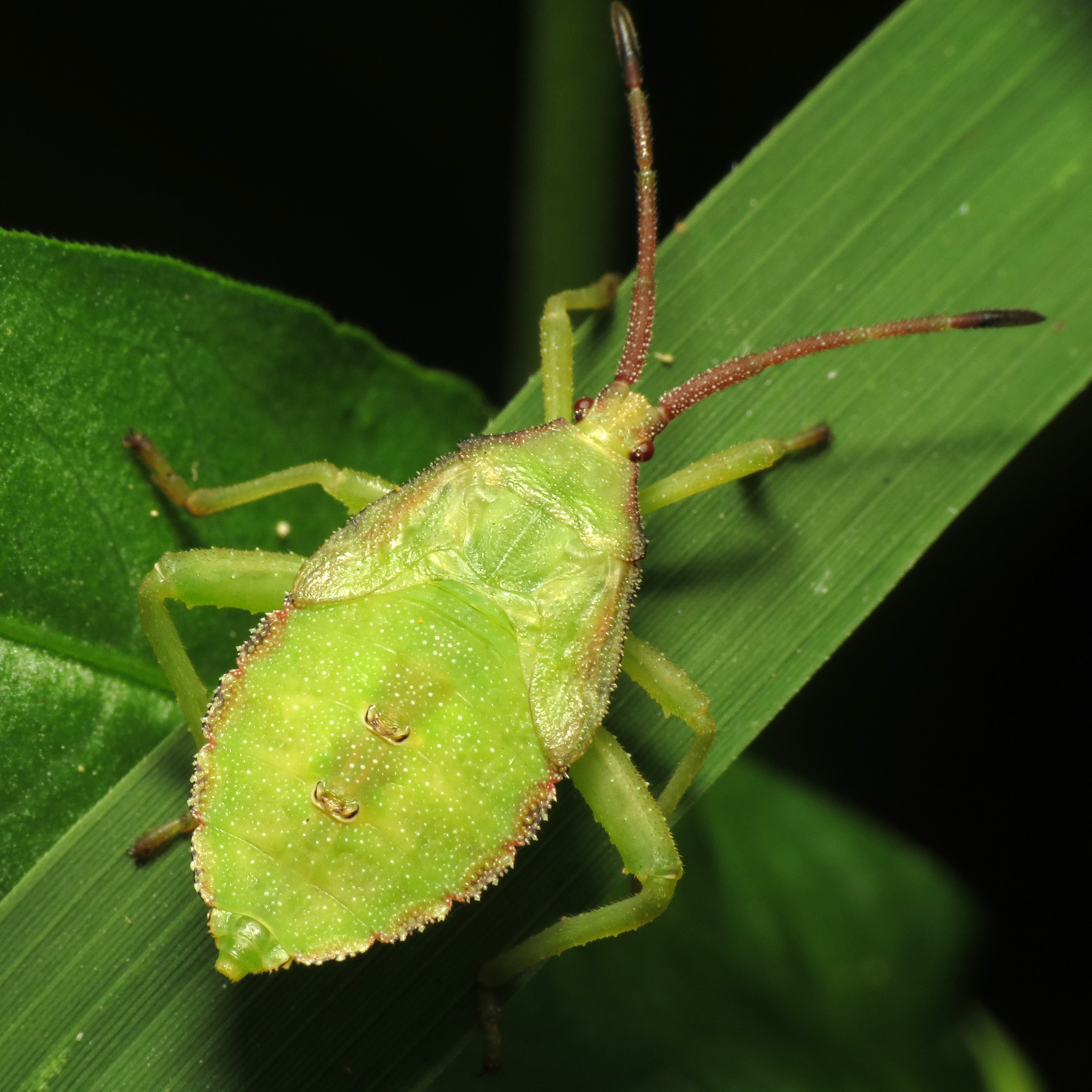
- Piezogaster sp. Nymph

Scientific classification
- Domain: Eukaryota
- Kingdom: Animalia
- Phylum: Arthropoda
- Class: Insecta
- Order: Hemiptera
- Suborder: Heteroptera
- Family: Coreidae
- Subfamily: Coreinae
- Genus: Piezogaster; Amyot & Serville, 1843

Synonyms
- Acanthobolus Stål, 1870; Capaneus Stål, 1862

= Piezogaster =

Genus of true bugs

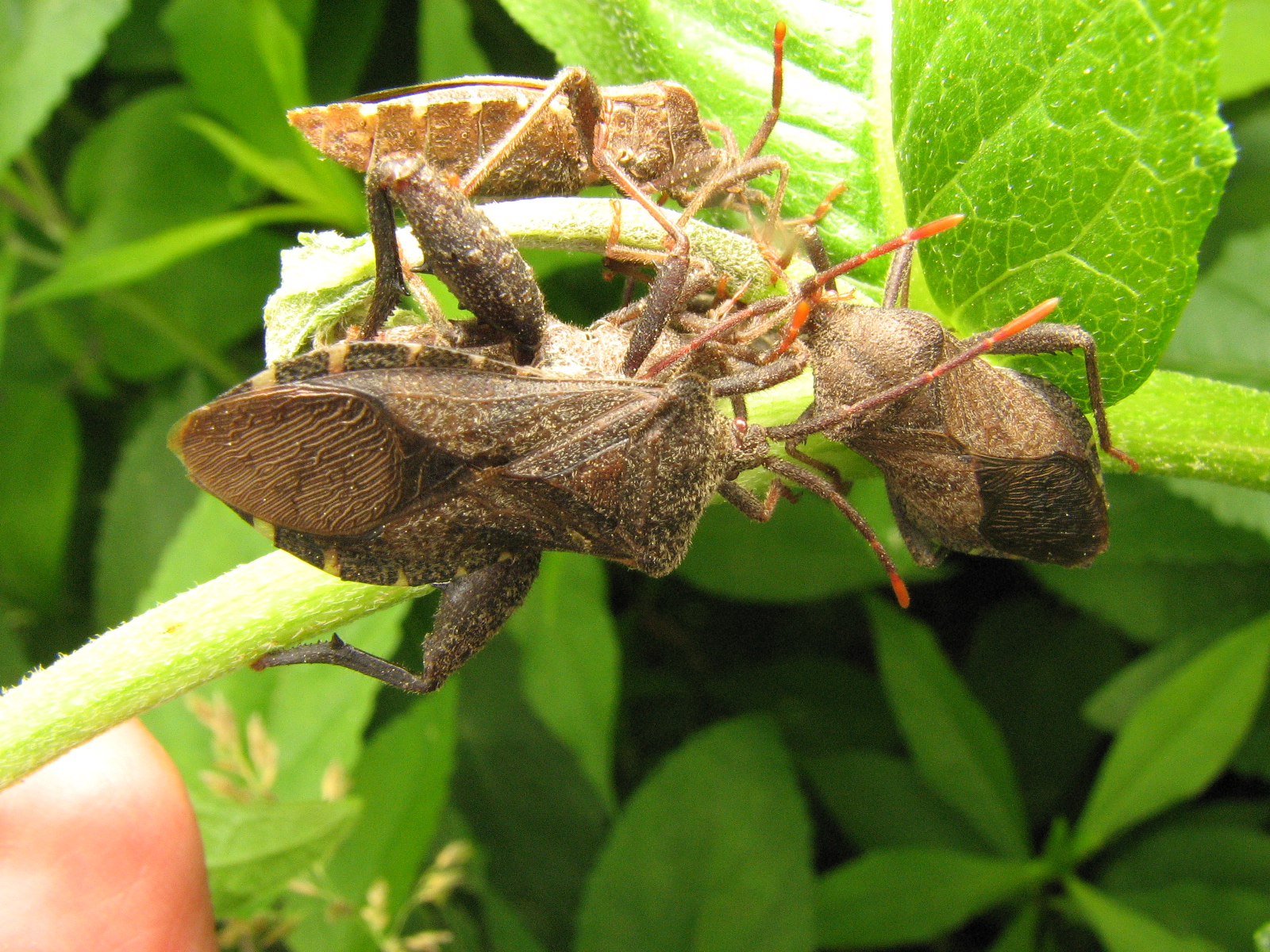
Piezogaster sp. mating group

Piezogaster is a genus of leaf-footed bugs in the family Coreidae. There are at least 30 described species in Piezogaster.

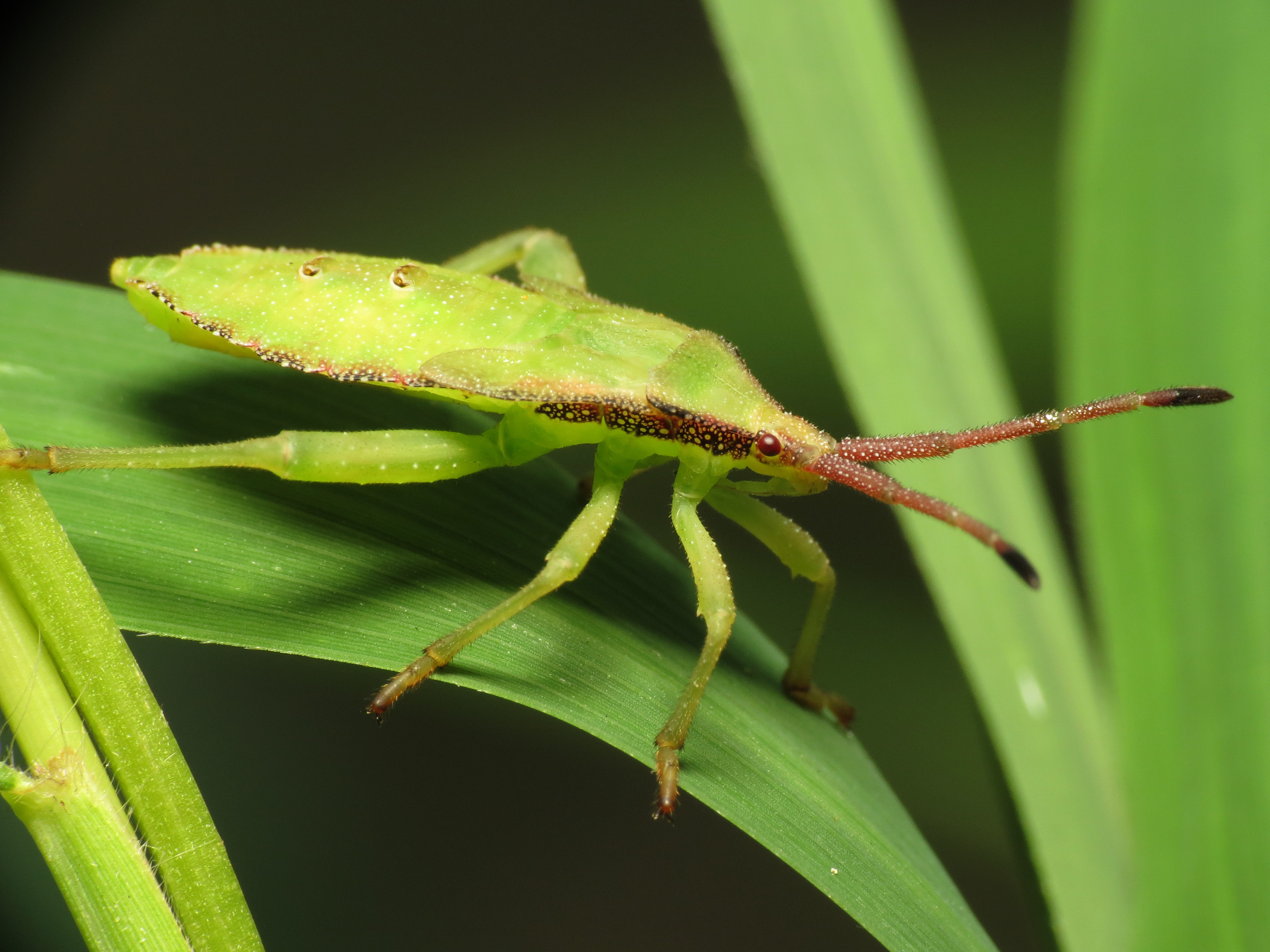
Nymph

== Species ==
These 33 species belong to the genus Piezogaster:

- Piezogaster achillelus Brailovsky and Barrera, 2000^{i c g}
- Piezogaster achilles (Stål, 1862)^{i c g}
- Piezogaster acuminatus Brailovsky, 1993^{i c g}
- Piezogaster ashmeadi (Montandon, 1899)^{i c g}
- Piezogaster auriculatus (Stål, 1862)^{i c g}
- Piezogaster basilicus Brailovsky and Barrera, 1984^{i c g}
- Piezogaster bolivianus Brailovsky, 1993^{i c g}
- Piezogaster calcarator (Fabricius, 1803)^{i c g b}
- Piezogaster camposi (Montandon, 1897)^{i c g}
- Piezogaster chiriquinus (Distant, 1892)^{i c g}
- Piezogaster chontalensis (Distant, 1892)^{i c g}
- Piezogaster congruus Brailovsky, 1984^{i c g}
- Piezogaster dilatatus (Dallas, 1852)^{i c g}
- Piezogaster herrichi (Blöte, 1938)^{i c g}
- Piezogaster humeralis (Distant, 1901)^{i c g}
- Piezogaster humerosus (Distant, 1892)^{i c g}
- Piezogaster indecorus (Walker, 1871)^{i c g b}
- Piezogaster lacrimiferous Brailovsky, 2001^{i c g}
- Piezogaster loricata (Distant, 1892)^{i c g}
- Piezogaster multispinus (Stål, 1862)^{i c g}
- Piezogaster oblatus Brailovsky, 2001^{i c g}
- Piezogaster obscuratus (Montandon, 1899)^{i c g}
- Piezogaster odiosus (Stål, 1862)^{i c g}
- Piezogaster orbicularis Brailovsky, 2001^{i c g}
- Piezogaster reclusus Brailovsky and Barrera, 2000^{i c g}
- Piezogaster rubronotatus (Stål, 1862)^{i c g}
- Piezogaster rubropictus (Montandon, 1897)^{i c g}
- Piezogaster scitus Brailovsky and Barrera, 1984^{i c g}
- Piezogaster scutellaris Stål, 1862^{i c g}
- Piezogaster spurcus (Stål, 1862)^{i c g b}
- Piezogaster tetricus (Stål, 1862)^{i c g}
- Piezogaster thoracicus (Distant, 1881)^{i c g}
- Piezogaster vates (Stål, 1862)^{i c g}

Data sources: i = ITIS, c = Catalogue of Life, g = GBIF, b = Bugguide.net
