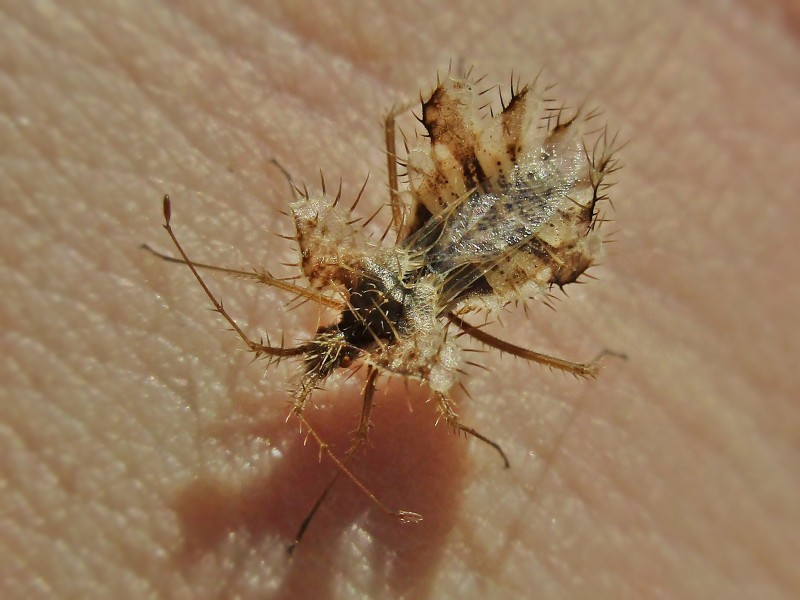

Scientific classification
- Domain: Eukaryota
- Kingdom: Animalia
- Phylum: Arthropoda
- Class: Insecta
- Order: Hemiptera
- Suborder: Heteroptera
- Family: Coreidae
- Genus: Phyllomorpha
- Species: P. laciniata

Binomial name
- Phyllomorpha laciniata (Villers, 1789)

Synonyms
- Cimex laciniatus Villers, 1789; Coreus hystrix Latreille, 1817; Coreus gallicus Germar, 1822; Aradus muricatus Jaeger, 1827; Coreus histrix Gray, 1832; Phyllomorpha algerica Guérin-Méneville, 1839; Phyllomorpha algirica Guérin-Méneville, 1839; Phyllomorpha erinaceus Herrich-Schäffer, 1842; Coreus erinaceus Germar, 1847; Phyllomorpha laciniata brevispina Wagner, 1955; Phyllomorpha laciniata montandon Zange, 2005

= Phyllomorpha laciniata =

Species of true bug

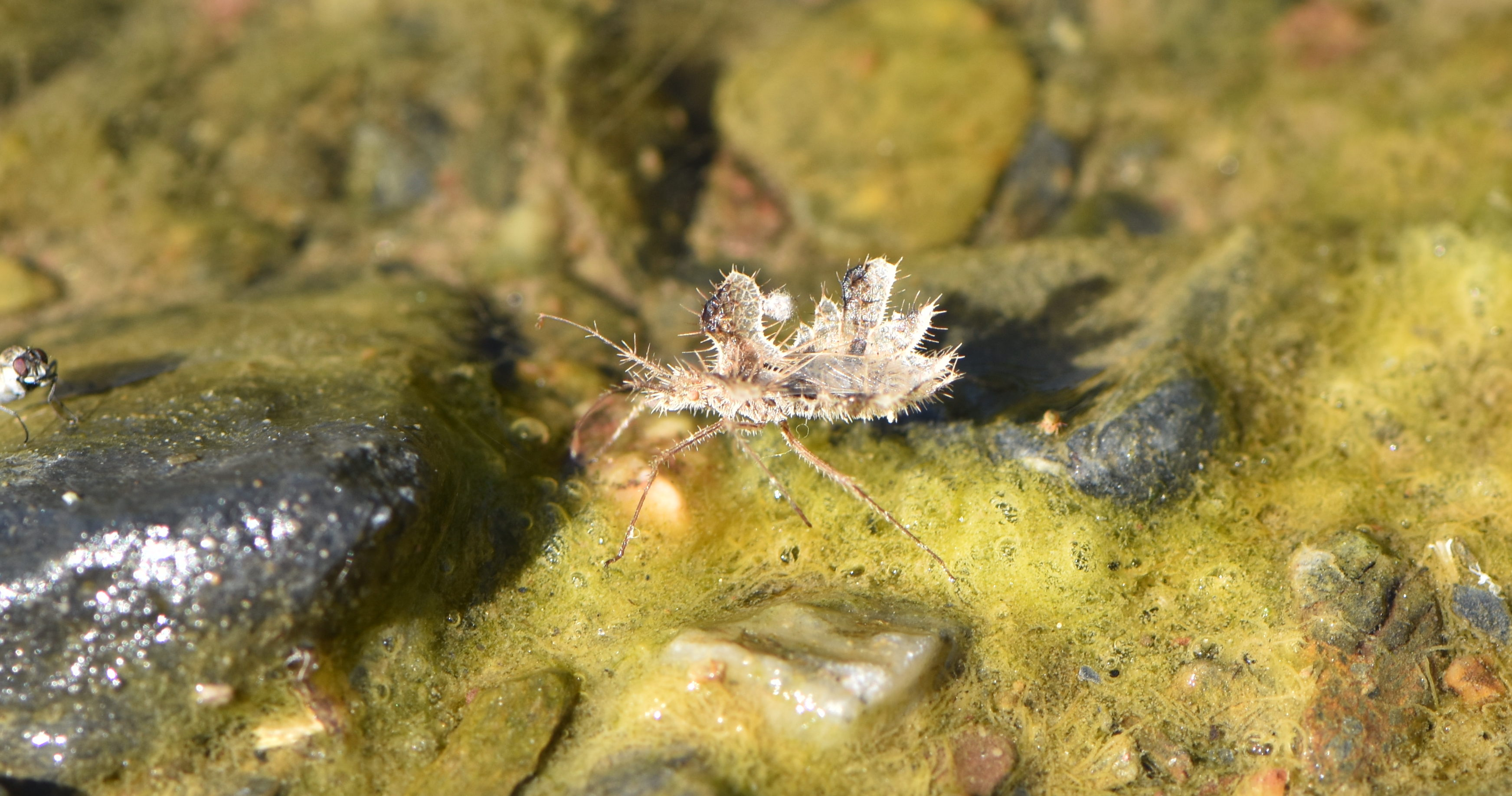
Phyllomorpha laciniata

Phyllomorpha laciniata (the golden egg bug) is a species of coreid bug, and one of only two members of the genus Phyllomorpha. They are specific to the host plant Paronychia argentea. It is noted for its habit of laying its eggs on other members of its species, who act as mobile nests (oviposition substrate). These co-opted egg carriers provide more protection for the eggs than laying them at static locations on plant leaves or stems. While Phyllomorpha laciniata females can and do lay eggs on their host plant, the availability of suitable egg carriers seems to stimulate the deposition of mature eggs. In the golden egg bug, all females carry other female’s eggs, and most males carry eggs they have not fertilized.

== Taxonomy ==
This species was formally described by Charles Joseph de Villers in 1789, under the name Cimex laciniatus.
