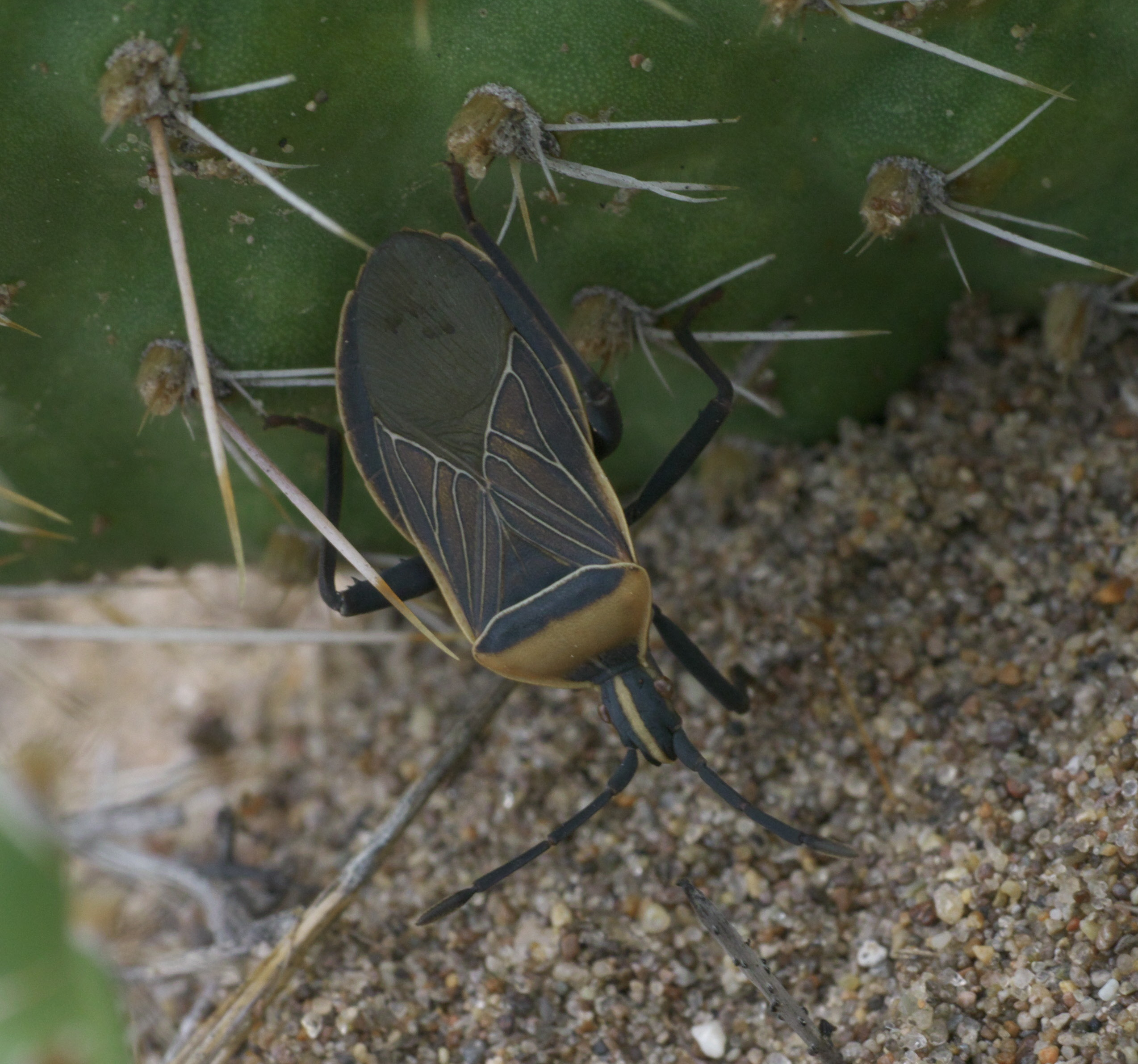

Scientific classification
- Kingdom: Animalia
- Phylum: Arthropoda
- Clade: Pancrustacea
- Class: Insecta
- Order: Hemiptera
- Suborder: Heteroptera
- Family: Coreidae
- Tribe: Chelinideini
- Genus: Chelinidea
- Species: C. vittiger

Binomial name
- Chelinidea vittiger Uhler, 1863

= Chelinidea vittiger =

Species of true bug

Chelinidea vittiger, known generally as cactus coreid, is a species of leaf-footed bug in the family Coreidae. Other common names include the squash bug and cactus bug. It is found in Australia, Central America, and North America.

== Gallery ==
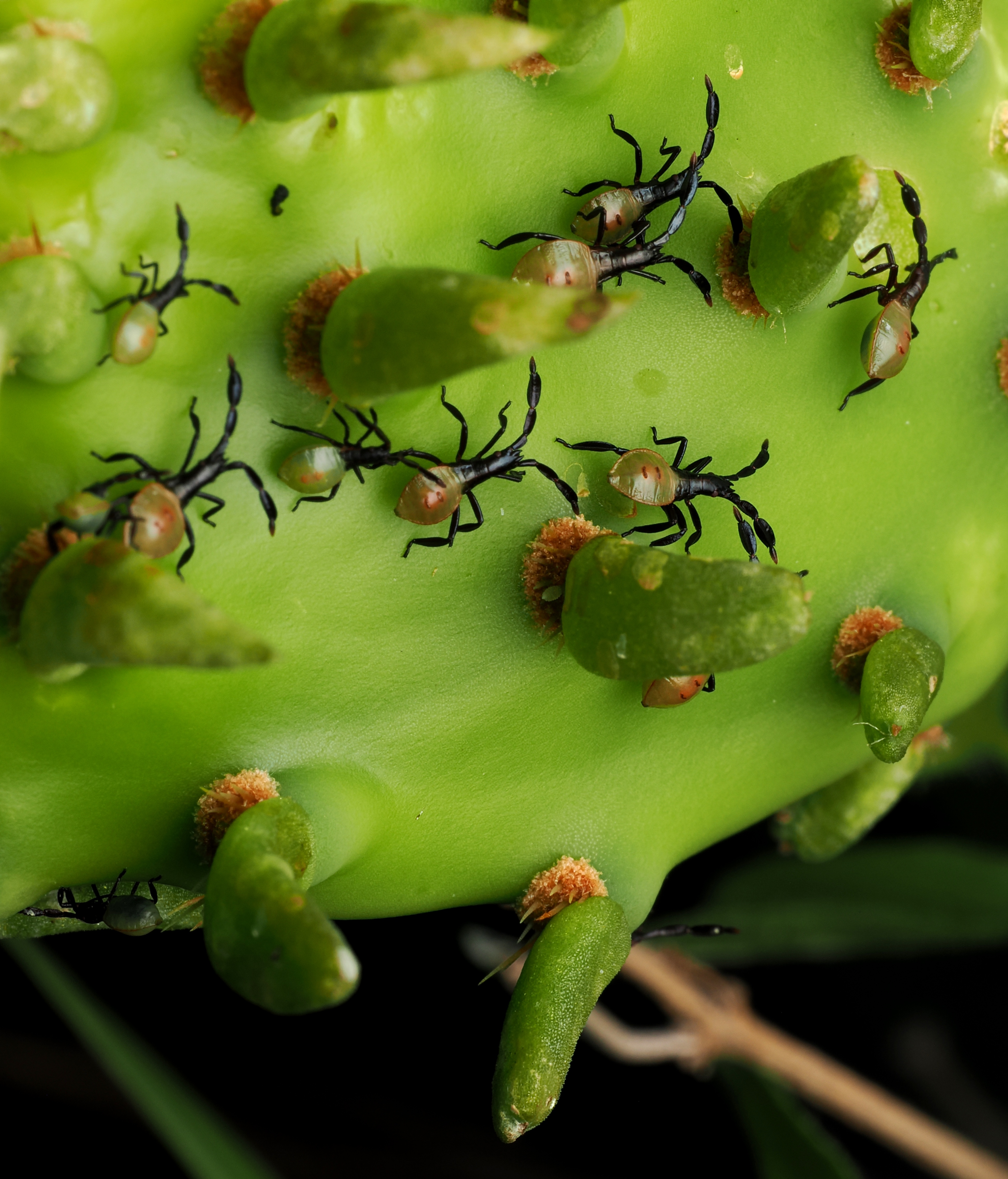
Nymph from San Marcos, Texas
