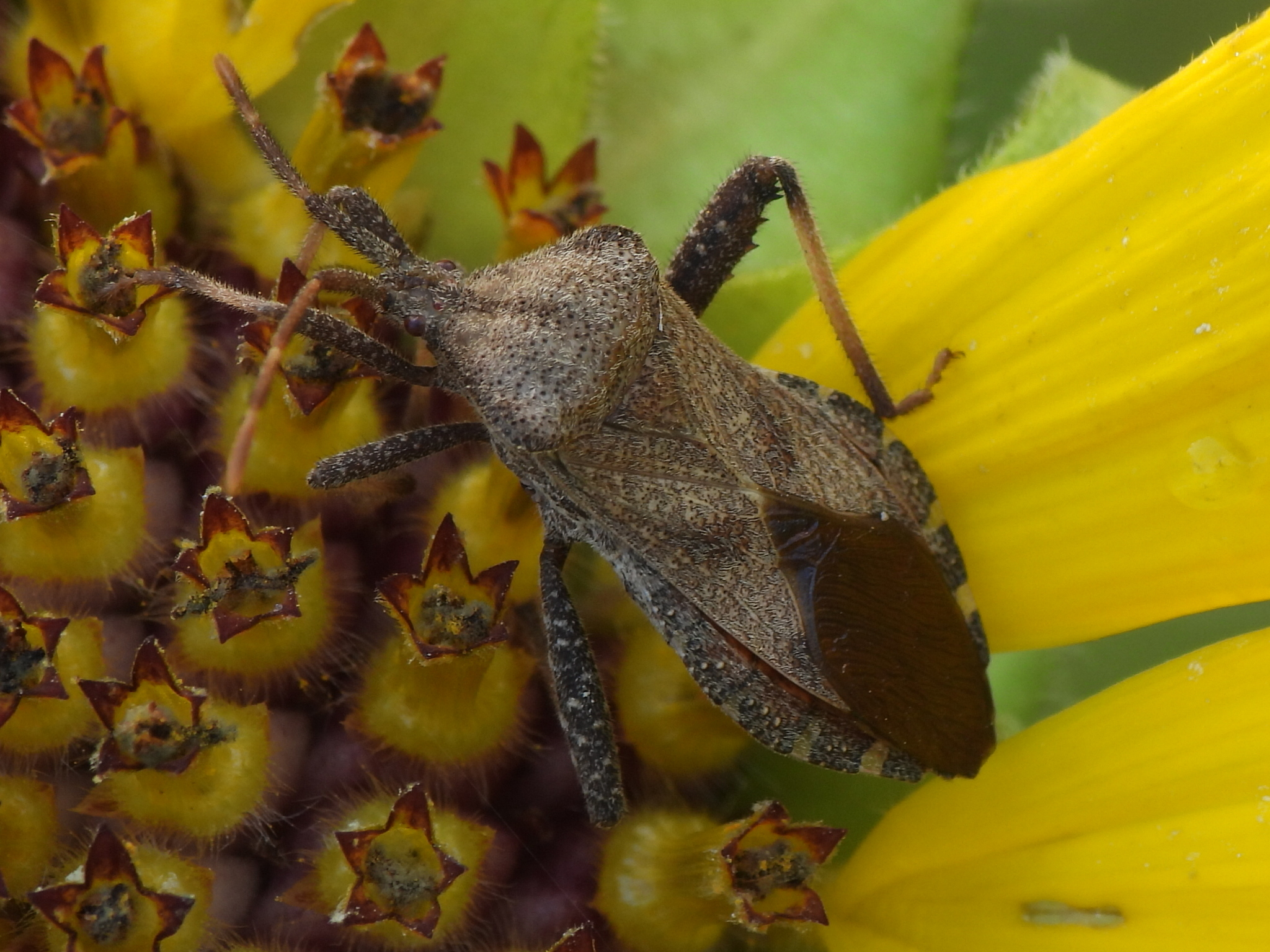
- Piezogaster calcarator

Scientific classification
- Kingdom: Animalia
- Phylum: Arthropoda
- Clade: Pancrustacea
- Class: Insecta
- Order: Hemiptera
- Suborder: Heteroptera
- Family: Coreidae
- Genus: Piezogaster
- Species: P. calcarator

Binomial name
- Piezogaster calcarator (Fabricius, 1803)

Synonyms
- Piezogaster albonotatus Amyot and Serville, 1843

= Piezogaster calcarator =

Species of true bug

Piezogaster calcarator alternatively known as the is a species of leaf-footed bug in the family Coreidae.

== Description ==
The species has brownish-grey thighs (described as fuscous). The insect is spinous, and the margin of the abdomen is black, five white spots are present. The head is not pointed but is rather blunted.
