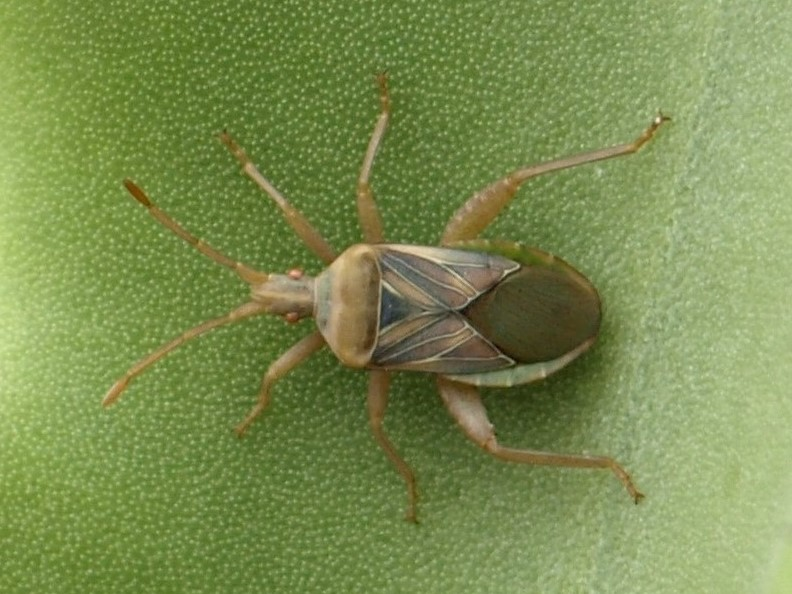

Scientific classification
- Domain: Eukaryota
- Kingdom: Animalia
- Phylum: Arthropoda
- Class: Insecta
- Order: Hemiptera
- Suborder: Heteroptera
- Family: Coreidae
- Tribe: Chelinideini
- Genus: Chelinidea
- Species: C. hunteri

Binomial name
- Chelinidea hunteri Hamlin, 1923

= Chelinidea hunteri =

Species of true bug

Chelinidea hunteri is a species of leaf-footed bug in the family Coreidae. It is endemic to the Sonoran Desert.
