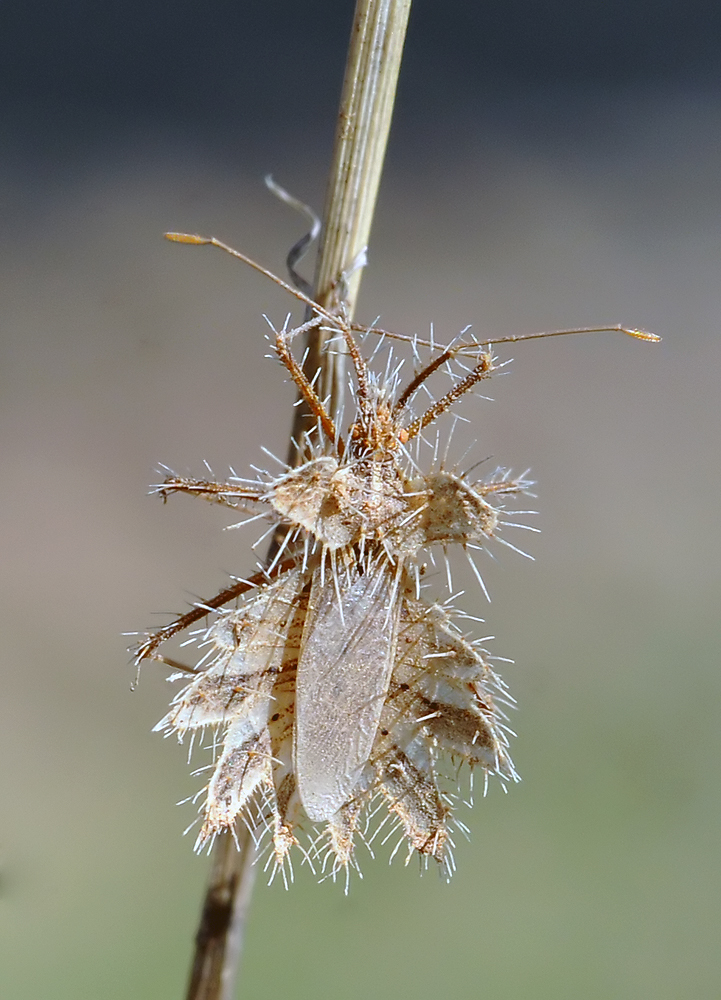

Scientific classification
- Domain: Eukaryota
- Kingdom: Animalia
- Phylum: Arthropoda
- Class: Insecta
- Order: Hemiptera
- Suborder: Heteroptera
- Family: Coreidae
- Genus: Phyllomorpha
- Species: P. lacerata

Binomial name
- Phyllomorpha lacerata Herrich-Schäffer, 1835

Synonyms
- Phyllomorpha persica Westwood, 1841; Paranotocoris echinus Ahmad & Shadab, 1973

= Phyllomorpha lacerata =

Species of true bug

Phyllomorpha lacerata is a species of coreid bug, and one of only two members of the genus Phyllomorpha.
