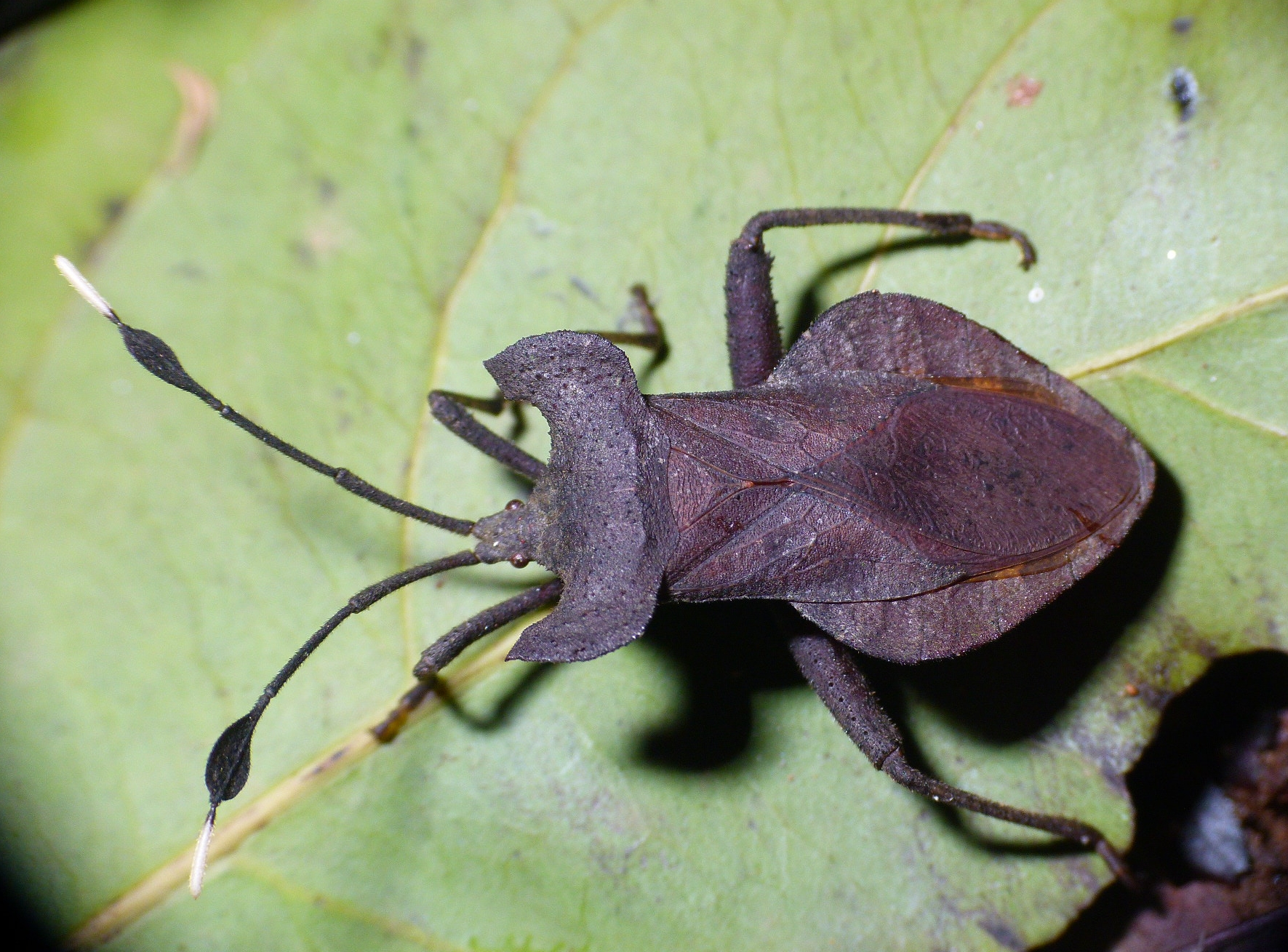
- Dalader cf. planiventris

Scientific classification
- Kingdom: Animalia
- Phylum: Arthropoda
- Clade: Pancrustacea
- Class: Insecta
- Order: Hemiptera
- Suborder: Heteroptera
- Family: Coreidae
- Subfamily: Coreinae
- Tribe: Daladerini; Stål, 1873

= Daladerini =

Genus of true bugs

The Daladerini are a tribe of leaf-footed bugs, in the subfamily Coreinae erected by Carl Stål in 1873. Genera are distributed from Africa to South-East Asia.

== Genera ==
The Coreoidea Species File lists:

1. Brachytes Westwood, 1842
2. Dalader Amyot & Serville, 1843
3. Daladeropsis Karsch, 1894
4. Elasmogaster Stål, 1854
5. Hormambogaster Karsch, 1892
6. Kerzhnercryptes Brailovsky, 2002
7. Odontocurtus Brailovsky, 2011
8. Odontorhopala Stål, 1873
9. Parabrachytes Distant, 1879
10. Rhombolaparus Bergroth, 1906

== Gallery ==
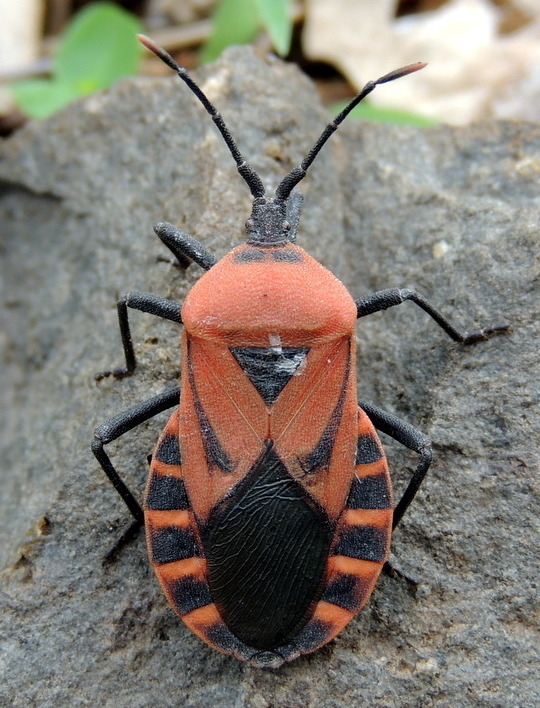
Brachytes bicolor

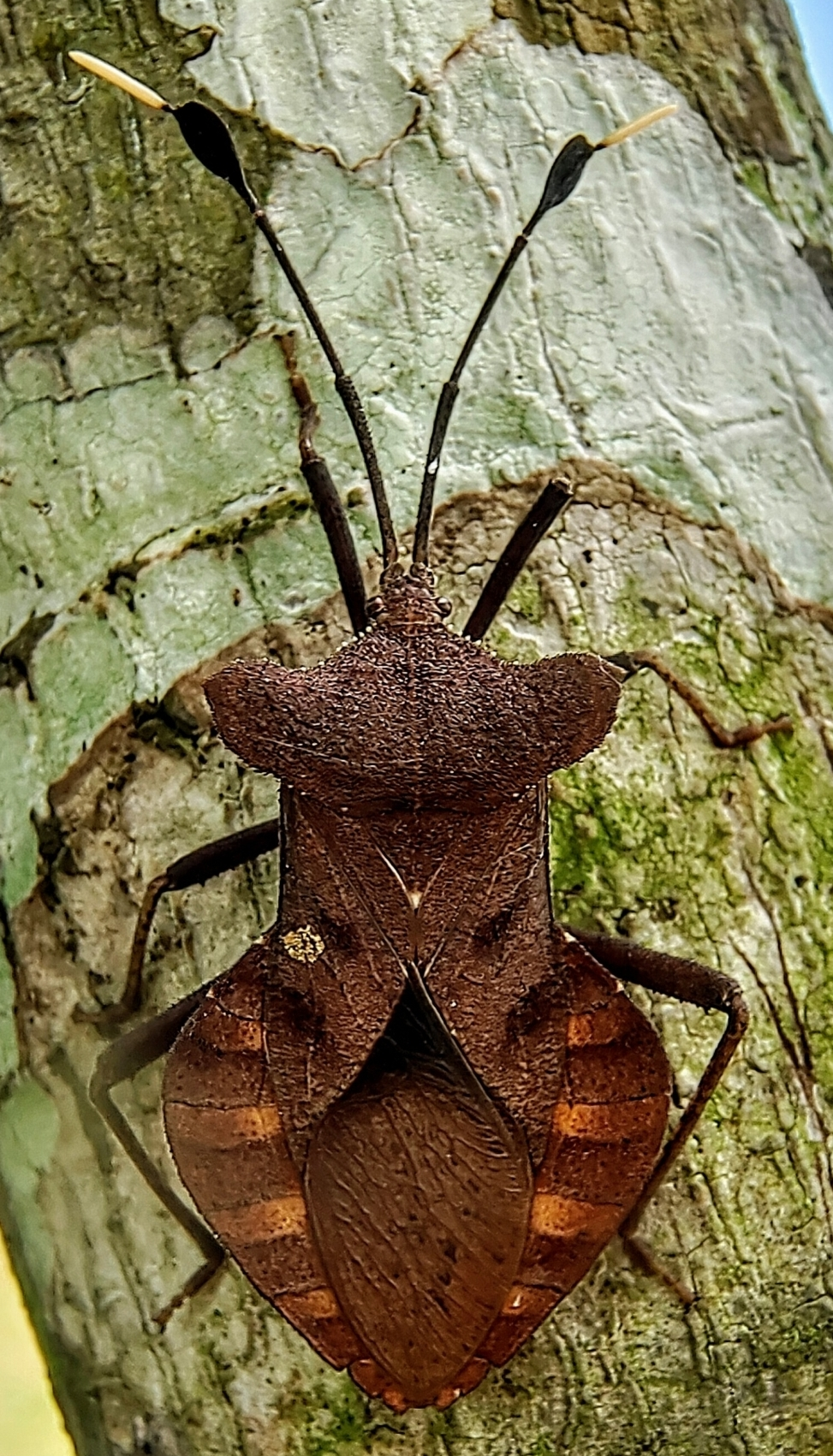
Dalader planiventris

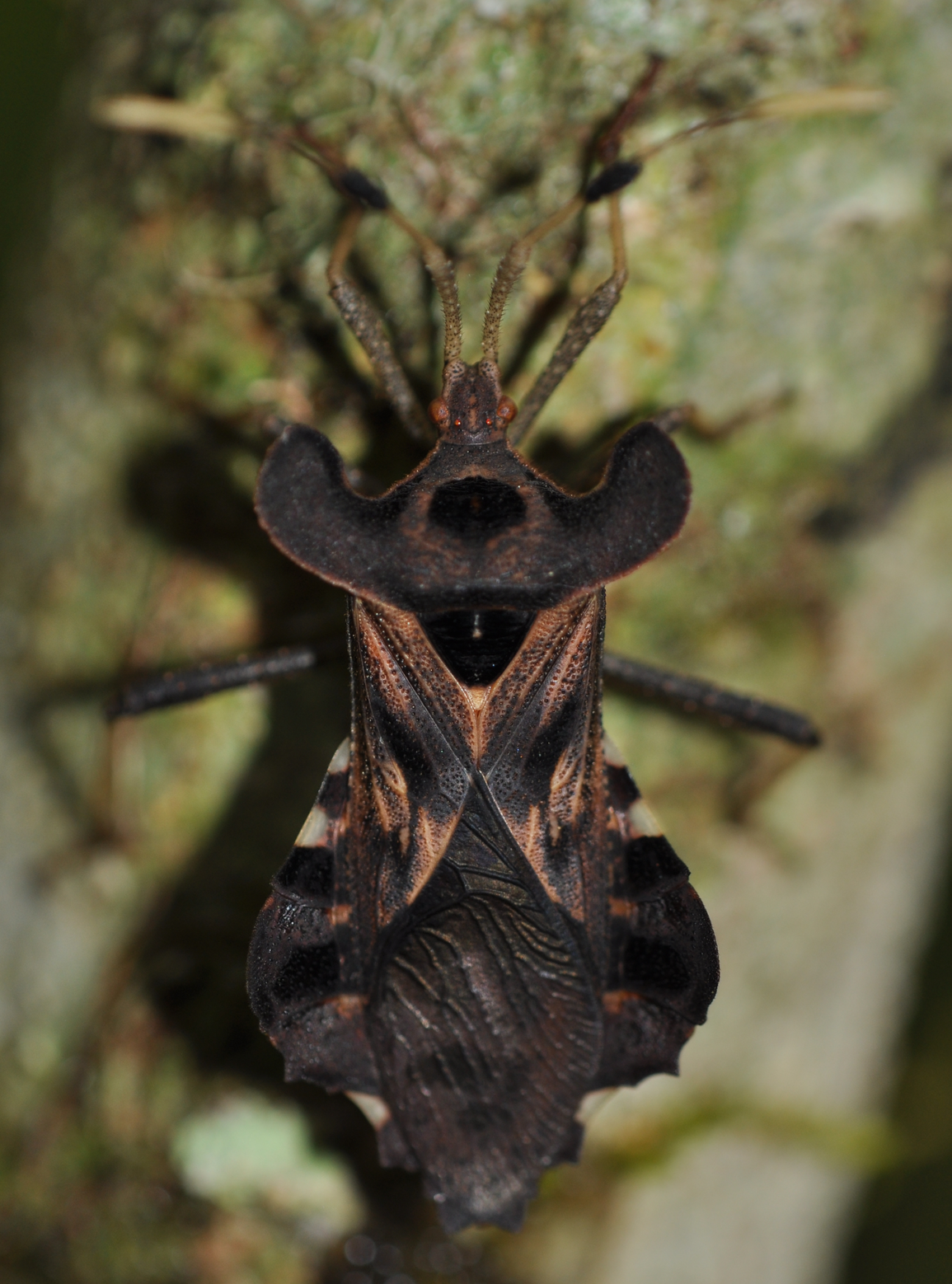
Odontorhopala callosa
