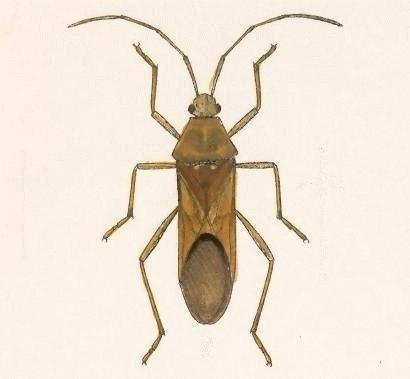
- Savius jurgiosus

Scientific classification
- Kingdom: Animalia
- Phylum: Arthropoda
- Clade: Pancrustacea
- Class: Insecta
- Order: Hemiptera
- Suborder: Heteroptera
- Family: Coreidae
- Subfamily: Coreinae
- Tribe: Discogastrini; Stål, 1868

= Discogastrini =

Tribe of true bugs

Discogastrini is a tribe of leaf-footed bugs in the family Coreidae. There are about 8 genera and more than 40 described species in Discogastrini.

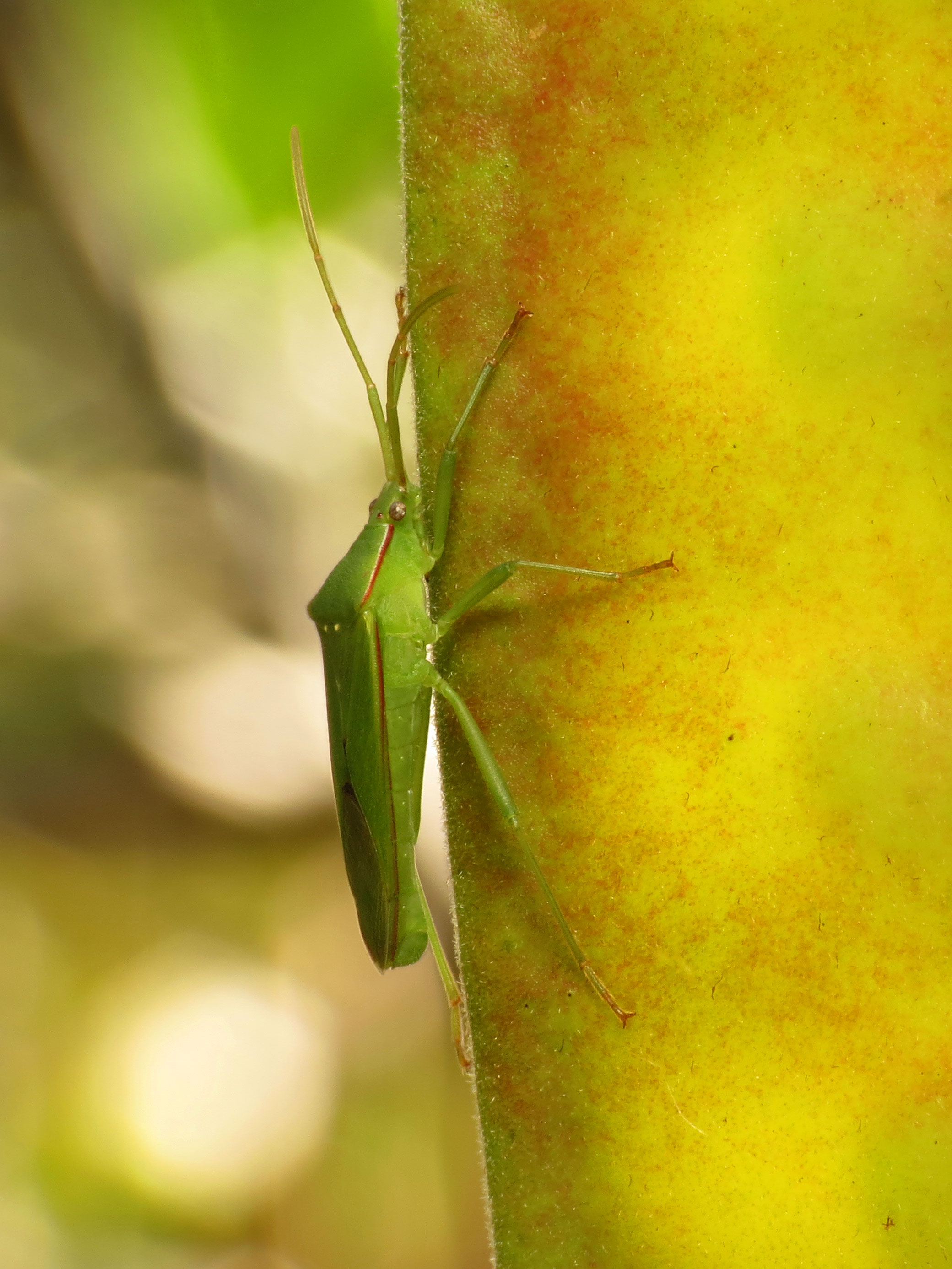
Savius rufomarginatus

== Genera ==
These eight genera belong to the tribe Discogastrini:

- Cnemomis Stål, 1860
- Coryzoplatus Spinola, 1837
- Discogaster Burmeister, 1835
- Karnaviexallis Brailovsky, 1984
- Lupanthus Stål, 1860
- Savius Stål, 1862
- Scamurius Stål, 1860
- Schuhgaster Brailovsky, 1993
