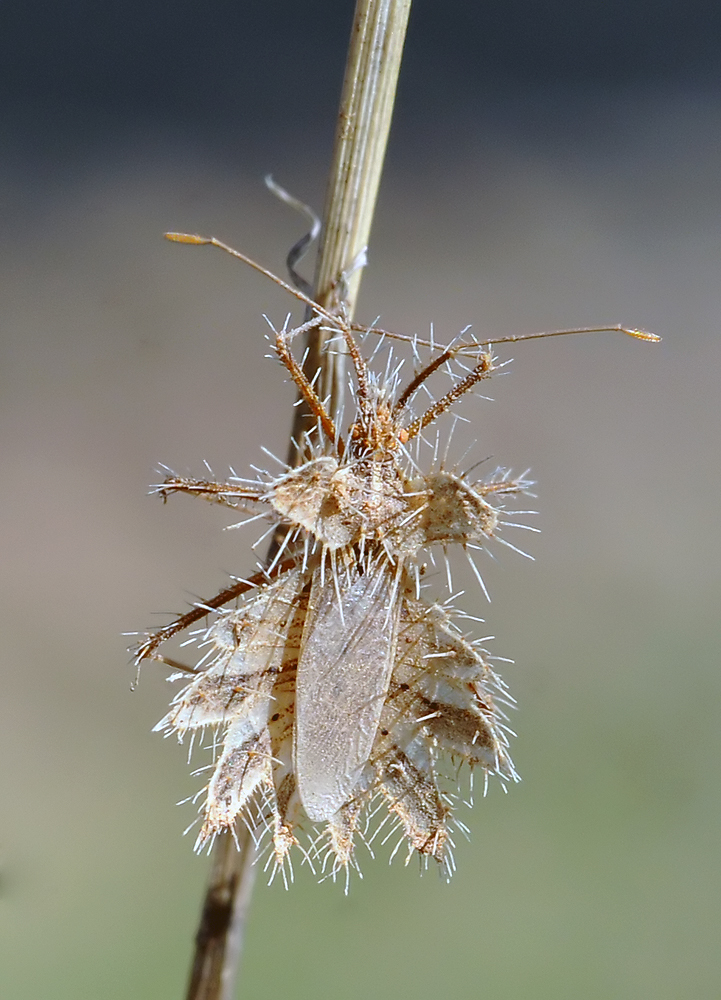
- Phyllomorpha lacerata

Scientific classification
- Domain: Eukaryota
- Kingdom: Animalia
- Phylum: Arthropoda
- Class: Insecta
- Order: Hemiptera
- Suborder: Heteroptera
- Family: Coreidae
- Genus: Phyllomorpha; Laporte, 1833

Synonyms
- Phyllomorphus Laporte, 1833; Craspedum Rambur, 1839; Phyllophya Stål, 1873; Paranotocoris Ahmad & Shadab, 1973; Paranotocornis Ahmad & Shadab, 1973

= Phyllomorpha =

Genus of true bugs

Phyllomorpha is a genus of mostly European coreid bugs, sometimes referred-to as golden egg bugs.

== Species ==
The Coreoidea Species File lists:

1. Phyllomorpha lacerata Herrich-Schäffer, 1835
2. Phyllomorpha laciniata (Villers, 1789) - type species (as Coreus hystrix Latreille)
