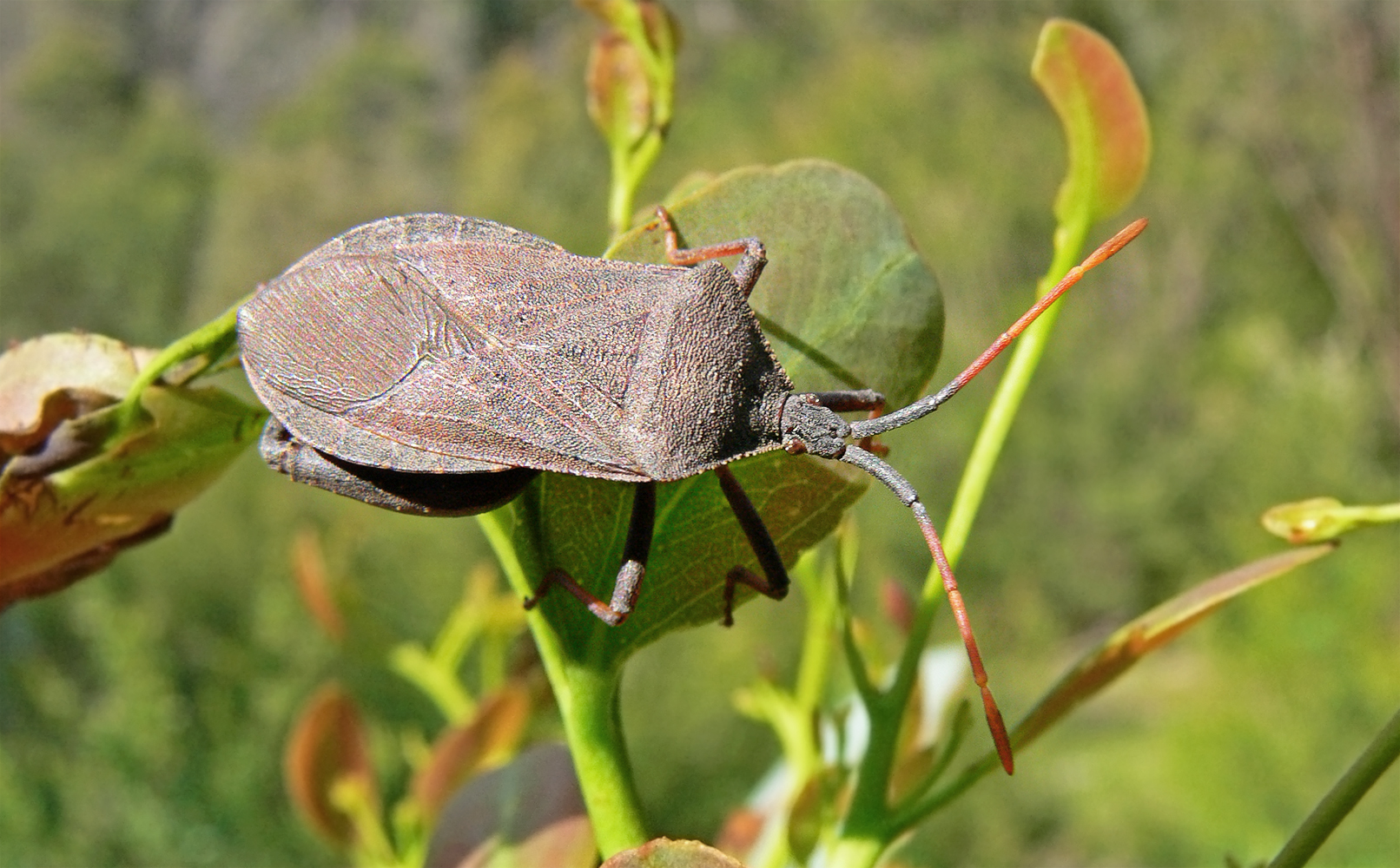
- Male Amorbus rubiginosus (Amorbini)

Scientific classification
- Kingdom: Animalia
- Phylum: Arthropoda
- Class: Insecta
- Order: Hemiptera
- Suborder: Heteroptera
- Family: Coreidae
- Subfamily: Coreinae; Leach, 1815

Tribes
- See text

= Coreinae =

Coreinae Temporal range: Cenomanian–Recent

Subfamily of true bugs

Coreinae is a subfamily in the hemipteran family Coreidae. They have been shown to be paraphyletic with respect to Meropachyinae.

== Tribes ==
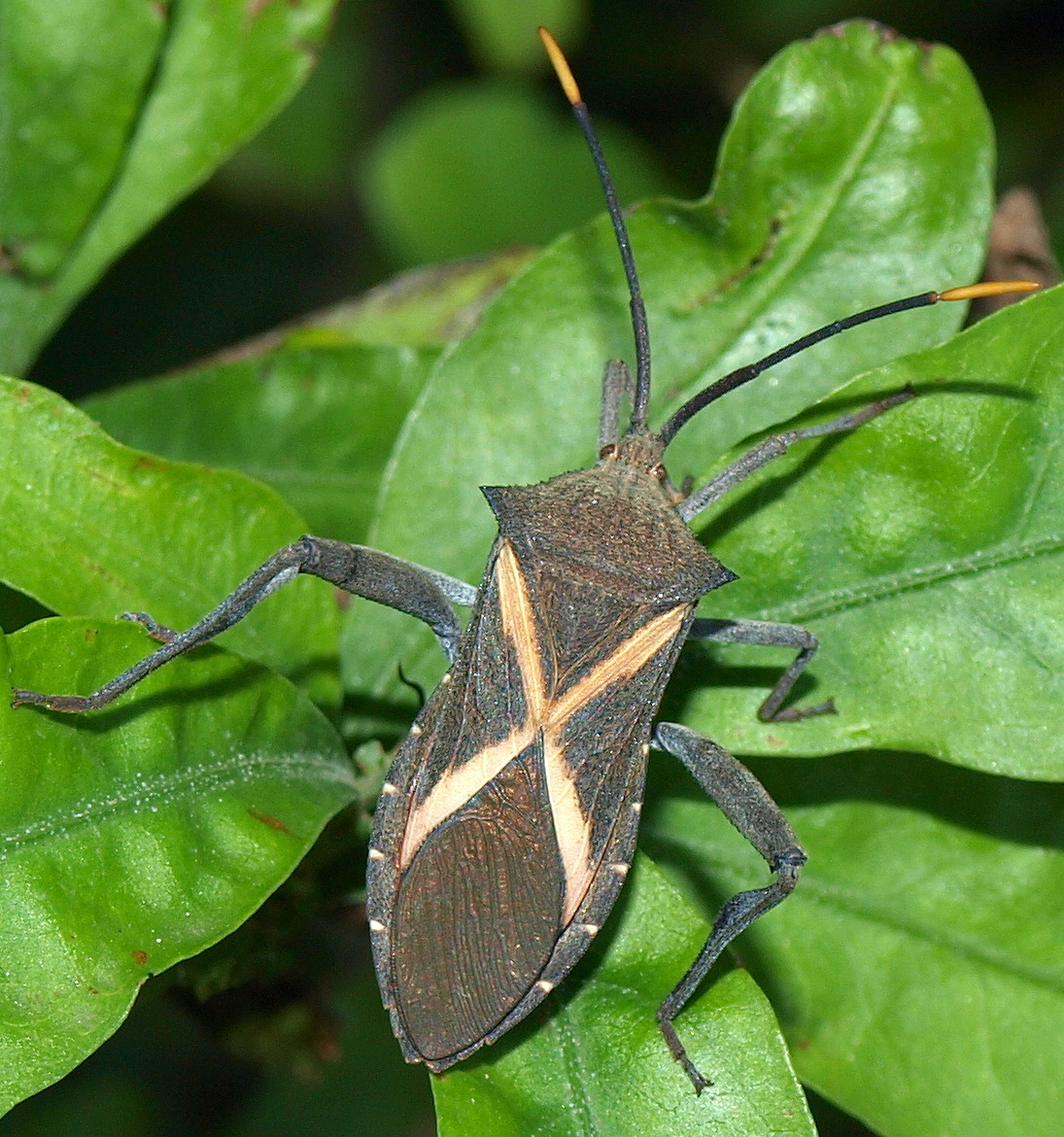
Mictis profana (Mictini)

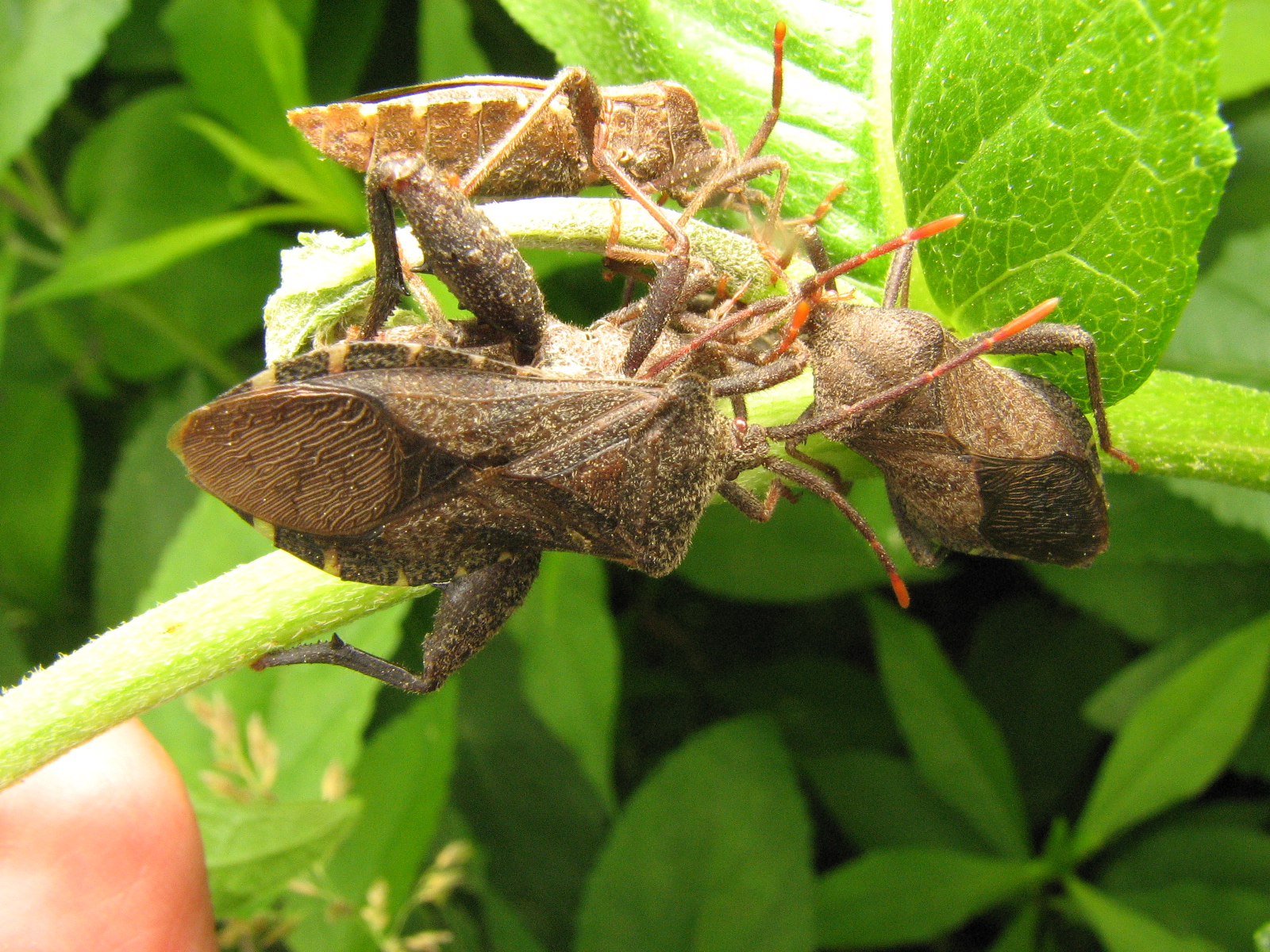
Piezogaster sp. mating group (Nematopodini)

The following tribes belong to the Coreinae:

1. Acanthocephalini Stål, 1870 - Americas
2. Acanthocerini Bergroth, 1913 - Americas
3. Acanthocorini Amyot and Serville, 1843 - Africa, Asia, Australia
4. Agriopocorini Miller, 1954 - Australia
5. Amorbini Stål, 1873 - Australia, New Guinea
6. Anhomoeini Hsiao, 1964 - Asian mainland:
  1. monotypic tribe: Anhomoeus Hsiao, 1963
7. Anisoscelini Laporte, 1832 - Americas, Africa, Europe, Asia
8. Barreratalpini Brailovsky, 1988 - Central America:
  1. monotypic tribe: Barreratalpa Brailovsky, 1988
9. Chariesterini Stål, 1868 - mostly Americas
10. Chelinideini Blatchley, 1926
  1. monotypic tribe: Chelinidea Uhler, 1863
11. Cloresmini Stål, 1873 - SE Asia
12. Colpurini Breddin, 1900 - Africa, Asia
13. Coreini Leach, 1815 - Africa, Europe, Asia
14. Cyllarini Stål, 1873 - tropical Africa, Sri Lanka
15. Daladerini Stål, 1873 - Africa, Asia
16. Dasynini Bergroth, 1913 - Africa, Asia, Australia
17. Discogastrini Stål, 1868 - central and S. America
18. Gonocerini (synonym Gonocérates Mulsant & Rey, 1870) - Africa, Europe, Asia, Australia
19. Homoeocerini Amyot and Serville, 1843 - Africa, Asia
20. Hypselonotini Bergroth, 1913 - Americas
21. Latimbini Stål, 1873 - Africa
22. Manocoreini Hsiao, 1964 - China, monogeneric:
  1. Manocoreus Hsiao, 1964
23. Mecocnemini Hsiao, 1964 - China, monogeneric:
  1. Mecocnemis Hsiao, 1964
24. Mictini Amyot and Serville, 1843 - Africa, Asia
25. Nematopodini Amyot and Serville, 1843 - Americas
26. Petascelini Stål, 1873 - Africa, Asia
27. Phyllomorphini Mulsant and Rey, 1870 - Africa, mainland Europe, Asia
  1. Pephricus Amyot & Serville, 1843
  2. Phyllomorpha Laporte, 1833
  3. Tongorma Kirkaldy, 1900
28. Placoscelini Stål, 1868 - central and S. America
29. Prionotylini Puton, 1872 - Europe, monogeneric:
  1. Prionotylus Fieber, 1860
30. Procamptini Ahmad, 1964 - Philippines, monogeneric:
  1. Procamptus Bergroth, 1925
31. Sinotagini Hsiao, 1963 - China, monogeneric:
  1. Sinotagus Kiritshenko, 1916
32. Spartocerini Amyot and Serville, 1843 - Americas

== Fossil genera ==
- Ferriantenna Cumming & Le Tirant, 2021 Burmese amber, Myanmar, Cenomanian
- Magnusantenna Du & Chen in Du et al. 2021 Burmese amber, Myanmar, Cenomanian
