= One-size-fits-all hypothesis (insect genitalia) =

The one-size-fits-all hypothesis of spider and insect male genitalia was proposed by William G. Eberhard et al. in 1998. It asserts that male genitalia will not vary significantly in size, even if the body size of the animal itself or another body part does vary significantly in size. This means that a large individual of a certain species will have roughly the same size genitalia as that of a small individual of the same species, according to the hypothesis. This is beneficial because if the structure of the female genital opening requires a specific size and shape for a successful mating, then males with medium-sized genitalia will successfully mate more on average, causing selection pressure. This specific type of selection pressure is called cryptic sexual selection. To measure its effects, one needs to study the allometry of the animal. If the allometry is negative, it indicates that the hypothesis is correct.

The hypothesis was challenged by Andy J. Green one year after Eberhard et al. published their article. He wrote in the same journal that their conclusions were incorrect and caused by a biased statistical methodology. Eberhard and his co-authors replied to this and refuted Green's claims. The one-size-fits-all hypothesis has been continualy revisited by multiple authors since its proposal in 1998, and as of 2025, there is seemingly good support for the hypothesis.
