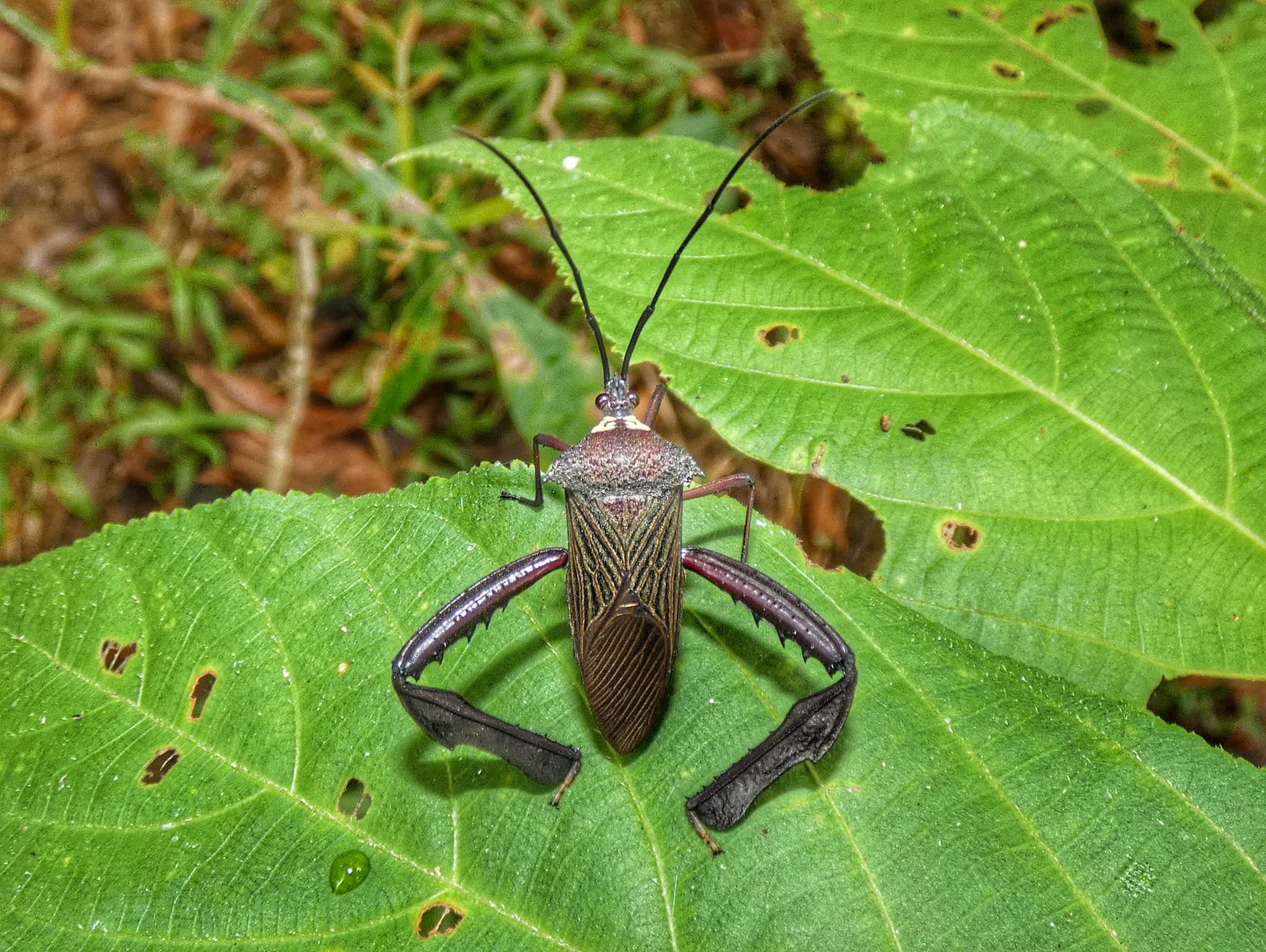

Scientific classification
- Kingdom: Animalia
- Phylum: Arthropoda
- Class: Insecta
- Order: Hemiptera
- Suborder: Heteroptera
- Family: Coreidae
- Tribe: Acanthocephalini
- Genus: Acanthocephala
- Species: A. latipes

Binomial name
- Acanthocephala latipes Drury, 1782

= Acanthocephala latipes =

Species of insect

Acanthocephala latipes is a species of leaf-footed bug in the family Coreidae. It is found in Central and South America.
