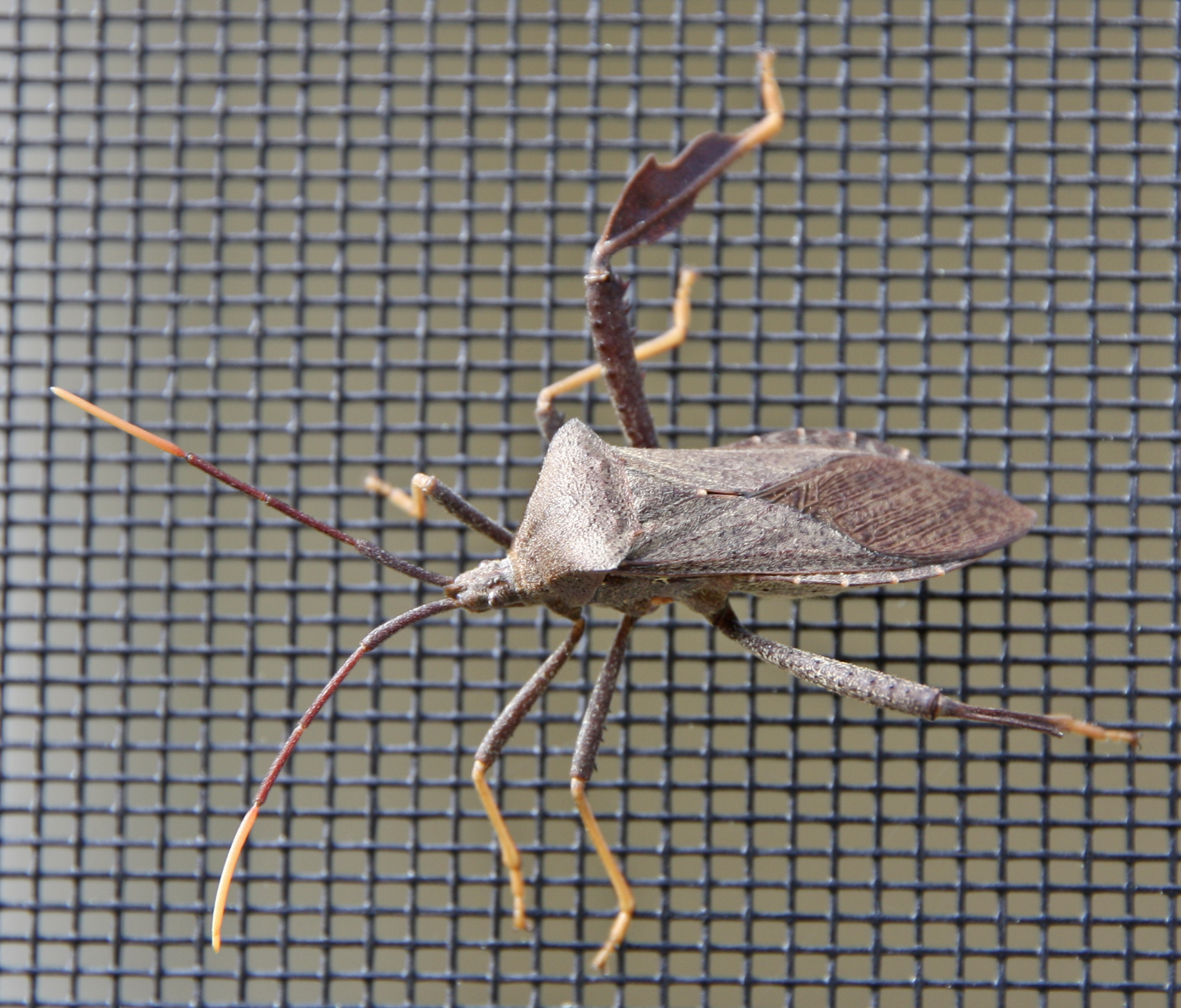

Scientific classification
- Kingdom: Animalia
- Phylum: Arthropoda
- Class: Insecta
- Order: Hemiptera
- Suborder: Heteroptera
- Family: Coreidae
- Tribe: Acanthocephalini
- Genus: Acanthocephala
- Species: A. femorata

Binomial name
- Acanthocephala femorata (Fabricius, 1775)

Synonyms
- Acanthocephala bispinus (Westwood, 1842); Acanthocephala granulosus (Dallas, 1852); Acanthocephala luctuosus (Stål, 1855); Acanthocephala nasulus (Say, 1832); Acanthocephala obscurus (Westwood, 1842)

= Florida leaf-footed bug =

Species of true bug

The Florida leaf-footed bug (Acanthocephala femorata) is a species of insect. The genus name Acanthocephala means "spiny head" and comes from the pointed tylus at the tip of the head. Acanthocephala femorata is found in the continental United States and Mexico.

This insect is considered a pest, eating and causing damage to citrus and roses. The lower rear legs are wider than the upper legs, with serrations. This is especially pronounced in the male. It has long, slim, curving antennae with distinctive orange tips. The body is reddish brown to nearly black.

They have a number of predators and therefore biological control is generally enough to prevent their populations from going out of control. Many do not make it past the larval stage; parasitic flies often lay their eggs within the developing larvae, paralyzing them. They are also eaten by birds and assassin bugs.
