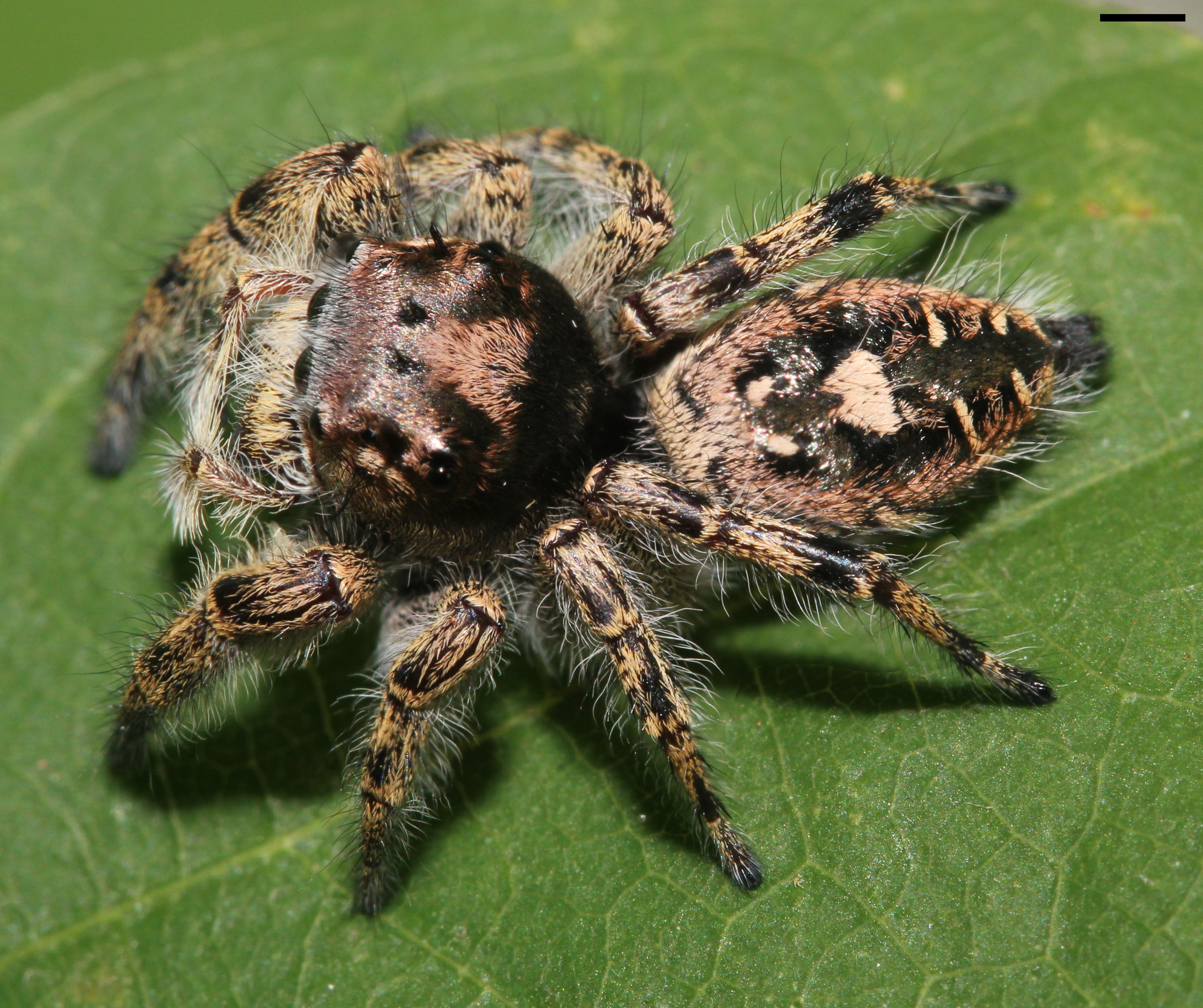
- Female
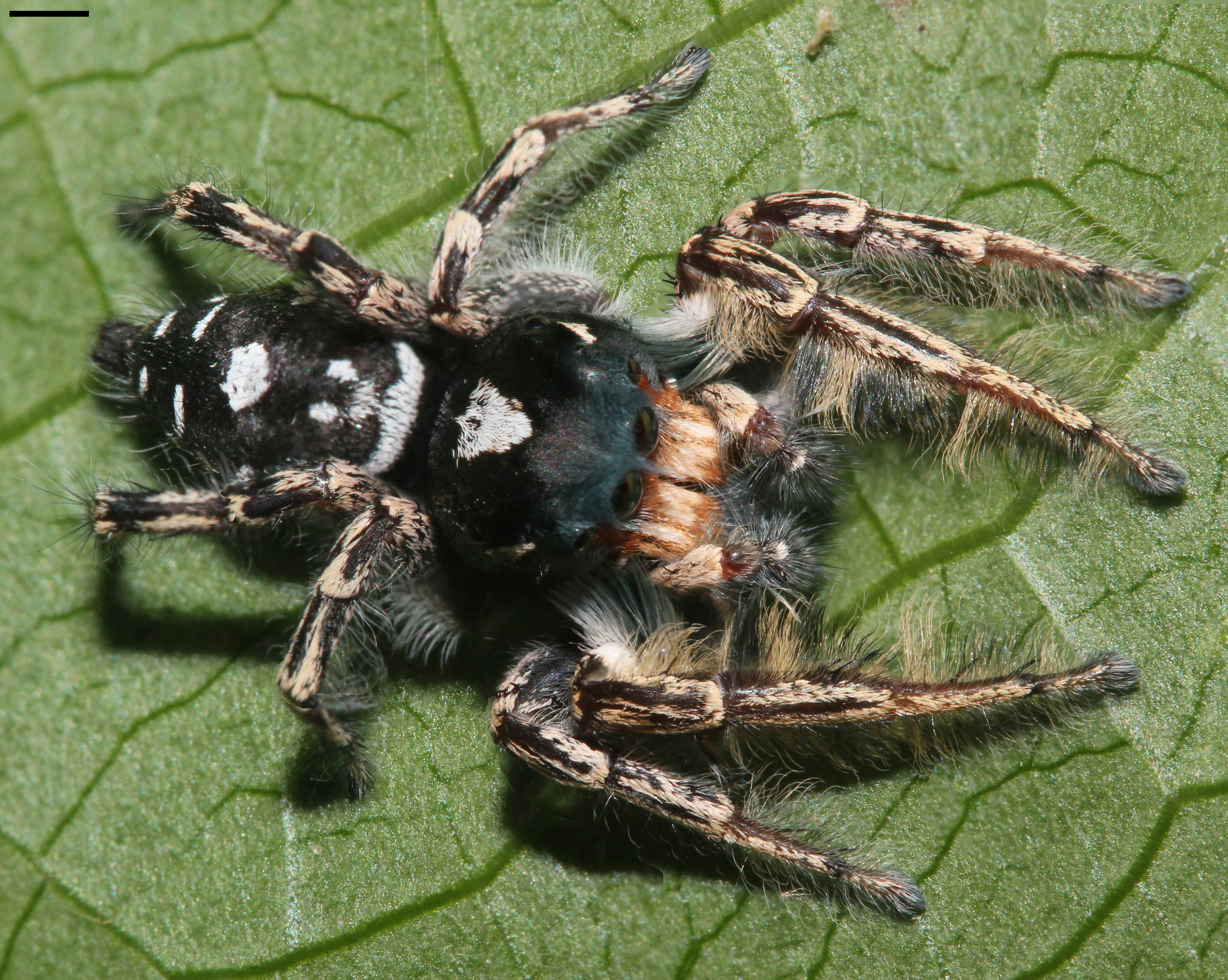
- Male

Scientific classification
- Kingdom: Animalia
- Phylum: Arthropoda
- Subphylum: Chelicerata
- Class: Arachnida
- Order: Araneae
- Infraorder: Araneomorphae
- Family: Salticidae
- Genus: Phidippus
- Species: P. putnami

Binomial name
- Phidippus putnami (Peckham & Peckham, 1883)

= Phidippus putnami =

Species of spider

Phidippus putnami is a species of jumping spider found in the United States.

== Gallery ==
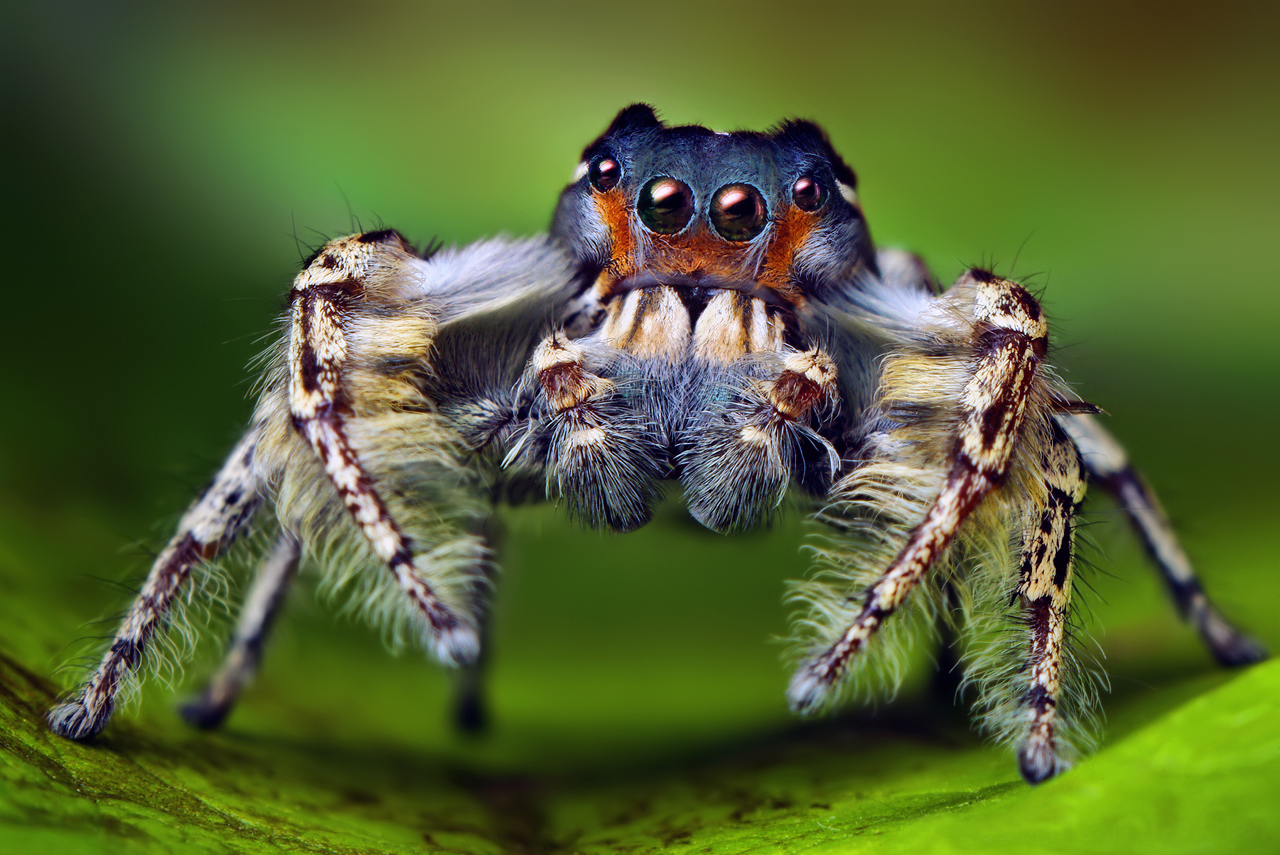
An adult male Phidippus putnami

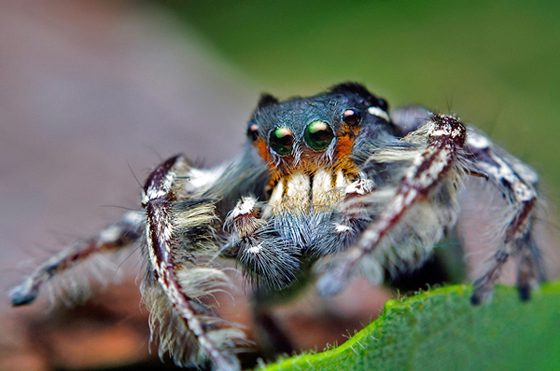
Another view of the same specimen

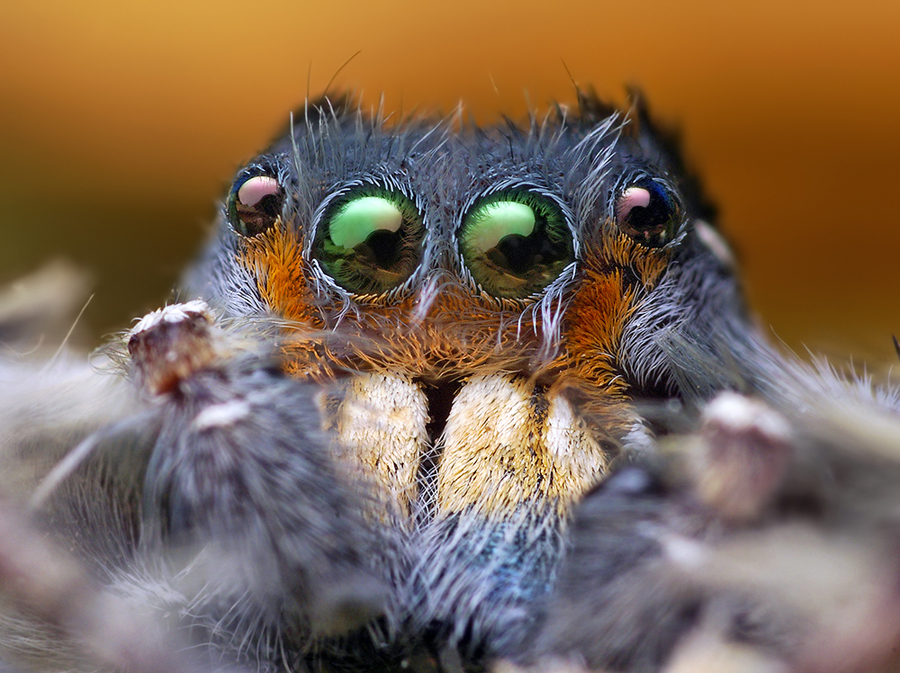
Detail showing eyes and facial coloration

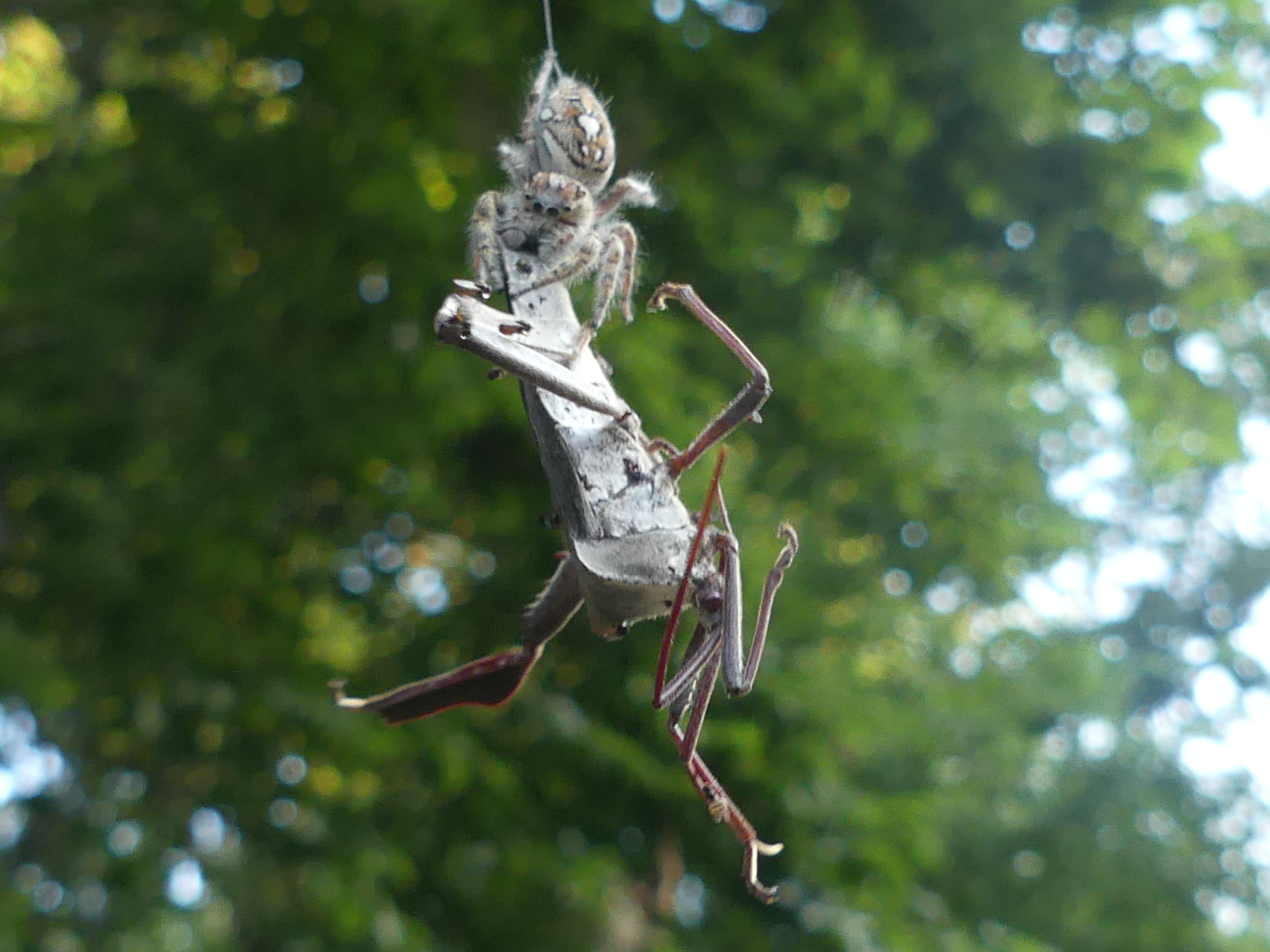
Female eating a giant leaf-footed bug
