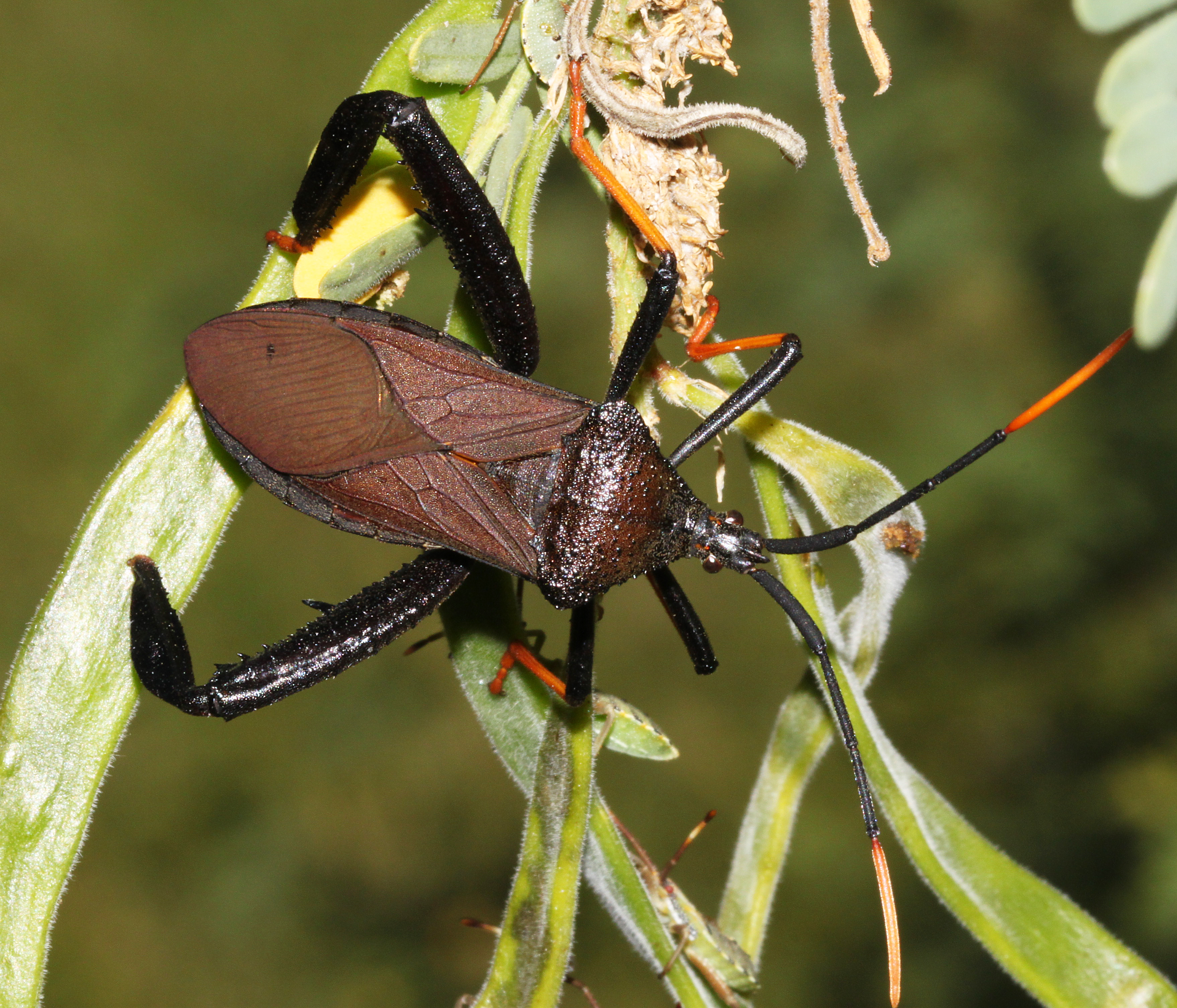

Scientific classification
- Kingdom: Animalia
- Phylum: Arthropoda
- Class: Insecta
- Order: Hemiptera
- Suborder: Heteroptera
- Family: Coreidae
- Tribe: Acanthocephalini
- Genus: Acanthocephala
- Species: A. thomasi

Binomial name
- Acanthocephala thomasi (Uhler, 1872)

= Acanthocephala thomasi =

Species of true bug

Acanthocephala thomasi, the giant agave bug, is a species of leaf-footed bug in the family Coreidae. It is found in Central America and North America.

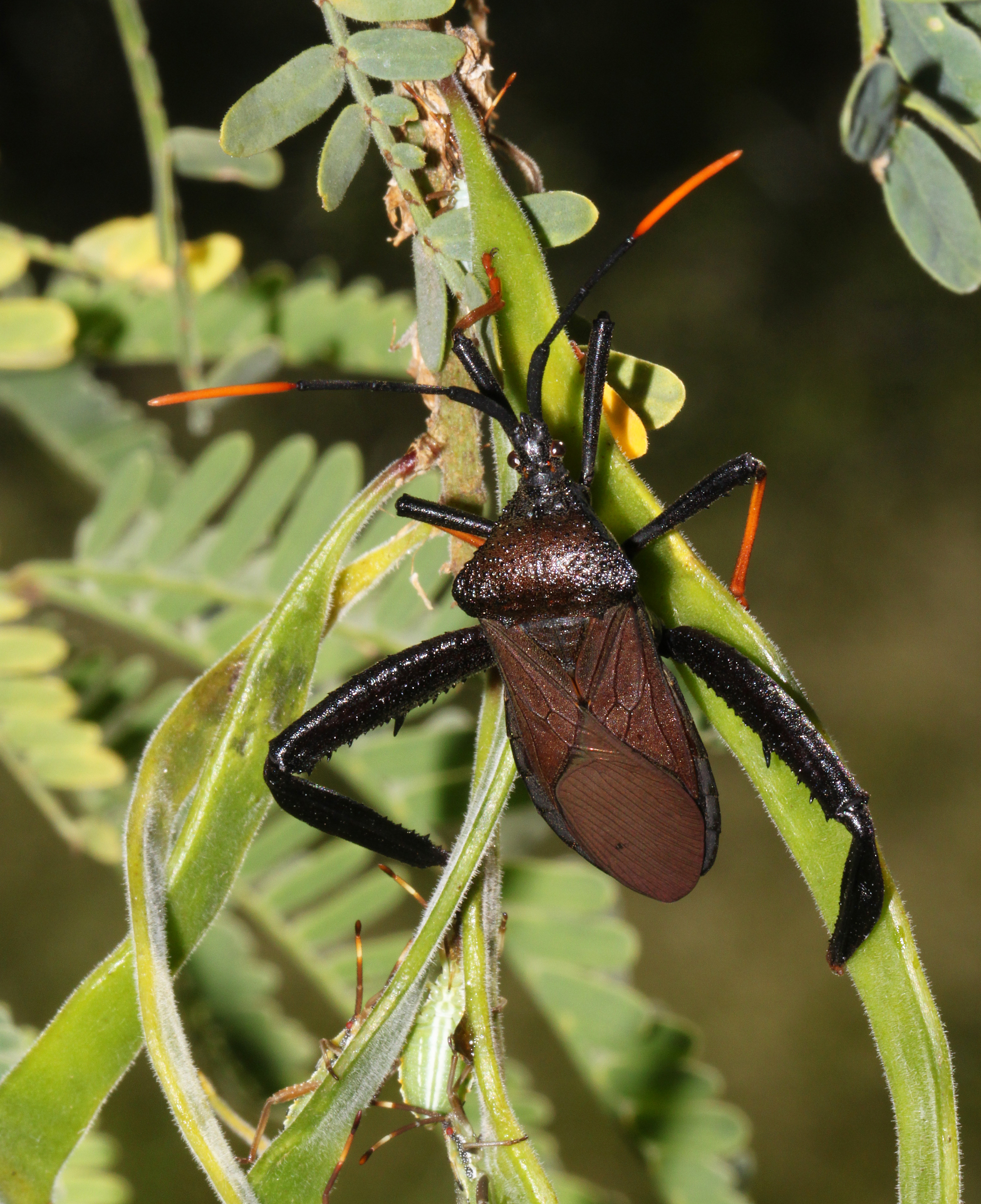
Giant agave bug, Acanthocephala thomasi
