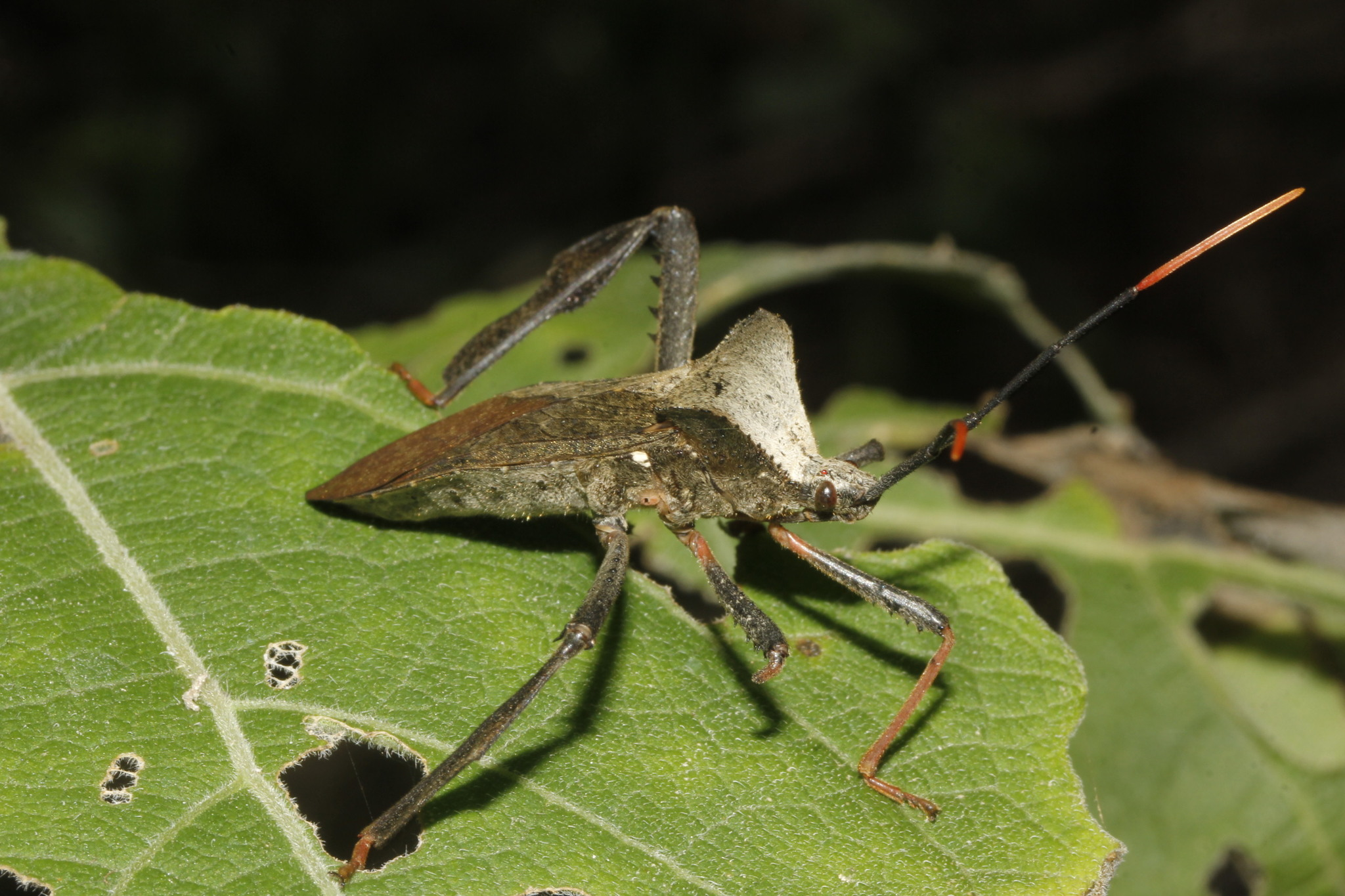

Scientific classification
- Kingdom: Animalia
- Phylum: Arthropoda
- Class: Insecta
- Order: Hemiptera
- Suborder: Heteroptera
- Family: Coreidae
- Tribe: Acanthocephalini
- Genus: Acanthocephala
- Species: A. alata

Binomial name
- Acanthocephala alata (Burmeister, 1835)

= Acanthocephala alata =

Species of true bug

Acanthocephala alata is a species of leaf-footed bug in the family Coreidae. It is native to Mexico and can be found from Texas to Colombia.
