= Acanthocephala (disambiguation) =

Acanthocephala may refer to:

- Acanthocephala, a phylum of parasitic platyzoan "worms"
- Acanthocephala (bug), a genus of Coreidae (leaf-footed bugs)
- A former cactus genus now a junior synonym of Parodia
