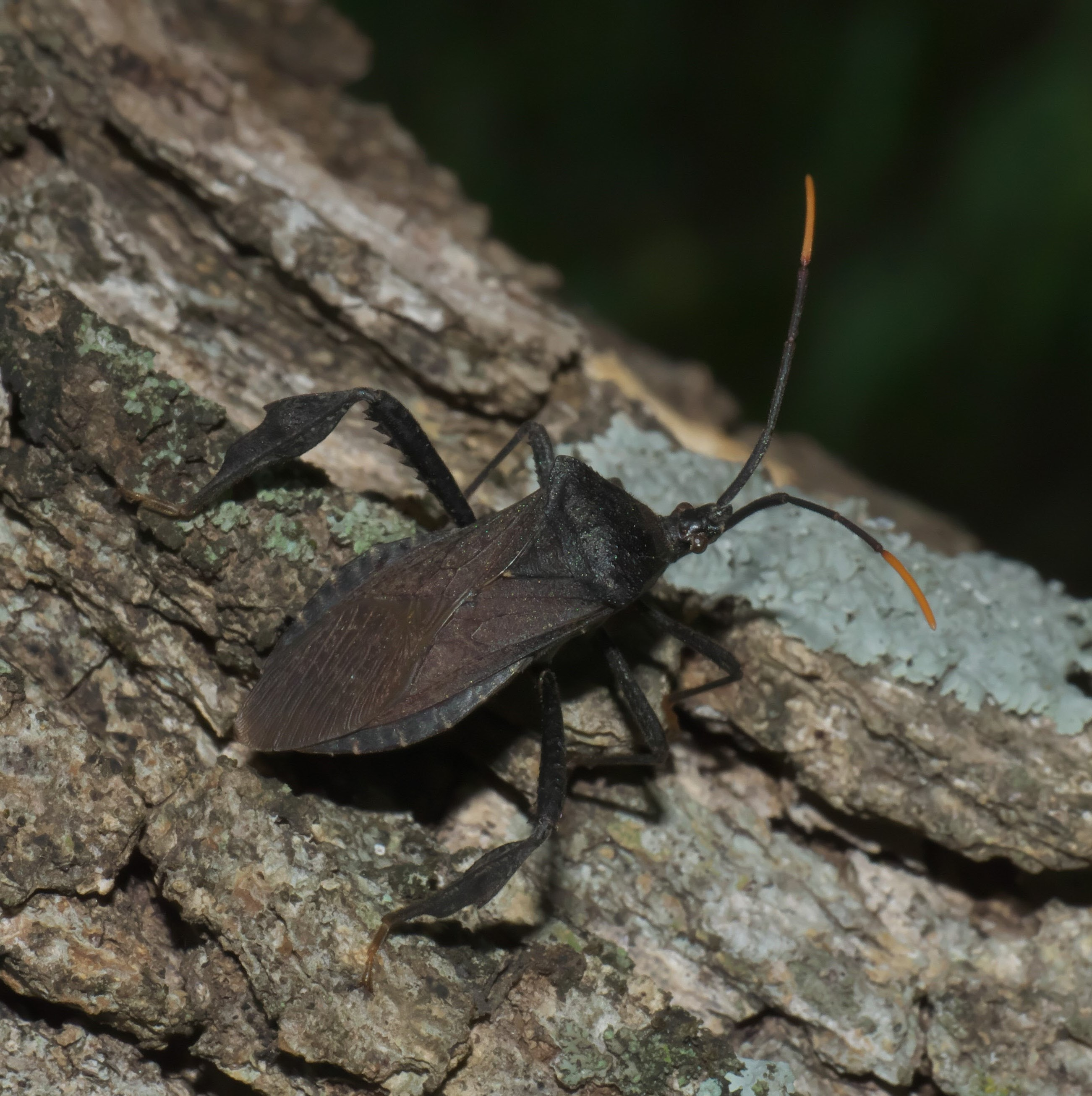

Scientific classification
- Kingdom: Animalia
- Phylum: Arthropoda
- Clade: Pancrustacea
- Class: Insecta
- Order: Hemiptera
- Suborder: Heteroptera
- Family: Coreidae
- Tribe: Acanthocephalini
- Genus: Acanthocephala
- Species: A. terminalis

Binomial name
- Acanthocephala terminalis (Dallas, 1852)

Synonyms
- Metapodius terminalis Dallas, 1852; Anisoscelis prominulus Rathvon, 1869; Acanthocephala (Metapodius) terminalis Stål, 1870; Metapodius confraternus Uhler, 1871; Metapodius instabilis Uhler, 1871

= Acanthocephala terminalis =

Species of true bug

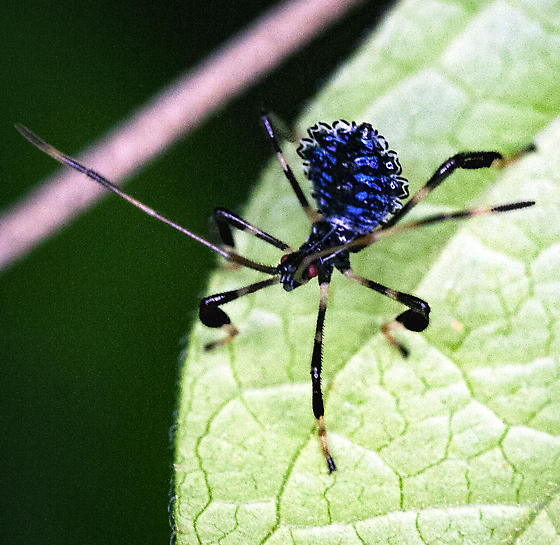
Acanthocephala terminalis nymph

Acanthocephala terminalis is a species of leaf-footed bug in the family Coreidae. It is found in the eastern half of the United States and eastern Mexico. It is harmless to humans and pets and does not bite or sting and there is no evidence that it carries parasites or human diseases; however, it may release a foul odor if threatened or squashed.

Acanthocephala terminalis on milkweed

Two leaf-footed bugs interact.

== Description ==
Acanthocephala terminalis is usually around 18–25 millimetres (0.71–0.98 in) long with a dark gray to black color. The fourth (and last) segment of their antennae have orange coloration, and the tibia of their hind legs have a flat, leaf-like appearance. Sexual dimorphism is relatively limited. The hind femora and shape of the expanded hind tibia may differ slightly in shape, while body size remains relatively constant.

== Range and habitat ==
Acanthocephala terminalis is usually found in the eastern half of the United States and parts of southeast Canada. They will usually live in woodlands, fields, and meadows.

== Ecology and life cycle ==
Acanthocephala terminalis will begin its mating period in late spring, and females will lay eggs on host plants. Once the juveniles hatch they will molt five times before they reach adulthood. With each molt the nymphs will slightly more resemble the adults. Acanthocephala terminalis overwinters as an adult. Both juveniles and adults produce defensive scent from their thorax as a repellant. Food plants include staghorn sumac, riverbank grape, and ninebark.
