= Insect reproduction =

Male insects produce sperm, which is delivered to the female via the Aedeagus. Although in some insects, such as Bed bugs, the male can inject his sperm directly into the abdomen through the cuticle of the female, a process known as traumatic insemination.

With the exception of parthenogenetic insects, insects are most often sexually dimorphic, with the males and females of most insects differing in appearance.

Insects have several strategies for locating mates, including the use of sex pheromones, mass swarming (lekking, as in honey bee nuptial swarming), and nuptial gifts.

== Life-cycles ==
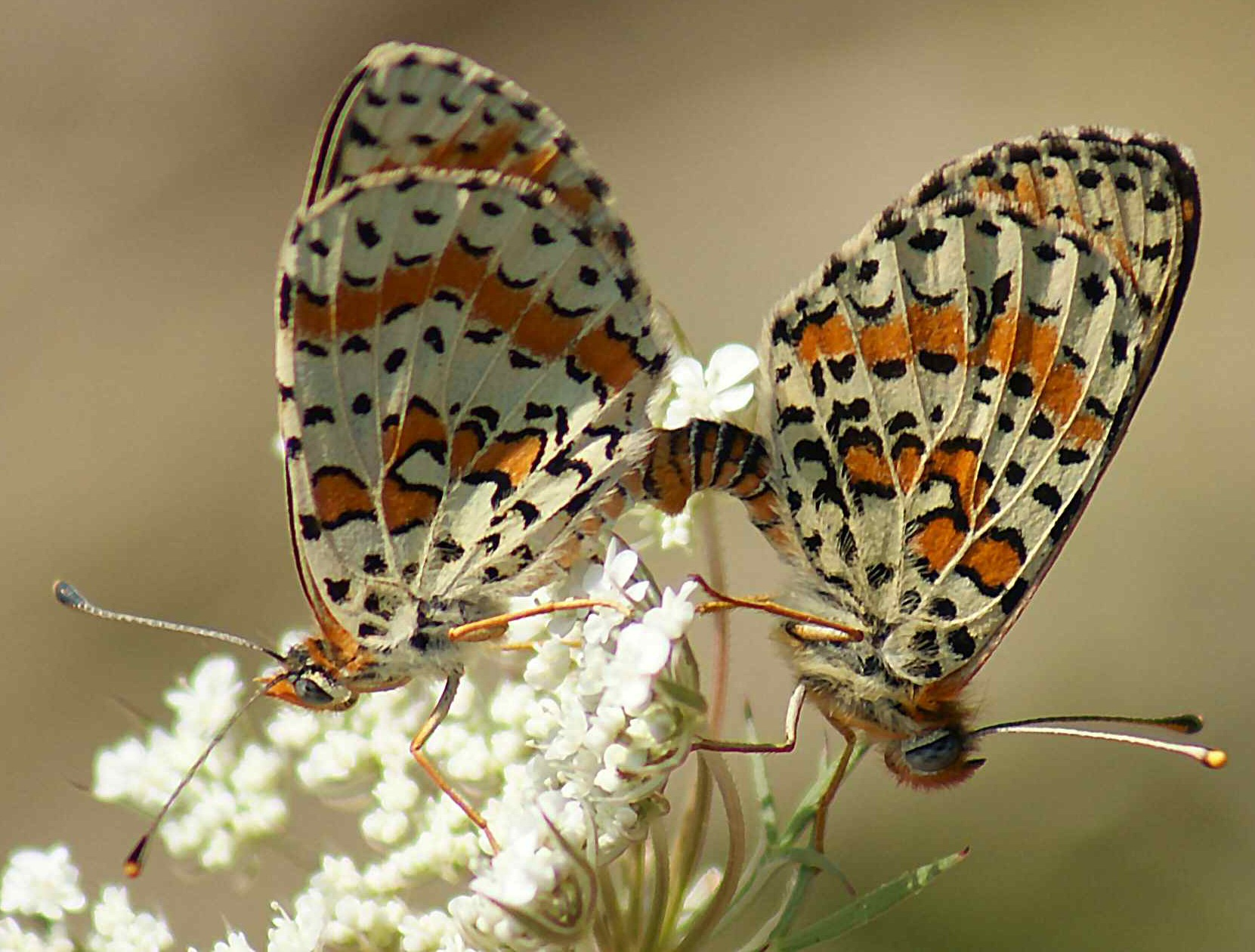
Butterflies mating

The majority of insects hatch from eggs. The fertilization and development takes place inside the egg, enclosed by a shell (chorion) that consists of maternal tissue. In contrast to eggs of other arthropods, most insect eggs are drought resistant. This is because inside the chorion two additional membranes develop from embryonic tissue, the amnion and the serosa. This serosa secretes a cuticle rich in chitin that protects the embryo against desiccation. Many insects lay their eggs in large masses, while others favour greater dispersion and lay single eggs in different locations. Herbivorous insects may lay their eggs in discreet locations on plants, such as the underside of a leaf.

Some species of insects, like aphids and tsetse flies, are ovoviviparous: their eggs develop entirely inside the female, and then hatch immediately upon being laid. Some other species, such as in the cockroach genus Diploptera, are viviparous, gestating inside the mother and born alive. Many insect species, such as Vine weevils, some stick insects, and, most notably, aphids, are parthenogenetic, meaning they do not require males to fertilize their eggs. Some insects, like parasitoid wasps, are polyembryonic, meaning that a single fertilized egg divides into many separate embryos. Insects may be univoltine, bivoltine or multivoltine, having one, two or many broods in a year.

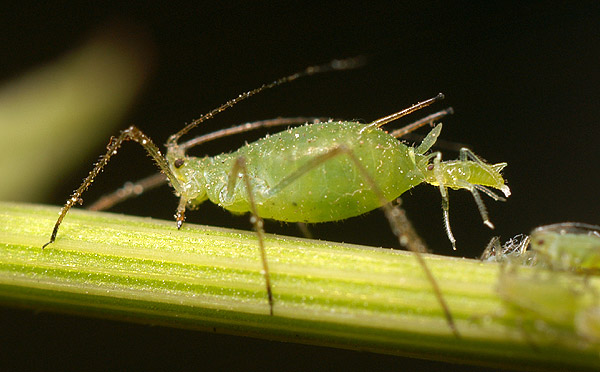
Aphid giving birth to live female young by parthenogenesis from unfertilized eggs

A female leaf-footed bug deposits an egg before flying off.

Other developmental and reproductive variations include haplodiploidy, polymorphism, paedomorphosis or peramorphosis, sexual dimorphism, parthenogenesis, and more rarely hermaphroditism. In haplodiploidy, which is a type of sex-determination system, the offspring's sex is determined by the number of sets of chromosomes an individual receives. This system is typical in bees and wasps.

Some insects are parthenogenetic, meaning that the female can reproduce and give birth without having the eggs fertilized by a male. Many aphids undergo a cyclical form of parthenogenesis in which they alternate between one or many generations of asexual and sexual reproduction. In summer, aphids are generally female and parthenogenetic; in the autumn, males may be produced for sexual reproduction. Other insects produced by parthenogenesis are bees, wasps and ants; in their haplodiploid system, diploid females spawn many females and a few haploid males.

== Metamorphosis ==
Metamorphosis in insects is the process of development that converts young to adults. There are two forms of metamorphosis: incomplete and complete.

=== Incomplete ===
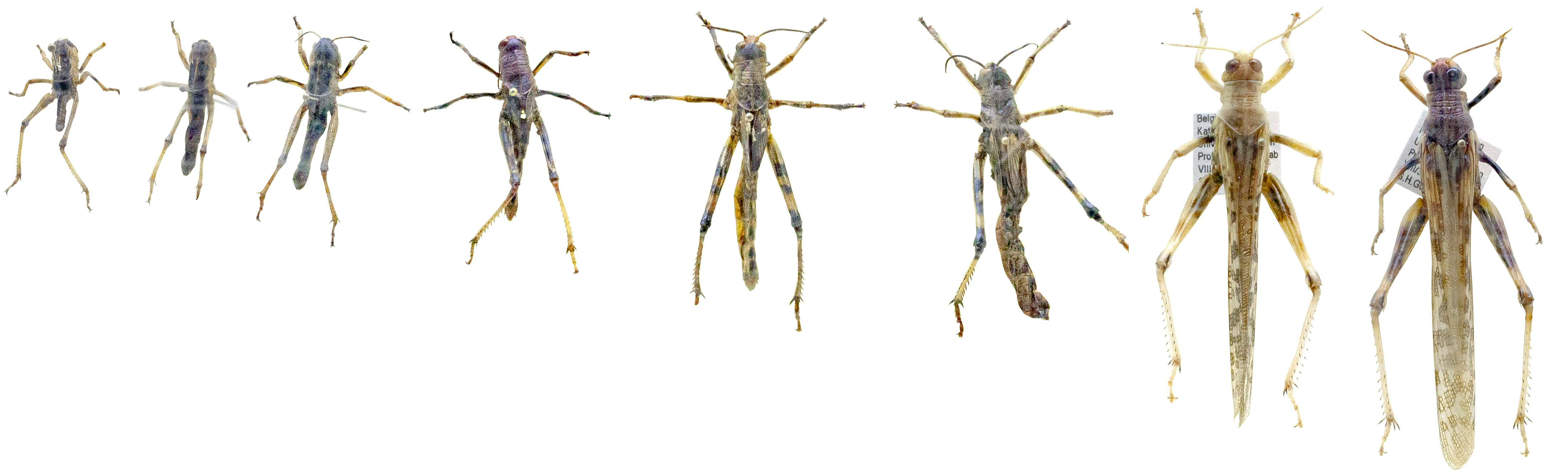
Incomplete metamorphosis in a locust with multiple instars. Egg is not shown. The largest specimen is adult.

Hemimetabolous insects, those with incomplete metamorphosis, change gradually after hatching from the egg by undergoing a series of molts through stages called instars, until the final, adult, stage is reached. An insect molts when it outgrows its exoskeleton, which does not stretch and would otherwise restrict the insect's growth. The molting process begins as the insect's epidermis secretes a new epicuticle inside the old one. After this new epicuticle is secreted, the epidermis releases a mixture of enzymes that digests the endocuticle and thus detaches the old cuticle. When this stage is complete, the insect makes its body swell by taking in a large quantity of water or air; this makes the old cuticle split along predefined weaknesses where it was thinnest.

=== Complete ===
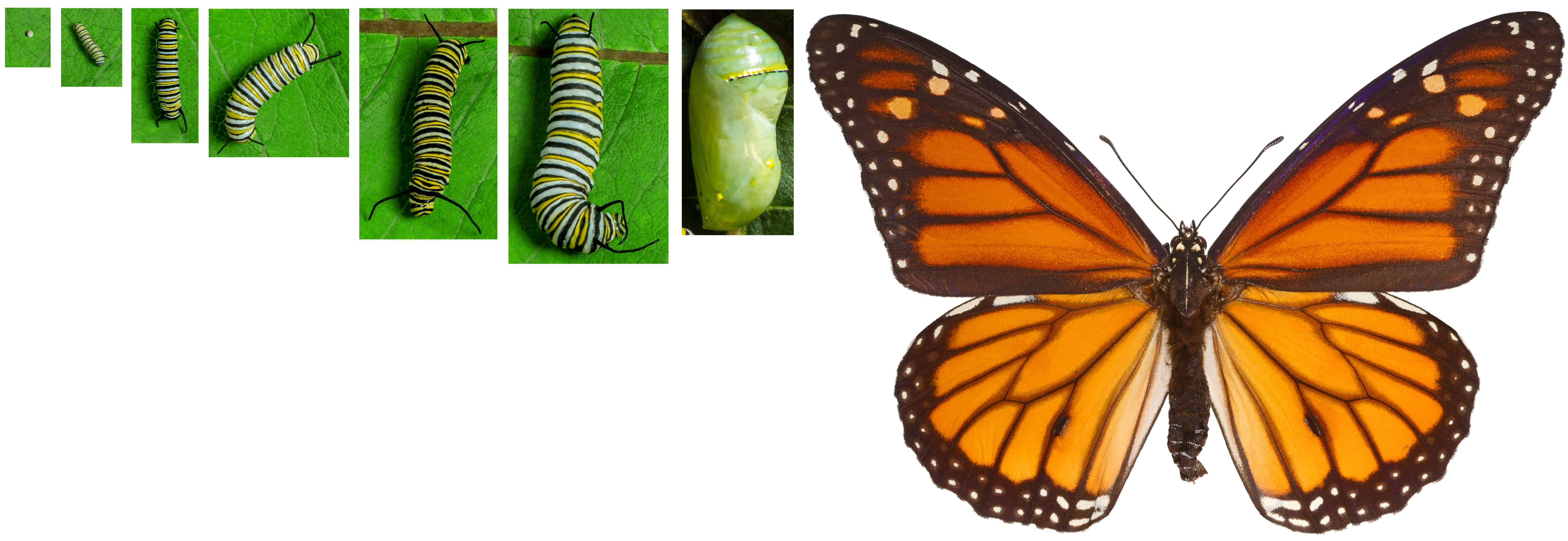
Life-cycle of butterfly, undergoing complete metamorphosis from egg through caterpillar larvae to pupa and adult

Holometabolism, or complete metamorphosis, is where the insect changes in four stages, an egg or embryo, a larva, a pupa and the adult or imago. In these species, an egg hatches to produce a larva, which is generally worm-like in form. This can be eruciform (caterpillar-like), scarabaeiform (grub-like), campodeiform (elongated, flattened and active), elateriform (wireworm-like) or vermiform (maggot-like). The larva grows and eventually becomes a pupa, a stage marked by reduced movement. There are three types of pupae: obtect, exarate or coarctate. Obtect pupae are compact, with the legs and other appendages enclosed. Exarate pupae have their legs and other appendages free and extended. Coarctate pupae develop inside the larval skin. Insects undergo considerable change in form during the pupal stage, and emerge as adults. Butterflies are well-known for undergoing complete metamorphosis; most insects use this life cycle. Some insects have evolved this system to hypermetamorphosis. Complete metamorphosis is a trait of the most diverse insect group, the Endopterygota.

== Sources ==
- Gullan, P. J.; Cranston, P. S. (2005). The Insects: An Outline of Entomology (3rd ed.). Oxford: Blackwell Publishing. ISBN 978-1-4051-1113-3.
