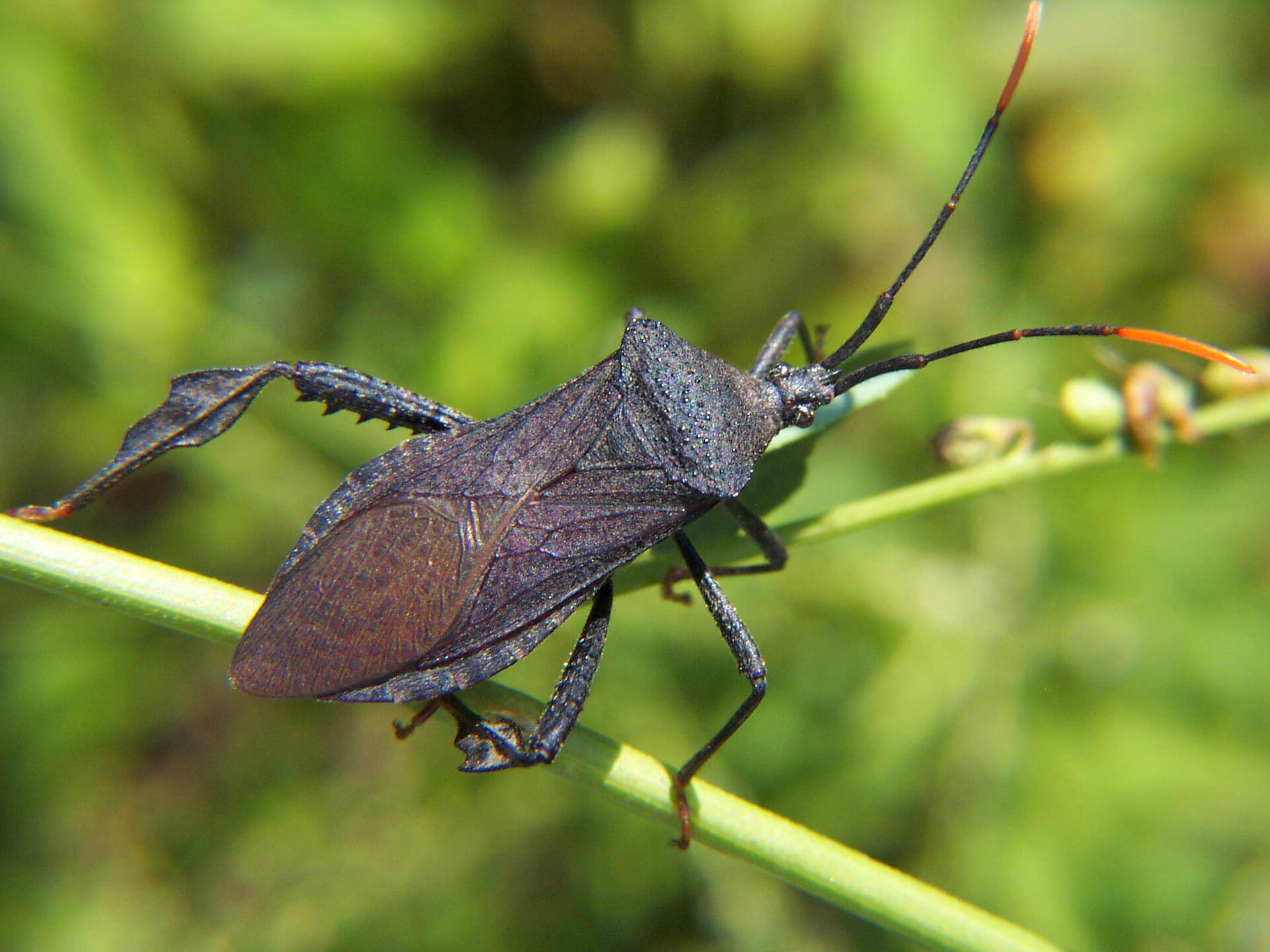
- Acanthocephala terminalis

Scientific classification
- Kingdom: Animalia
- Phylum: Arthropoda
- Clade: Pancrustacea
- Class: Insecta
- Order: Hemiptera
- Suborder: Heteroptera
- Family: Coreidae
- Subfamily: Coreinae
- Tribe: Acanthocephalini
- Genus: Acanthocephala; Laporte, 1833

Species
- 40 species; see text

= Acanthocephala (bug) =

Genus of true bugs

Acanthocephala, also known as spine-headed bugs, is a New World genus of true bugs in the family Coreidae. The scientific name is derived from the Greek ἄκανθα (akantha) meaning "thorn/spine" and κεφαλή (kephalé) meaning "head".

== Taxonomy and phylogeny ==
Acanthocephala is a member of the tribe Acanthocephalini and its most speciose genus. Stål divided the genus into three subgenera in 1870: A. (Acanthocephala), A. (Metapodius), and A. (Spilopleura). In 1902, A. (Metapodius) was replaced with A. (Metapodiessa) by Kirkaldy as the former was a homotypic synonym of A. (Acanthocephala). Packauskas synomymized the subgeneric names under Acanthocephala in his 2010 catalog. In 2023, Spilopleura was elevated as a separate genus by Olivera et al.. In 2026, Olivera, Melo, and Dellapé reinstated A. (Acanthocephala) and A. (Metapodiessa) as valid subgenera and established 3 new subgenera: A. (Contrastata), A. (Pronoptera), and A. (Spinipedia).

== Distribution ==
Acanthocephala species are found in North, Central, and South America.

== Species ==
There are 40 described species of Acanthocephala divided into 5 subgenera as follows:

=== Subgenus Acanthocephala (Acanthocephala) Laporte, 1833 ===
- A. carioca Olivera, Dellapé & Melo, 2024
- A. equalis (Westwood, 1842)
- A. flaviantennata Olivera, Dellapé & Melo, 2024
- A. gamboensis Olivera, Dellapé & Melo, 2024
- A. guatemalena Distant, 1881
- A. harryi Olivera, Dellapé & Melo, 2024
- A. latipes (Drury, 1782)
- A. nigra Olivera, Dellapé & Melo, 2024
- A. rufa Olivera, Dellapé & Melo, 2024
- A. pleuritica (Costa, 1863)
- A. scutellata (Signoret, 1862)
- A. spinosa Olivera, Dellapé & Melo, 2024

=== Subgenus Acanthocephala (Contrastata) Olivera, Melo & Dellapé, 2026 ===
- A. thomasi (Uhler, 1872)

=== Subgenus Acanthocephala (Metapodiessa) Kirkaldy, 1902 ===
- A. affinis (Walker, 1871)
- A. angusta Olivera, Dellapé & Melo, 2024
- A. angustipes (Westwood, 1842)
- A. apicalis (Westwood, 1842)
- A. bicoloripes (Stål, 1855)
- A. concolor (Herrich-Schäffer, 1841)
- A. consobrina (Westwood, 1842)
- A. dallasi (Lethierry & Severin, 1894)
- A. distanti Olivera, Dellapé & Melo, 2024
- A. femorata (Fabricius, 1775)
- A. granulosa (Dallas, 1852)
- A. latiantennata Olivera, Dellapé & Melo, 2024
- A. luctuosa (Stål, 1855)
- A. surata (Burmeister, 1835)
- A. terminalis (Dallas, 1852)
- A. unicolor (Westwood, 1842)

=== Subgenus Acanthocephala (Pronoptera) Olivera, Melo & Dellapé, 2026 ===
- A. alata (Burmeister, 1835)
- A. brunnea Olivera, Dellapé & Melo, 2024
- A. declivis (Say, 1832)
- A. macrotuberculata Olivera, Dellapé & Melo, 2024
- A. maculata Olivera, Dellapé & Melo, 2024
- A. mercur (Mayr, 1865)
- A. panamensis Distant, 1881
- A. pilosa Olivera, Dellapé & Melo, 2024
- A. pittieri (Montandon, 1895)
- A. thoracica (Dallas, 1852)

=== Subgenus Acanthocephala (Spinipedia) Olivera, Melo & Dellapé, 2026 ===
- A. heissi (Brailovsky, 2006)
