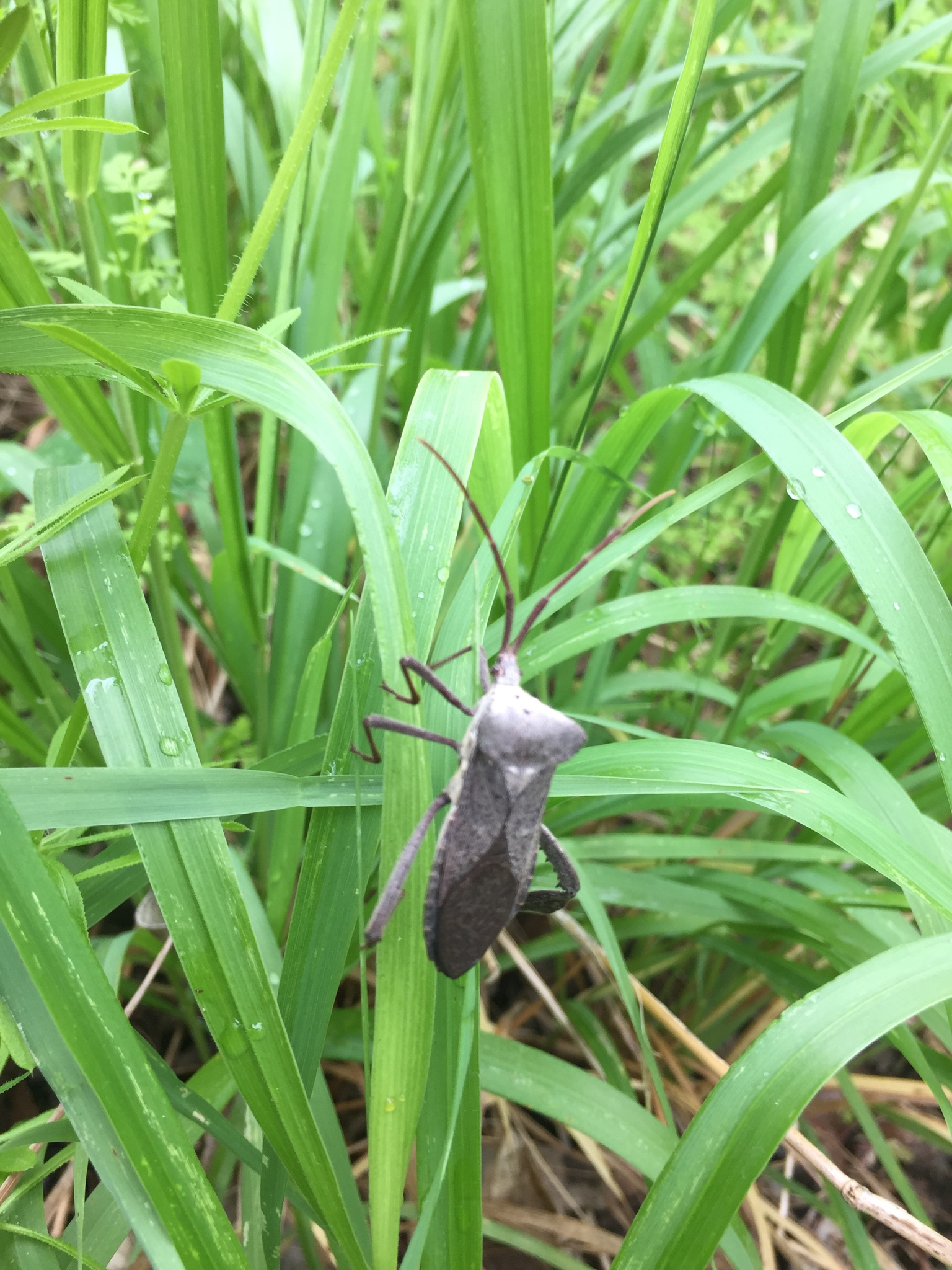

Scientific classification
- Kingdom: Animalia
- Phylum: Arthropoda
- Class: Insecta
- Order: Hemiptera
- Suborder: Heteroptera
- Family: Coreidae
- Genus: Acanthocephala
- Species: A. declivis

Binomial name
- Acanthocephala declivis (Say, 1832)

= Acanthocephala declivis =

Species of true bug

Acanthocephala declivis, the giant leaf-footed bug, is a species of North American true bug with a range from the southern United States to El Salvador and some Caribbean islands. It is the largest of this genus within this range, generally growing to be 28 to 34 mm (1.1 to 1.3 in) long. It can be distinguished from similar species by its much more broadly expanding pronotum, which extends much further than the abdomen, and the blunt tubercles on the midline of the anterior pronotal lobe, which is not present in other Acantla species within its range.

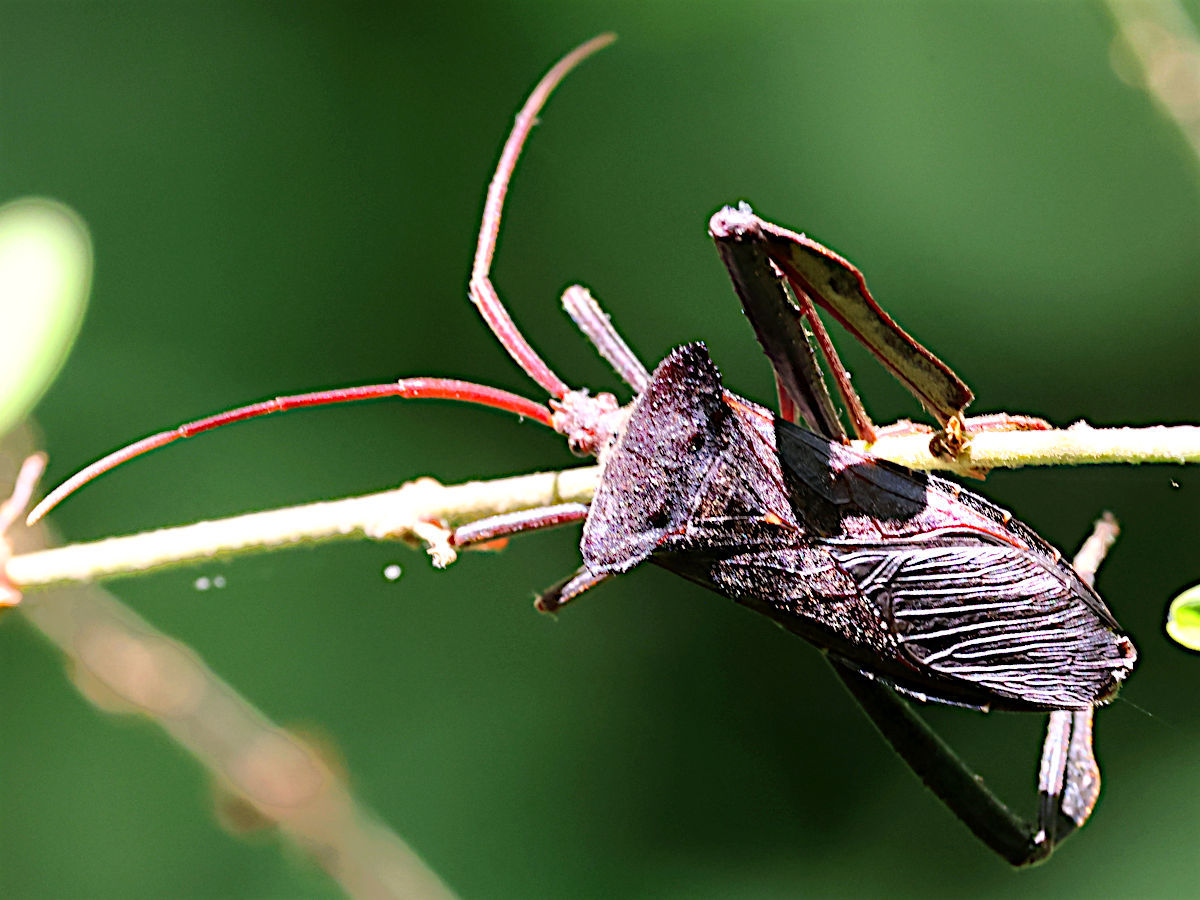
dorsal view

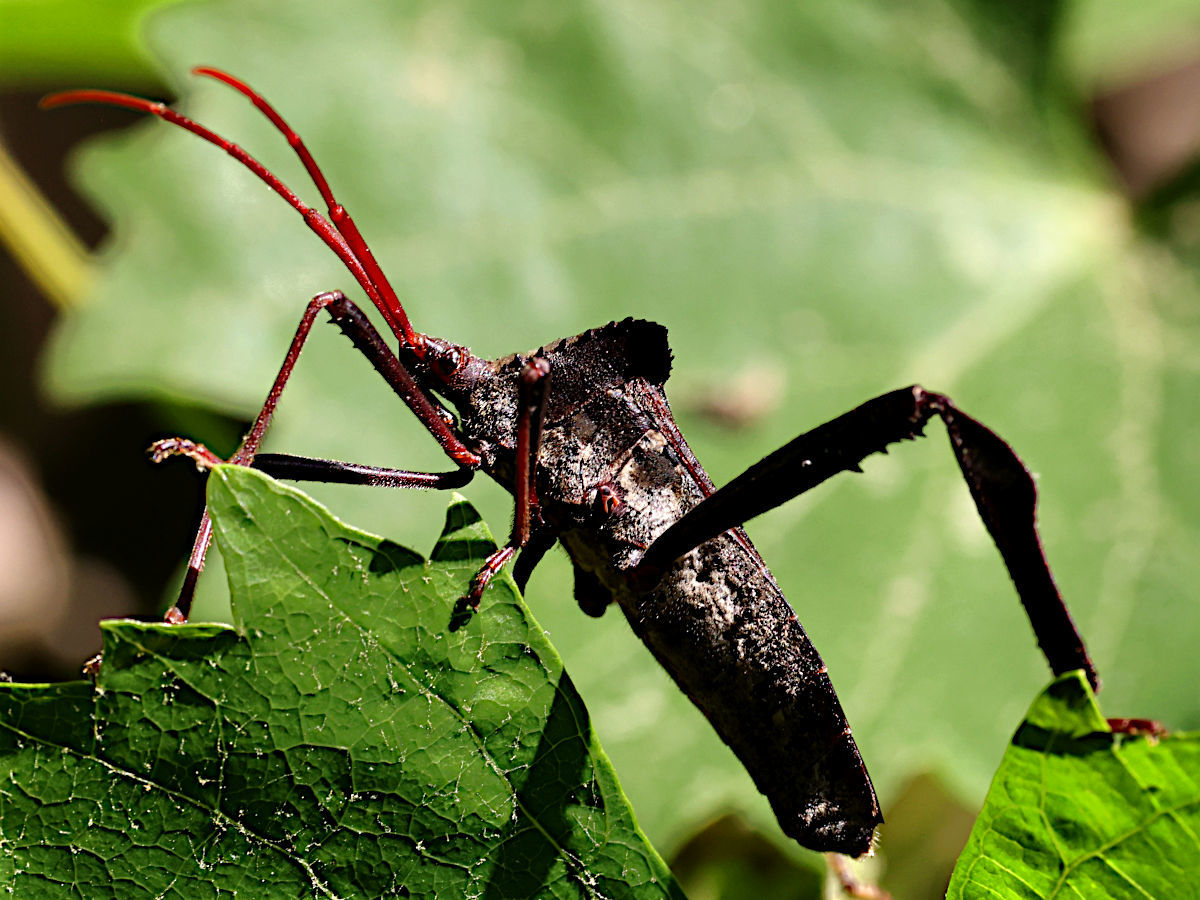
lateral view

One specific characteristic about Acanthocephala declivis is that sexual competition by males pertaining to this species depends on their hind leg dimorphism. They use their legs to squeeze other males when competing for sexual partners. The length and diameter of the large tooth and femur of their hind legs are noticeably larger than the rest of their bodies, proportionally speaking. Females, on the other hand, don’t have these exceptionally large hind legs, although they also use them for mating aggression.
