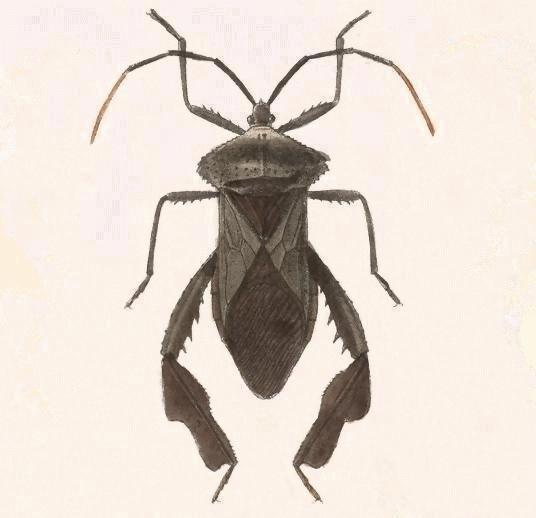
- Acanthocephala alata

Scientific classification
- Kingdom: Animalia
- Phylum: Arthropoda
- Clade: Pancrustacea
- Class: Insecta
- Order: Hemiptera
- Suborder: Heteroptera
- Family: Coreidae
- Subfamily: Coreinae
- Tribe: Acanthocephalini; Stål, 1870

= Acanthocephalini =

Tribe of leaf-footed bugs

Acanthocephalini is a tribe of leaf-footed bugs in the family Coreidae. There are at least 100 described species in Acanthocephalini found in the Americas.

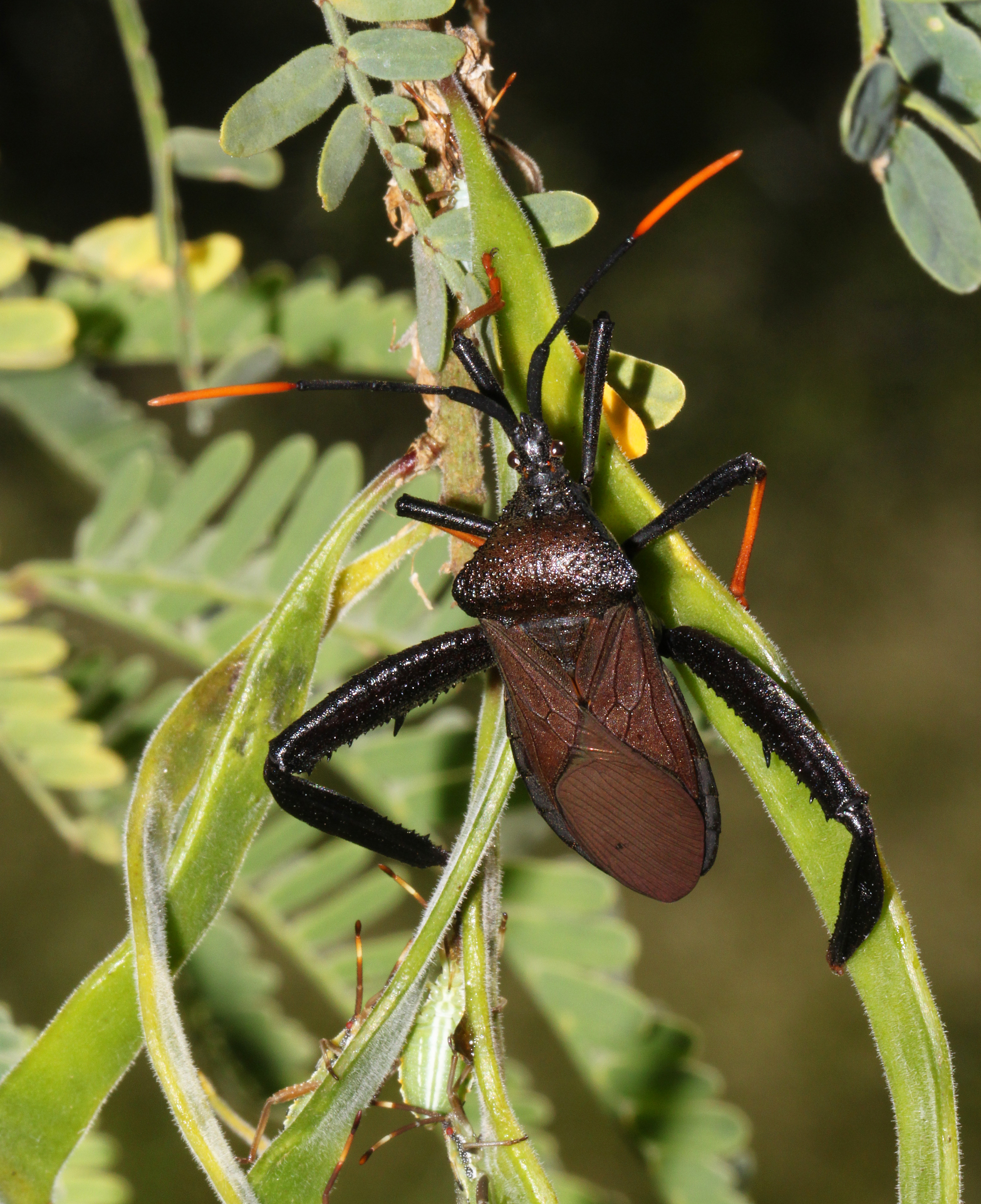
Acanthocephala thomasi

== Genera ==
These 15 genera belong to the tribe Acanthocephalini:

- Acanthocephala Laporte, 1833^{i c g b}
- Cervantistellus Brailovsky and Barrera, 2005^{i c g}
- Cleotopetalops Brailovsky, 2000^{i c g}
- Ctenomelynthus Breddin, 1903^{i c g}
- Empedocles Stål, 1867^{i c g}
- Ichilocoris Brailovsky and Barrera, 2001^{i c g}
- Laminiceps Costa, 1863^{i c g}
- Leptopetalops Breddin, 1901^{i c g}
- Lucullia Stål, 1865^{i c g}
- Meluchopetalops Breddin, 1903^{i c g}
- Petalops Amyot and Serville, 1843^{i c g}
- Placophyllopus Blöte, 1938^{i c g}
- Salapia Stål, 1865^{i c g}
- Stenometapodus Breddin, 1903^{i c g}
- Thymetus Stål, 1867^{i c g}

Data sources: i = ITIS, c = Catalogue of Life, g = GBIF, b = Bugguide.net
