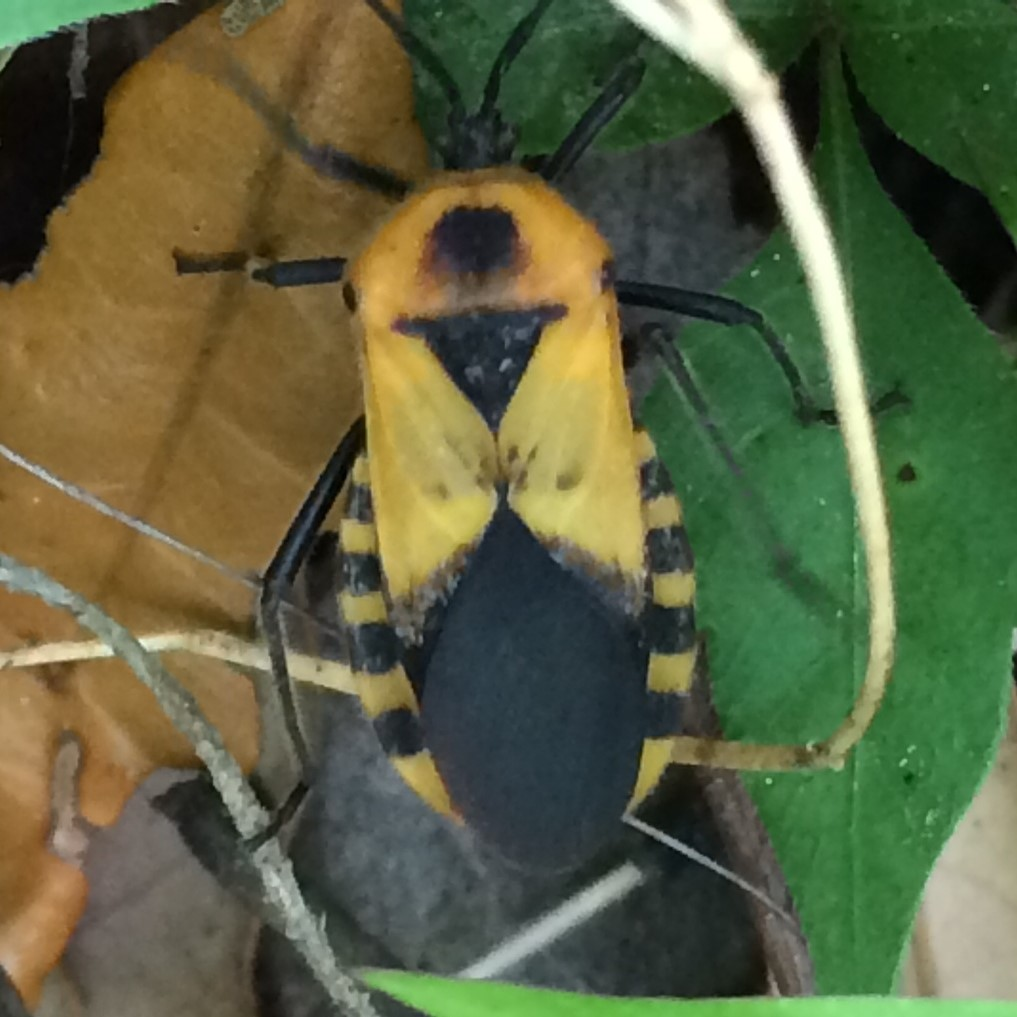

Scientific classification
- Kingdom: Animalia
- Phylum: Arthropoda
- Clade: Pancrustacea
- Class: Insecta
- Order: Hemiptera
- Suborder: Heteroptera
- Family: Coreidae
- Tribe: Spartocerini
- Genus: Sephina
- Species: S. gundlachii

Binomial name
- Sephina gundlachii Guérin-Méneville, 1857

Synonyms
- Sephina grayi Van Duzee, 1909

= Sephina gundlachii =

Species of true bug

Sephina gundlachii, the giant milkweed bug, is a species of leaf-footed bug in the family Coreidae. It is found in North America and the Caribbean.
