= Spartocera fusca =

Scientific classification
- Kingdom: Animalia
- Phylum: Arthropoda
- Clade: Pancrustacea
- Class: Insecta
- Order: Hemiptera
- Suborder: Heteroptera
- Family: Coreidae
- Tribe: Spartocerini
- Genus: Spartocera
- Species: S. fusca

Binomial name
- Spartocera fusca (Thunberg, 1783)

Synonyms
- Spartocera geniculatus Burmeister, 1835

Species of true bug

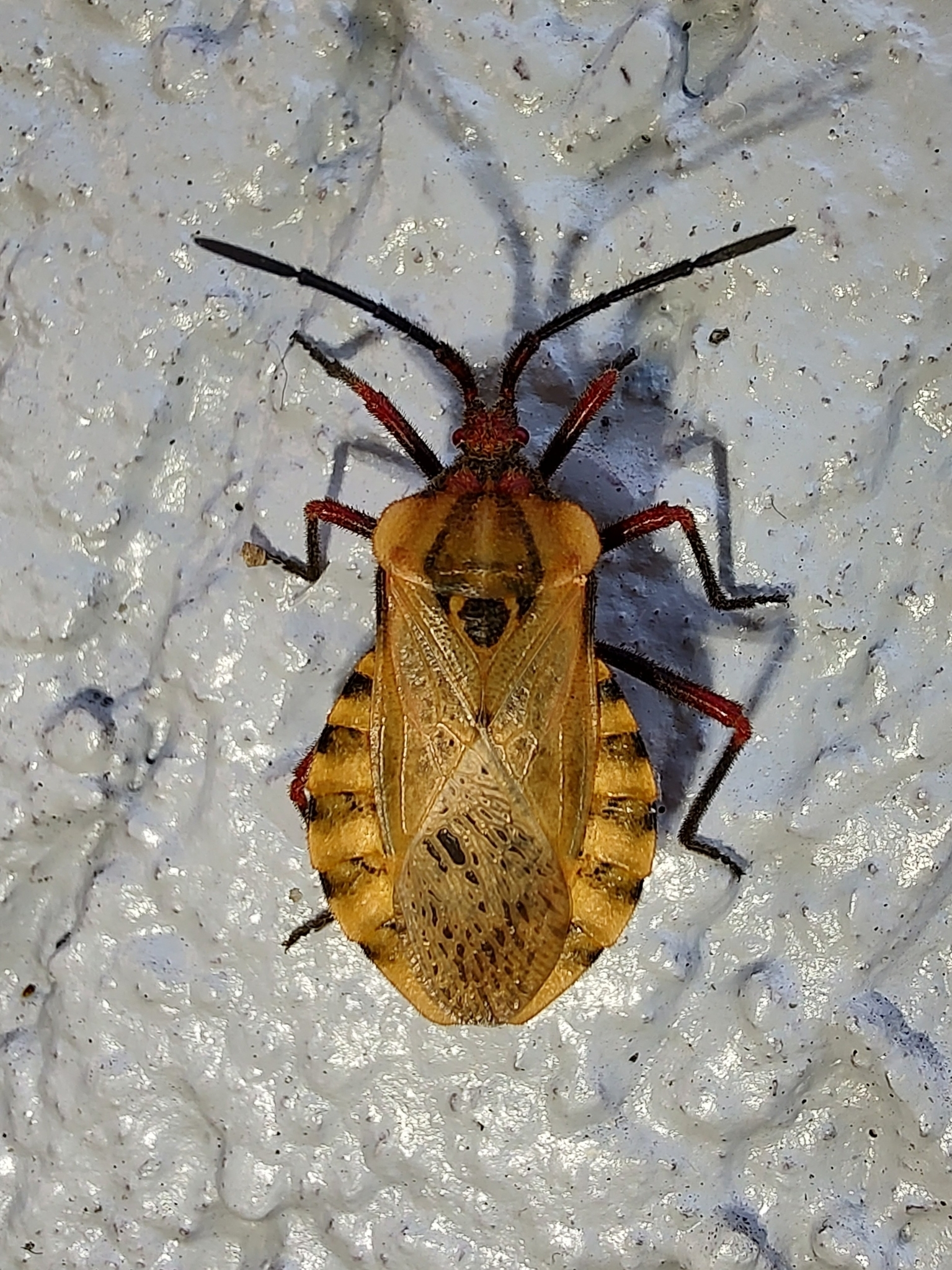
Spartocera fusca

Spartocera fusca is a species of leaf-footed bug in the family Coreidae. It is found in the Caribbean Sea, Central America, North America, and South America.

They have a strong preference for plants in the Nightshade family and feed by piercing the skin of the plant with their needle-like proboscis.
