= Spartocera diffusa =

Scientific classification
- Domain: Eukaryota
- Kingdom: Animalia
- Phylum: Arthropoda
- Class: Insecta
- Order: Hemiptera
- Suborder: Heteroptera
- Family: Coreidae
- Genus: Spartocera
- Species: S. diffusa

Binomial name
- Spartocera diffusa (Say, 1832)

Species of true bug

Spartocera diffusa is a species of leaf-footed bug in the family Coreidae. It is found in North America and the Caribbean.
