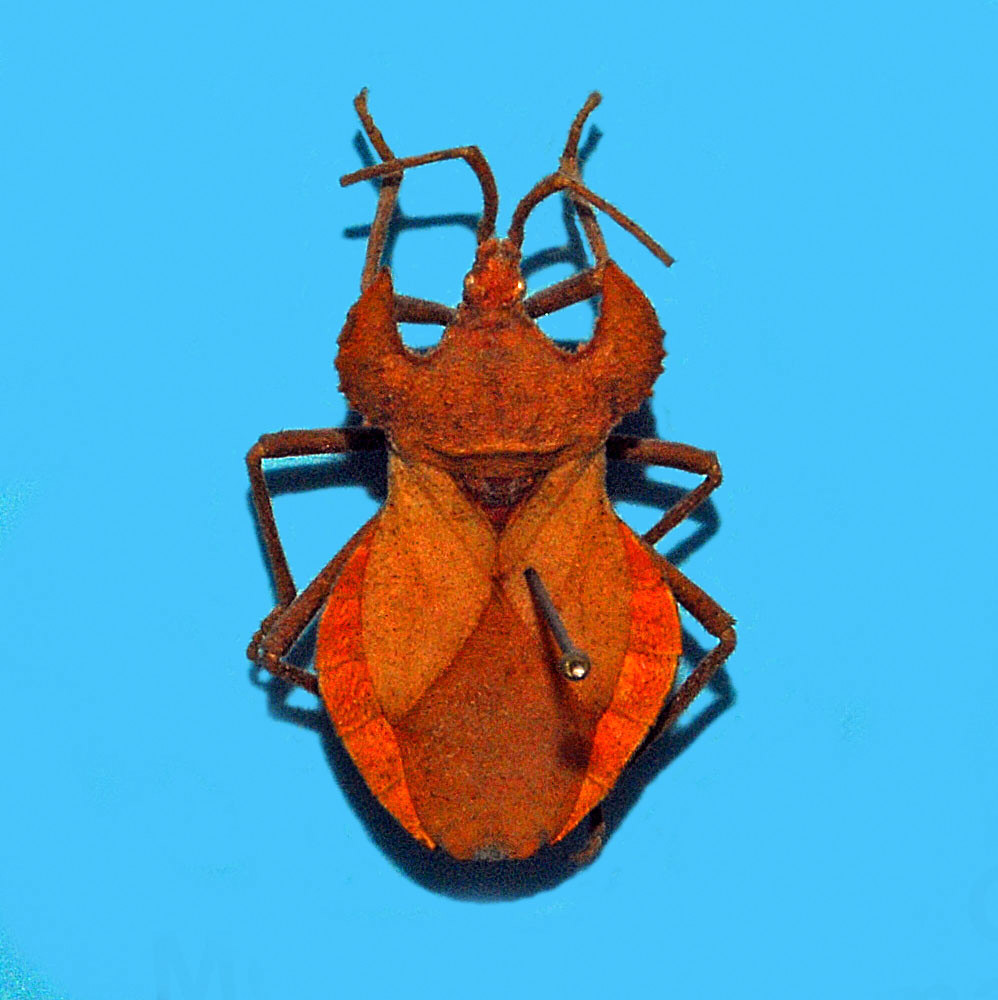
- Menenotus lunatus. Museum specimen

Scientific classification
- Kingdom: Animalia
- Phylum: Arthropoda
- Class: Insecta
- Order: Hemiptera
- Suborder: Heteroptera
- Family: Coreidae
- Genus: Menenotus
- Species: M. lunatus

Binomial name
- Menenotus lunatus (Laporte, 1832)

Synonyms
- Coreus lunulatus Brullé, 1835; Menenotus recurvus Chenu, 1859; Menenotus unicolor Westwood, 1842; Spartocera lunatus Laporte, 1832; Spartocerus lunatus (Laporte, 1832)

= Menenotus lunatus =

Species of true bug

Menenotus lunatus is a species of leaf-footed bug in the Coreinae subfamily.

== Distribution ==
This species is present in Southern America (Argentina, Brazil, Paraguay) and in Southern Europe (Iberian Peninsula, Portugal).
