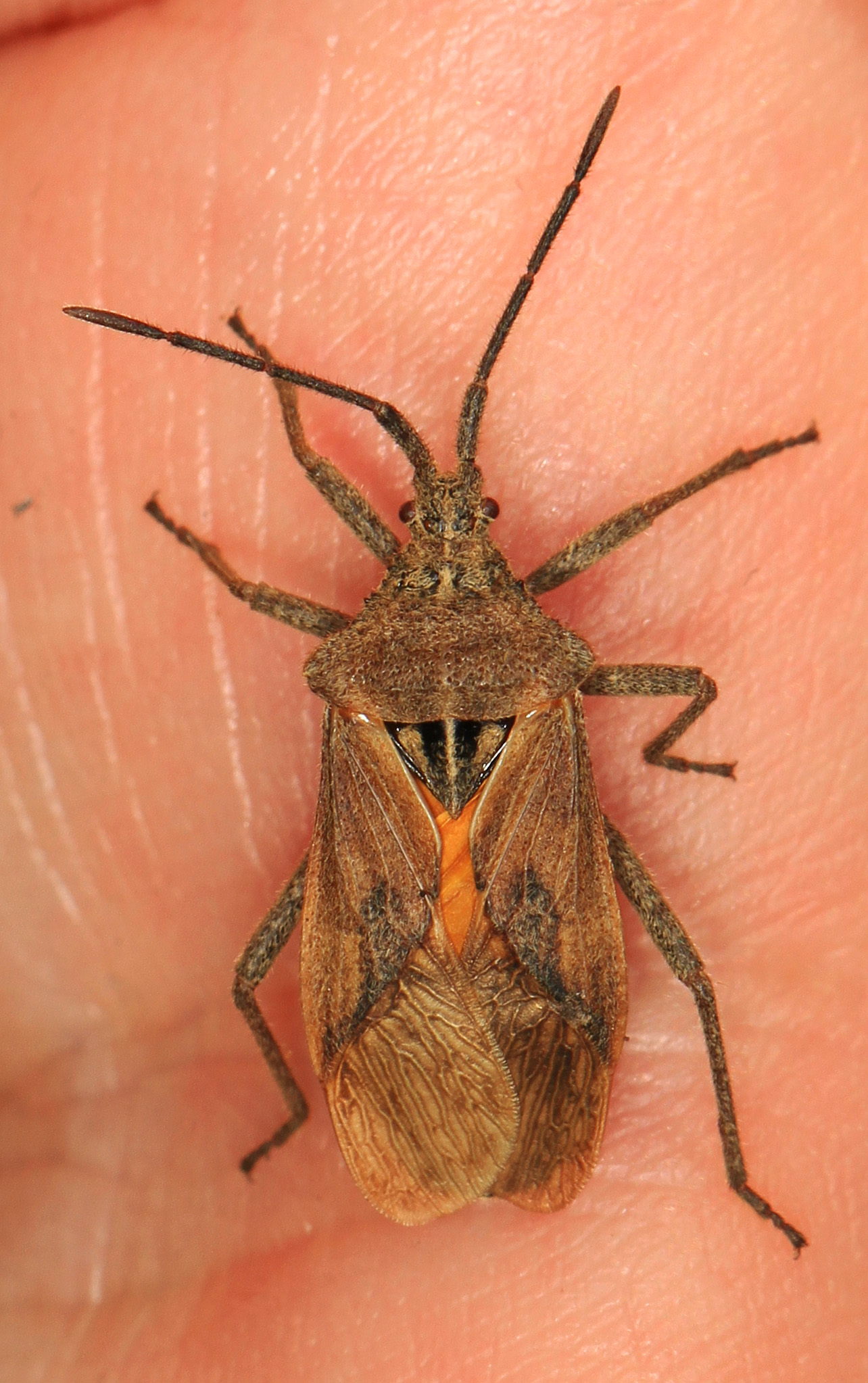
- Eubule spartocerana

Scientific classification
- Kingdom: Animalia
- Phylum: Arthropoda
- Clade: Pancrustacea
- Class: Insecta
- Order: Hemiptera
- Suborder: Heteroptera
- Family: Coreidae
- Subfamily: Coreinae
- Tribe: Spartocerini
- Genus: Eubule; Stål, 1867

= Eubule (bug) =

Genus of true bugs

Eubule is a genus of leaf-footed bugs in the family Coreidae. There are about 13 described species in Eubule.

== Species ==
- Eubule ampliata Valdés, 1910
- Eubule bachmanni Brailovsky, 1992
- Eubule farinosa (Dallas, 1852)
- Eubule glyphica Berg, 1879
- Eubule nigra Brailovsky, 1992
- Eubule rugulosa Brailovsky, 1992
- Eubule sandaracine Brailovsky, 1987
- Eubule sculpta (Perty, 1830)
- Eubule scutellata (Westwood, 1842)
- Eubule serrator (Fabricius, 1803)
- Eubule spartocerana Brailovsky, 1992
- Eubule subdepressa Breddin, 1903
- Eubule trilineata (Signoret, 1861)
