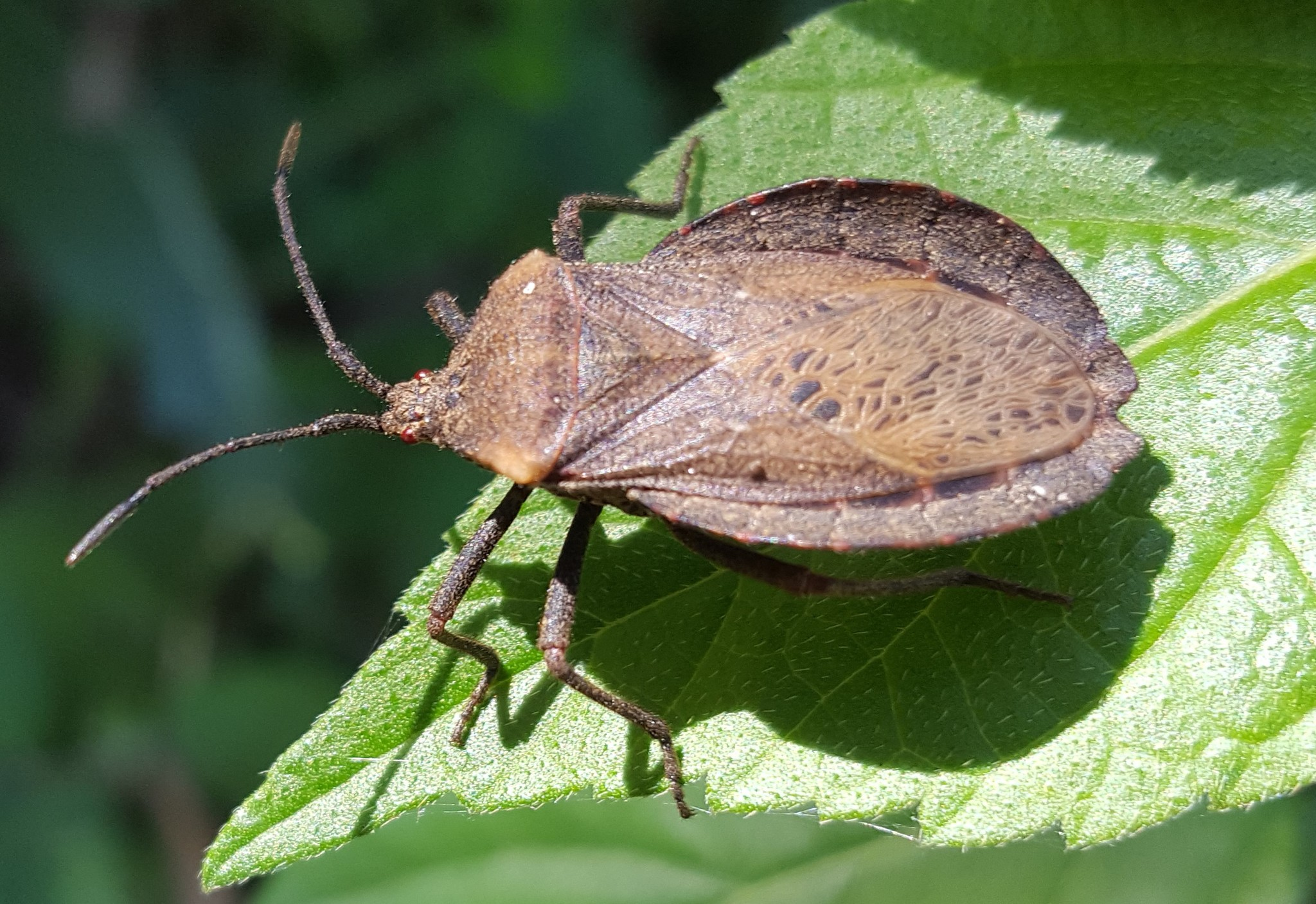

Scientific classification
- Domain: Eukaryota
- Kingdom: Animalia
- Phylum: Arthropoda
- Class: Insecta
- Order: Hemiptera
- Suborder: Heteroptera
- Family: Coreidae
- Genus: Spartocera
- Species: S. batatas

Binomial name
- Spartocera batatas (Fabricius, 1798)

= Spartocera batatas =

Species of true bug

Spartocera batatas, commonly known as the giant sweetpotato bug, is a species of leaf-footed bug in the family Coreidae. It is found in the Caribbean, South America, and North America.
