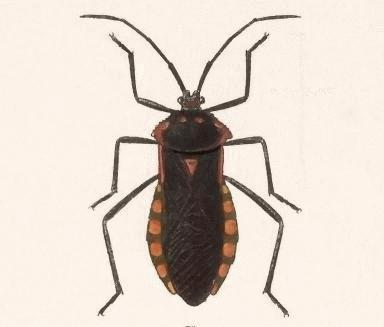
- Sephina bicornis

Scientific classification
- Domain: Eukaryota
- Kingdom: Animalia
- Phylum: Arthropoda
- Class: Insecta
- Order: Hemiptera
- Suborder: Heteroptera
- Family: Coreidae
- Subfamily: Coreinae
- Tribe: Spartocerini
- Genus: Sephina; Amyot & Serville, 1843

= Sephina =

Genus of true bugs

Sephina is a genus of leaf-footed bugs in the family Coreidae. There are more than 20 described species in Sephina.

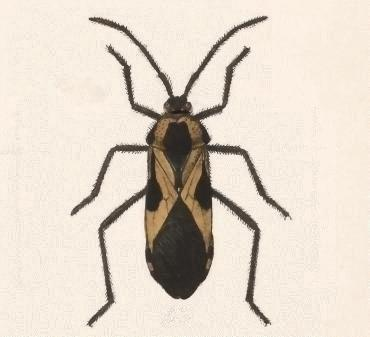
Sephina vinula

== Species ==
These 24 species belong to the genus Sephina:

- Sephina ayalai Brailovsky, 1983
- Sephina bicornis Distant, 1881
- Sephina dorsalis (White, 1842)
- Sephina erythromelas (White, 1842)
- Sephina esquivalae Brailovsky & Sánchez, 1983
- Sephina excellens Schmidt, 1907
- Sephina faceta Brailovsky, 2001
- Sephina formosa (Dallas, 1852)
- Sephina geniculata Distant, 1881
- Sephina gundlachii Guérin-Méneville, 1857 (giant milkweed bug)
- Sephina indierae Wolcott, 1924
- Sephina limbata Stål, 1862
- Sephina maculata (Dallas, 1852)
- Sephina miniacea (Blanchard, 1846)
- Sephina nigripes Schmidt, 1907
- Sephina pagella Brailovsky & Sánchez, 1983
- Sephina pubera (Erichson, 1848)
- Sephina pustulata (Fabricius, 1803)
- Sephina quintanarooana Brailovsky, 1987
- Sephina rogersi Distant, 1881
- Sephina subulata Brailovsky & Sánchez, 1983
- Sephina sulcaticollis Schmidt, 1907
- Sephina talamancana Brailovsky, 2001
- Sephina vinula Stål, 1862
