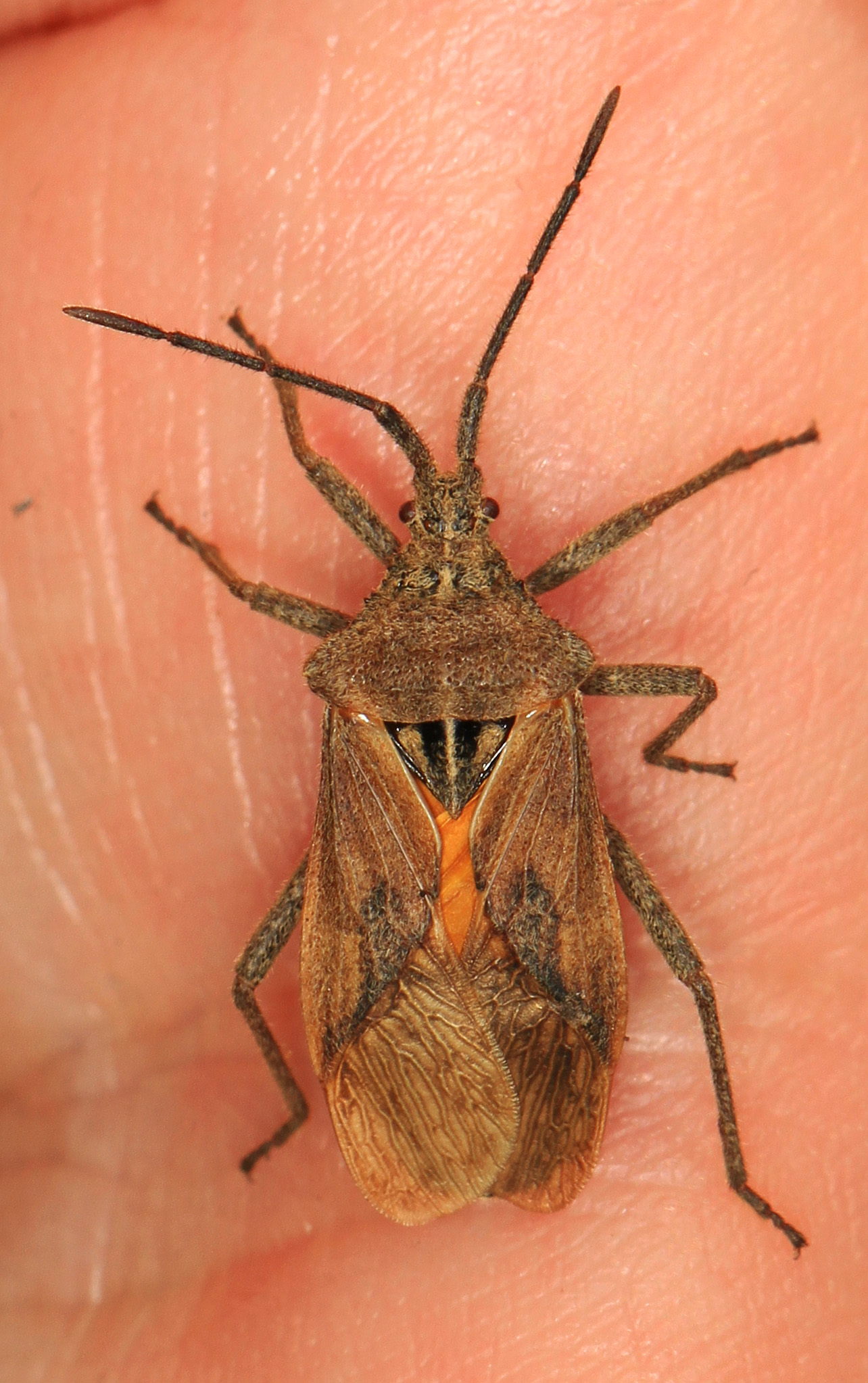

Scientific classification
- Domain: Eukaryota
- Kingdom: Animalia
- Phylum: Arthropoda
- Class: Insecta
- Order: Hemiptera
- Suborder: Heteroptera
- Family: Coreidae
- Genus: Eubule
- Species: E. spartocerana

Binomial name
- Eubule spartocerana Brailovsky, 1992

= Eubule spartocerana =

Species of true bug

Eubule spartocerana is a species of leaf-footed bug in the family Coreidae. It is found in South America.
