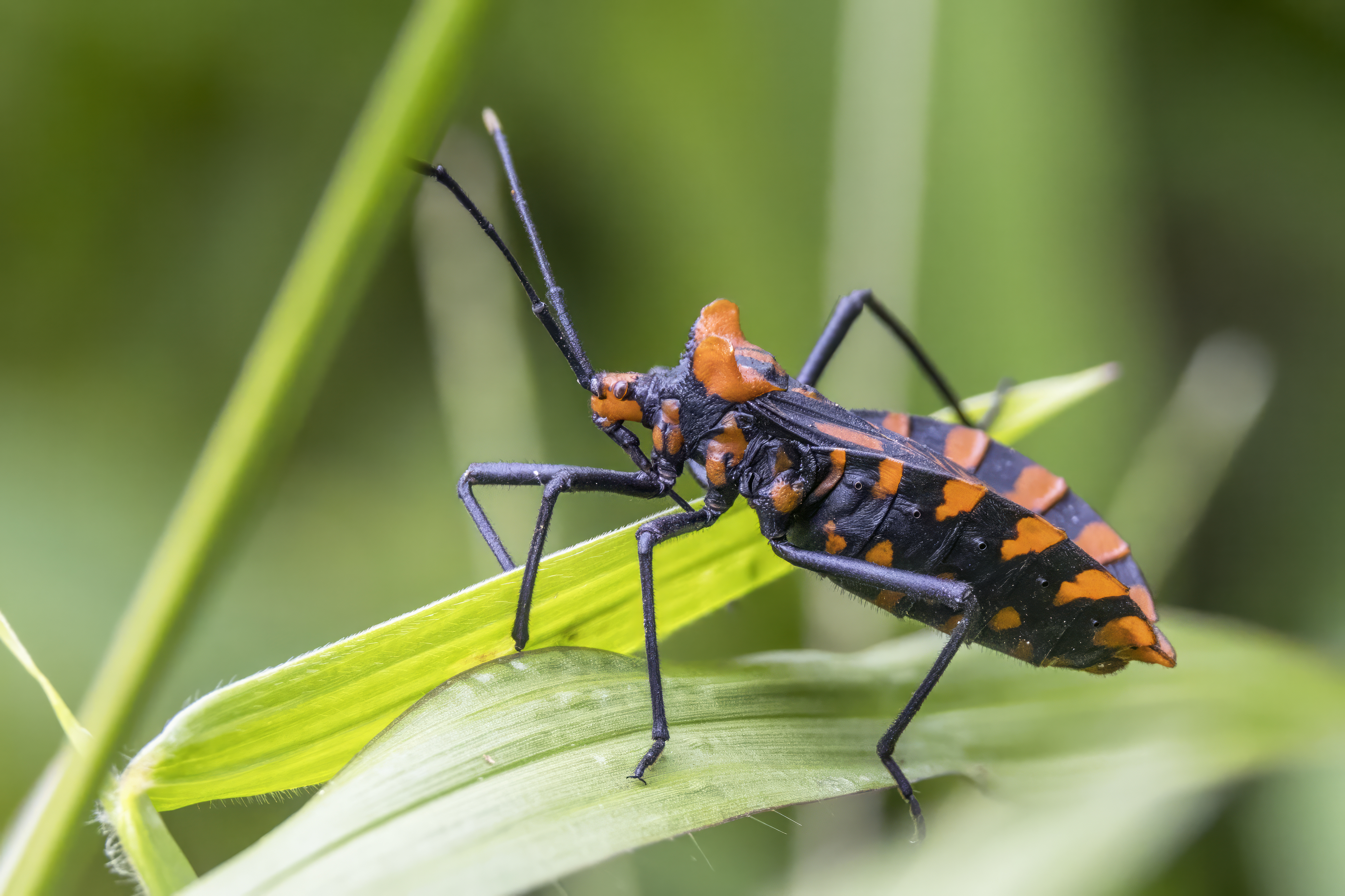
- Spartocera pantomima, Colombia

Scientific classification
- Domain: Eukaryota
- Kingdom: Animalia
- Phylum: Arthropoda
- Class: Insecta
- Order: Hemiptera
- Suborder: Heteroptera
- Family: Coreidae
- Subfamily: Coreinae
- Tribe: Spartocerini
- Genus: Spartocera; Laporte, 1832

= Spartocera =

Genus of true bugs

Spartocera is a genus of leaf-footed bugs in the family Coreidae. There are about 18 described species in Spartocera.

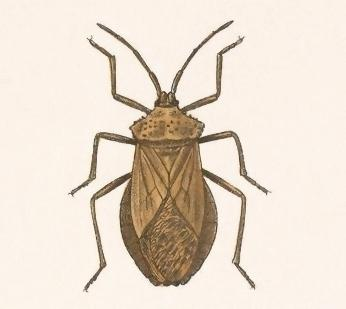
Spartocera granulata

== Species ==
These 18 species belong to the genus Spartocera:

- Spartocera alternata Dallas, 1852
- Spartocera batatas (Fabricius, 1798) (giant sweetpotato bug)
- Spartocera brevicornis Stål, 1870
- Spartocera bruchii (Pennington, 1921)
- Spartocera cinnamomea (Hahn, 1833)
- Spartocera denticulata Stål, 1870
- Spartocera dentiventris Berg, 1883
- Spartocera diffusa (Say, 1832)
- Spartocera dubia Dallas, 1852
- Spartocera fusca (Thunberg, 1783)
- Spartocera gigantea Distant, 1892
- Spartocera grandis Distant, 1901
- Spartocera granulata Stål, 1870
- Spartocera lativentris Stål, 1870
- Spartocera melas Brailovsky, 1987
- Spartocera pantomima (Distant, 1881)
- Spartocera quadricollis Signoret, 1861
- Spartocera rubicunda Spinola, 1852
