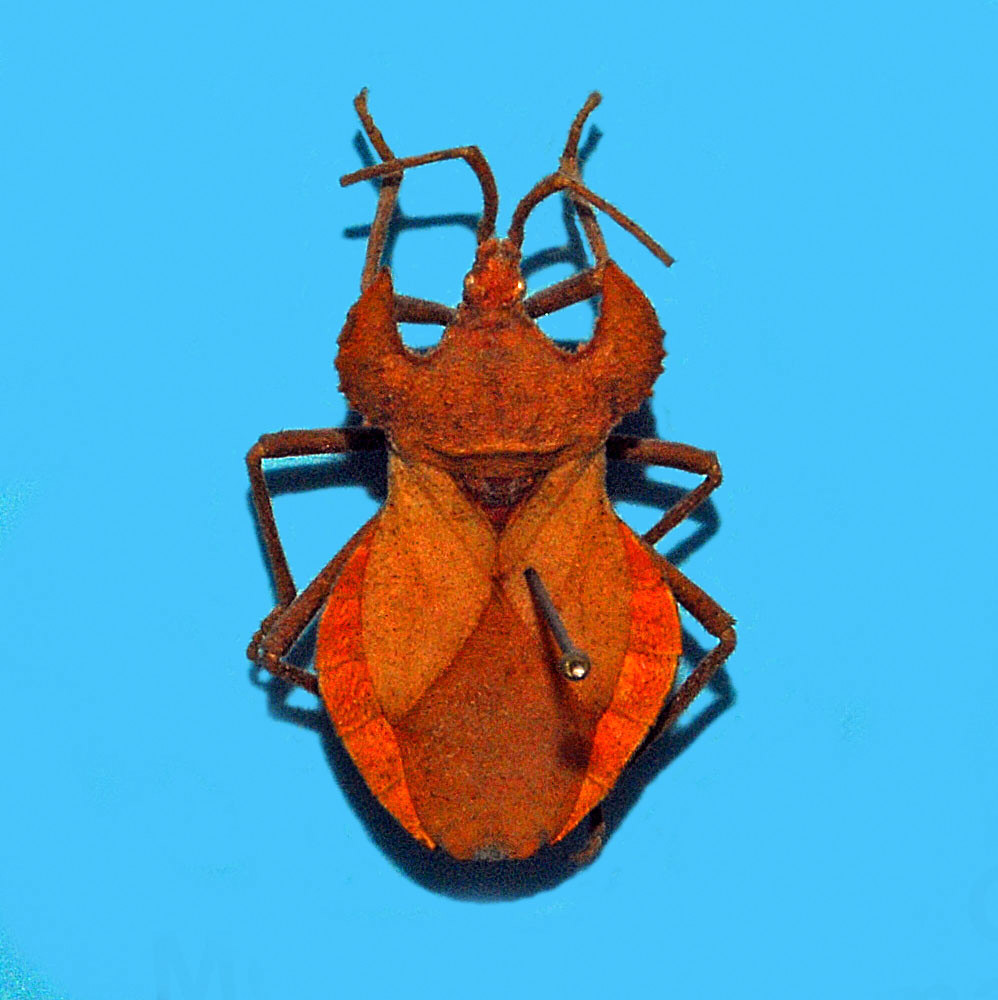
- Menenotus lunatus

Scientific classification
- Kingdom: Animalia
- Phylum: Arthropoda
- Class: Insecta
- Order: Hemiptera
- Suborder: Heteroptera
- Family: Coreidae
- Subfamily: Coreinae
- Genus: Menenotus; Laporte, 1832

= Menenotus =

Genus of true bugs

Menenotus is a genus of leaf-footed bug in the Coreinae subfamily.

== Species ==
Species within this genus include:

- Menenotus diminutus Walker, 1871
- Menenotus lunatus (Laporte, 1832)
