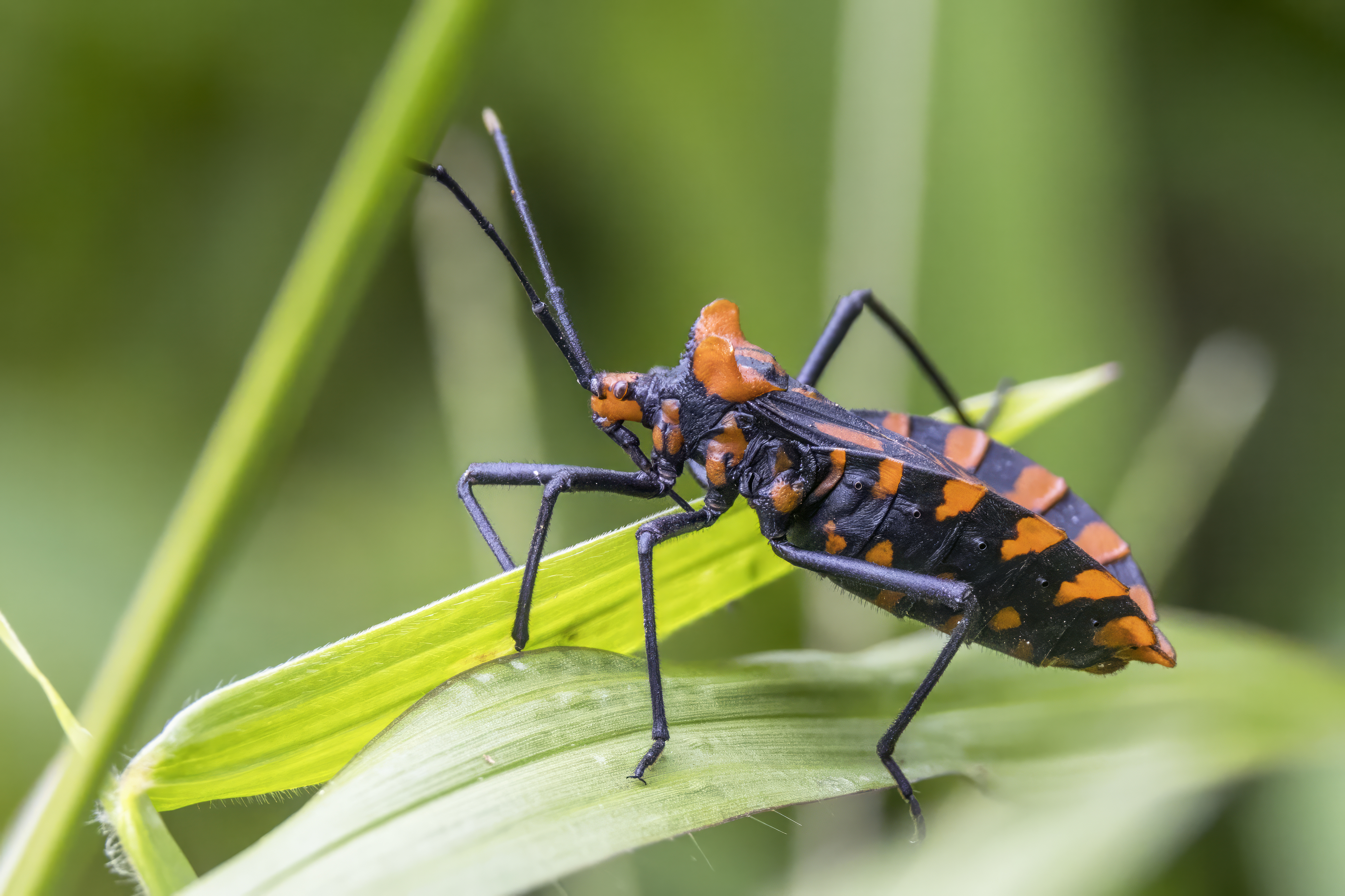
- Spartocera pantomima, Colombia

Scientific classification
- Domain: Eukaryota
- Kingdom: Animalia
- Phylum: Arthropoda
- Class: Insecta
- Order: Hemiptera
- Suborder: Heteroptera
- Family: Coreidae
- Subfamily: Coreinae
- Tribe: Spartocerini; Amyot & Serville, 1843

= Spartocerini =

Tribe of true bugs

Spartocerini is a tribe of leaf-footed bugs in the family Coreidae. There are about 6 genera and at least 60 described species in Spartocerini, typically found in the Americas.

== Genera ==
- Euagona Dallas, 1852
- Eubule Stål, 1867
- Menenotus Laporte, 1832
- Molchina Amyot and Serville, 1843
- Sephina Amyot & Serville, 1843
- Spartocera Laporte, 1832
