= Merocoris typhaeus =

Scientific classification
- Kingdom: Animalia
- Phylum: Arthropoda
- Clade: Pancrustacea
- Class: Insecta
- Order: Hemiptera
- Suborder: Heteroptera
- Family: Coreidae
- Genus: Merocoris
- Species: M. typhaeus

Binomial name
- Merocoris typhaeus (Fabricius, 1798)

Species of true bug

Merocoris typhaeus is a species of leaf-footed bug in the family Coreidae. It is found in the Caribbean Sea and North America.
