= Merocoris distinctus =

Scientific classification
- Domain: Eukaryota
- Kingdom: Animalia
- Phylum: Arthropoda
- Class: Insecta
- Order: Hemiptera
- Suborder: Heteroptera
- Family: Coreidae
- Tribe: Merocorini
- Genus: Merocoris
- Species: M. distinctus

Binomial name
- Merocoris distinctus Dallas, 1852

Species of true bug

Merocoris distinctus is a species of leaf-footed bug in the family Coreidae. It is found in Central America and North America.
