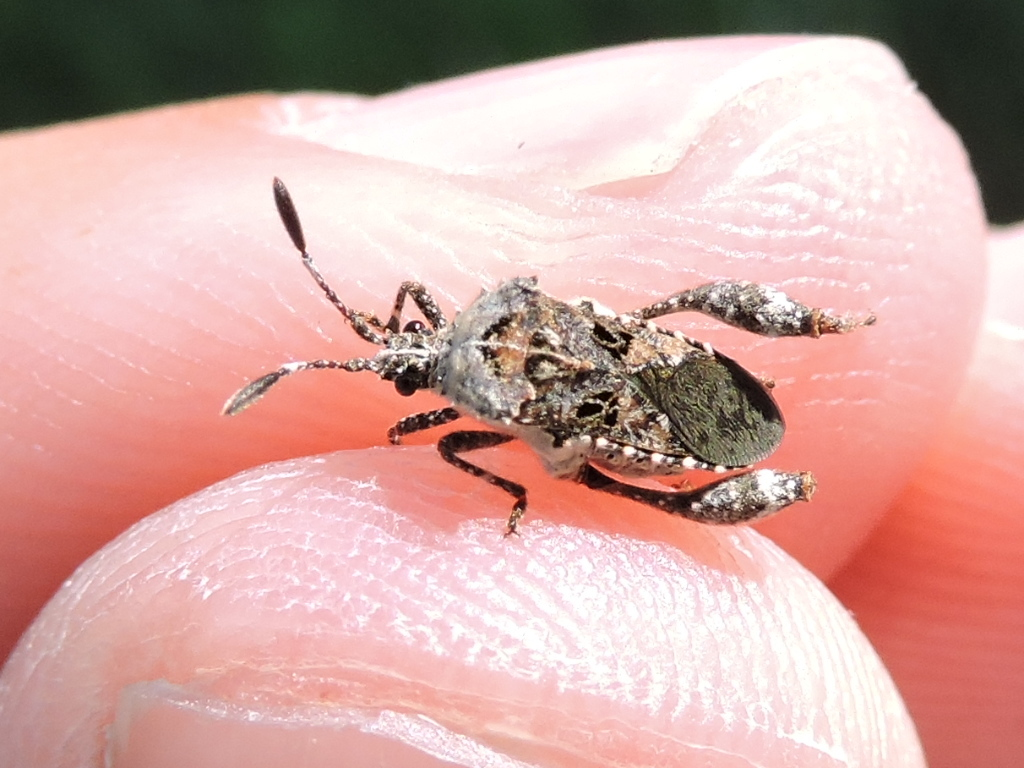
- Merocoris curtatus

Scientific classification
- Domain: Eukaryota
- Kingdom: Animalia
- Phylum: Arthropoda
- Class: Insecta
- Order: Hemiptera
- Suborder: Heteroptera
- Family: Coreidae
- Genus: Merocoris
- Species: M. curtatus

Binomial name
- Merocoris curtatus Mcatee, 1919

= Merocoris curtatus =

Species of true bug

Merocoris curtatus is a species of leaf-footed bug in the family Coreidae. It is found in North America.
