= Merocoris =

Scientific classification
- Domain: Eukaryota
- Kingdom: Animalia
- Phylum: Arthropoda
- Class: Insecta
- Order: Hemiptera
- Suborder: Heteroptera
- Family: Coreidae
- Tribe: Merocorini
- Genus: Merocoris; Perty, 1833

Synonyms
- Merocoris Hahn, 1834

Genus of true bugs

Merocoris is a genus of leaf-footed bugs in the family Coreidae. There are about eight described species in the genus Merocoris.

== Species ==
These eight species belong to the genus Merocoris:

- Merocoris bergi Mayr, 1879
- Merocoris curtatus Mcatee, 1919
- Merocoris distinctus Dallas, 1852
- Merocoris elevatus (Spinola, 1837)
- Merocoris lugubris Perty, 1833
- Merocoris tristis Perty, 1833
- Merocoris tumulus Brailovsky & Barrera, 2009
- Merocoris typhaeus (Fabricius, 1798)
