= Acanthocerus lobatus =

Scientific classification
- Kingdom: Animalia
- Phylum: Arthropoda
- Class: Insecta
- Order: Hemiptera
- Suborder: Heteroptera
- Family: Coreidae
- Tribe: Acanthocerini
- Genus: Acanthocerus
- Species: A. lobatus

Binomial name
- Acanthocerus lobatus (Burmeister, 1835)

Species of true bug

Acanthocerus lobatus is a species of leaf-footed bug in the family Coreidae. It is found in the Caribbean Sea, North America, and the Caribbean.
