= List of Scelio species =

This is a list of 244 species in Scelio, a genus of parasitoid wasps in the family Platygastridae.

== Scelio species ==
- Scelio acontes Kozlov & Lê, 1988^{i c g}
- Scelio acte Walker, 1846^{i c g}
- Scelio aegyptiacus Priesner, 1951^{i c g}
- Scelio afer Kieffer, 1905^{i c g}
- Scelio africanus Risbec, 1950^{i c g}
- Scelio alfierii Priesner, 1951^{i c g}
- Scelio amoenus Dodd, 1927^{i c g}
- Scelio ancilla Kozlov & Lê, 1988^{i c g}
- Scelio anmarae Dangerfield & Austin, 2001^{i c g}
- Scelio annae Dangerfield & Austin, 2001^{i c g}
- Scelio antorides Nixon, 1958^{i c g}
- Scelio anyirambo Dangerfield & Austin, 2001^{i c g}
- Scelio apo Kozlov & Lê, 1988^{i c g}
- Scelio approbatus Kozlov & Kononova, 1990^{i c g}
- Scelio aratigena Kieffer, 1913^{i c g}
- Scelio arion Kozlov & Lê, 1988^{i c g}
- Scelio asperatus Dodd, 1927^{i c g}
- Scelio auronitens Kieffer, 1910^{i c g}
- Scelio aurosparsus Kieffer, 1910^{i c g}
- Scelio australiensis Kieffer, 1905^{i c g}
- Scelio bakeri Kieffer, 1908^{i c g}
- Scelio baoli Risbec, 1950^{i c g}
- Scelio bengalensis Mukerjee, 1979^{i c g}
- Scelio bicolor Fouts, 1930^{i c g}
- Scelio bipartitus Kieffer, 1907^{i c g}
- Scelio bisectus Kieffer, 1914^{i c g}
- Scelio borroloolensis Dangerfield & Austin, 2001^{i c g}
- Scelio brasiliensis Kieffer, 1910^{i c g}
- Scelio bronae Dangerfield & Austin, 2001^{i c g}
- Scelio cahirensis Priesner, 1951^{i c g}
- Scelio calcuttaensis Mani, 1936^{i c g}
- Scelio callimone Kozlov & Lê, 1988^{i c g}
- Scelio caloptenorum Riley, 1886^{i c g}
- Scelio calopterus Kieffer, 1909^{i c g}
- Scelio cellularis Kieffer, 1916^{i c g}
- Scelio ceto Kozlov & Lê, 1988^{i c g}
- Scelio chapmanni Nixon, 1958^{i c g}
- Scelio cheops Nixon, 1958^{i c g}
- Scelio chortoicetes Froggatt, 1910^{i c g}
- Scelio cinctus Kozlov & Kononova, 1990^{i c g}
- Scelio clarus Fouts, 1934^{i c g}
- Scelio commixtus Muesebeck, 1972^{i c g}
- Scelio concinnus Dodd, 1927^{i c g}
- Scelio conformis Muesebeck, 1972^{i c g}
- Scelio conon Kozlov & Lê, 1988^{i c g}
- Scelio consobrinus Kieffer, 1913^{i c g}
- Scelio contractus Dodd, 1927^{i c g}
- Scelio coriaceiventris Kieffer, 1908^{i c g}
- Scelio coriaceus Kozlov & Kononova, 1990^{i c g}
- Scelio corion Nixon, 1958^{i c g}
- Scelio correctus Kozlov & Kononova, 1990^{i c g}
- Scelio crassellus Dodd, 1920^{i c g}
- Scelio crassiceps Priesner, 1951^{i c g}
- Scelio croces Kozlov & Lê, 1988^{i c g}
- Scelio cruentatus Dodd, 1914^{i c g}
- Scelio desinens Kozlov & Kononova, 1990^{i c g}
- Scelio dhupgarhi Mukerjee, 1979^{i c g}
- Scelio dichropli De Santis & Loiacono, 1993^{i c g}
- Scelio diemenensis Dodd, 1914^{i c g}
- Scelio difficilis Priesner, 1951^{i c g}
- Scelio dion Kozlov & Lê, 1988^{i c g}
- Scelio doddi Dangerfield & Austin, 2001^{i c g}
- Scelio dodes Kozlov & Lê, 1988^{i c g}
- Scelio dones Kozlov & Lê, 1988^{i c g}
- Scelio elongatus Kieffer, 1908^{i c g}
- Scelio ernstii Riley, 1886^{i c g}
- Scelio erythrogaster Kieffer, 1908^{i c g}
- Scelio erythropoda Cameron, 1888^{i c g}
- Scelio erythropus Dodd, 1920^{i c g}
- Scelio evanescens Kozlov & Kononova, 1990^{i c g}
- Scelio exaratus (Kieffer, 1910)^{i c g}
- Scelio facialis Kieffer, 1916^{i c g}
- Scelio festivus Kieffer, 1910^{i c g}
- Scelio flavibarbis (Marshall, 1874)^{i c g}
- Scelio flavicornis Dodd, 1913^{i c g}
- Scelio flavicoxis Kieffer, 1905^{i c g}
- Scelio flavigaster Dangerfield & Austin, 2001^{i c g}
- Scelio flavocinctus Kieffer, 1910^{i c g}
- Scelio floridanus Ashmead, 1893^{i c g b}
- Scelio floridus Kozlov & Kononova, 1990^{i c g}
- Scelio fomes Kozlov & Lê, 1988^{i c g}
- Scelio fritzi De Santis & Loiacono, 1993^{i c g}
- Scelio fulgidus Crawford, 1911^{i c g}
- Scelio fulvipes Förster, 1856^{i c g}
- Scelio fulvithorax Dodd, 1927^{i c g}
- Scelio furcatus Kieffer, 1909^{i c g}
- Scelio fuscicoxis Kieffer, 1905^{i c g}
- Scelio gallowayi Dangerfield & Austin, 2001^{i c g}
- Scelio gaudens Nixon, 1958^{i c g}
- Scelio gobar Walker, 1839^{i c g}
- Scelio goron Kozlov & Lê, 1988^{i c g}
- Scelio gracilis Kozlov & Kononova, 1990^{i c g}
- Scelio grbini Dangerfield & Austin, 2001^{i c g}
- Scelio grongtes Kozlov & Lê, 1988^{i c g}
- Scelio guatemalensis Kieffer, 1906^{i c g}
- Scelio habilis Nixon, 1958^{i c g}
- Scelio hieroglyphi Timberlake, 1932^{i c g}
- Scelio hilaris De Santis & Loiacono, 1993^{i c g}
- Scelio homona Kozlov & Lê, 1988^{i c g}
- Scelio horai Mani, 1936^{i c g}
- Scelio howardi Crawford, 1910^{i c g}
- Scelio husseini Priesner, 1951^{i c g}
- Scelio hyalinipennis Ashmead, 1887^{i c g}
- Scelio hypena Kozlov & Lê, 1988^{i c g}
- Scelio ignobilis Dodd, 1927^{i c g}
- Scelio improcerus Dodd, 1927^{i c g}
- Scelio incertus Muesebeck, 1972^{i c g}
- Scelio inermis (Zetterstedt, 1840)^{i c g}
- Scelio insolitus Muesebeck, 1972^{i c g}
- Scelio integer Kieffer, 1908^{i c g}
- Scelio javanicus Roepke, 1916^{i c g}
- Scelio jokentae Dangerfield & Austin, 2001^{i c g}
- Scelio joni Dangerfield & Austin, 2001^{i c g}
- Scelio levifrons Kieffer, 1908^{i c g}
- Scelio lineolatus Kozlov & Kononova, 1990^{i c g}
- Scelio littoralis Dodd, 1927^{i c g}
- Scelio locustae Dodd, 1914^{i c g}
- Scelio longiventris Kieffer, 1908^{i c g}
- Scelio loretanus De Santis & Loiacono, 1993^{i c g}
- Scelio lugens Kieffer, 1910^{i c g}
- Scelio luzonicus Kieffer, 1914^{i c g}
- Scelio macrotomus Kieffer, 1916^{i c g}
- Scelio magnus Kozlov & Kononova, 1990^{i c g}
- Scelio mallapura Mukerjee, 1979^{i c g}
- Scelio mannesi Dangerfield & Austin, 2001^{i c g}
- Scelio marbis Nixon, 1958^{i c g}
- Scelio mareebaensis Dangerfield & Austin, 2001^{i c g}
- Scelio maritimus Kozlov & Kononova, 1990^{i c g}
- Scelio matthewsi Dangerfield & Austin, 2001^{i c g}
- Scelio mauritanicus Risbec, 1950^{i c g}
- Scelio meridionalis Dangerfield & Austin, 2001^{i c g}
- Scelio microcerus Kieffer, 1916^{i c g}
- Scelio mikei Dangerfield & Austin, 2001^{i c g}
- Scelio mimaces Kozlov & Lê, 1988^{i c g}
- Scelio munnaricus Mukerjee, 1979^{i c g}
- Scelio muraii Watanabe, 1955^{i c g}
- Scelio nakhlensis Priesner, 1951^{i c g}
- Scelio nanocuspis Dangerfield & Austin, 2001^{i c g}
- Scelio naumanni Dangerfield & Austin, 2001^{i c g}
- Scelio nerion Kozlov & Lê, 1988^{i c g}
- Scelio nigricornis Dodd, 1913^{i c g}
- Scelio nigricoxa Dodd, 1914^{i c g}
- Scelio nigriscutellum Dodd, 1913^{i c g}
- Scelio nigrobrunneus Dodd, 1927^{i c g}
- Scelio nikolskyi Ogloblin, 1927^{i c g}
- Scelio nilamburensis Mukerjee, 1979^{i c g}
- Scelio nisa Kozlov, 1972^{i c g}
- Scelio nitens Brues, 1906^{i c g}
- Scelio noancilla Kozlov & Lê, 2000^{i c g}
- Scelio notabilis Dodd, 1927^{i c g}
- Scelio odites Kozlov & Lê, 1988^{i c g}
- Scelio oedipodae Ashmead, 1893^{i c g}
- Scelio opacus (Provancher, 1887)^{i c g}
- Scelio orientalis Dodd, 1915^{i c g}
- Scelio oviphagus Mukerji, 1953^{i c g}
- Scelio ovivorus (Riley, 1878)^{i c g}
- Scelio oxyae Timberlake, 1932^{i c g}
- Scelio paivai Mani, 1936^{i c g}
- Scelio pakistanensis Siddiqui et al., 1983^{i c g}
- Scelio pakistanicus Mahmood et al., 1988^{i c g}
- Scelio pallidipes Ashmead, 1893^{i c g}
- Scelio paracroces Kozlov & Lê, 2000^{i c g}
- Scelio paraensis Kieffer, 1910^{i c g}
- Scelio paraspinifera Kozlov & Lê, 1988^{i c g}
- Scelio parvicornis Dodd, 1914^{i c g}
- Scelio pembertoni Timberlake, 1932^{i c g}
- Scelio perspicuus Dodd, 1927^{i c g}
- Scelio petilus Dangerfield & Austin, 2001^{i c g}
- Scelio philippinensis Ashmead, 1905^{i c g}
- Scelio pigotti Dangerfield & Austin, 2001^{i c g}
- Scelio pilosifrons Dodd, 1927^{i c g}
- Scelio pilosus Dodd, 1913^{i c g}
- Scelio planithorax Dodd, 1927^{i c g}
- Scelio plasticus Kozlov & Kononova, 1990^{i c g}
- Scelio poecilopterus Priesner, 1951^{i c g}
- Scelio popovi Nixon, 1958^{i c g}
- Scelio princeps Nixon, 1958^{i c g}
- Scelio psenes Kozlov & Lê, 1988^{i c g}
- Scelio pseudaustralis Dangerfield & Austin, 2001^{i c g}
- Scelio pulchripennis Brues, 1906^{i c g}
- Scelio pumilus Muesebeck, 1972^{i c g}
- Scelio punctaticeps Dodd, 1914^{i c g}
- Scelio remaudierei Ferrière, 1952^{i c g}
- Scelio reticulatum Dangerfield & Austin, 2001^{i c g}
- Scelio rubripes Kieffer, 1908^{i c g}
- Scelio rufiventris Kozlov & Kononova, 1990^{i c g}
- Scelio rufonotatus Kieffer, 1906^{i c g}
- Scelio rufulus Muesebeck, 1972^{i c g}
- Scelio rugosulus Latreille, 1805^{i c g}
- Scelio rugosus Kozlov & Kononova, 1990^{i c g}
- Scelio rusticus De Santis & Loiacono, 1993^{i c g}
- Scelio ruticulus Kozlov & Kononova, 1990^{i c g}
- Scelio rutilus Kozlov & Kononova, 1990^{i c g}
- Scelio satpurus Mukerjee, 1979^{i c g}
- Scelio schmelio Dangerfield & Austin, 2001^{i c g}
- Scelio scottusae Ogloblin, 1965^{i c g}
- Scelio scyllinopsi Ogloblin, 1965^{i c g}
- Scelio sectigena Kieffer, 1908^{i c g}
- Scelio semiatratus De Santis & Loiacono, 1993^{i c g}
- Scelio semirufus Muesebeck, 1972^{i c g}
- Scelio semisanguineus Girault, 1914^{i c g}
- Scelio serdangensis Timberlake, 1932^{i c g}
- Scelio setafascis Dangerfield & Austin, 2001^{i c g}
- Scelio setiger Brues, 1918^{i c g}
- Scelio similis Kozlov & Kononova, 1990^{i c g}
- Scelio singularis Muesebeck, 1972^{i c g}
- Scelio solus Muesebeck, 1972^{i c g}
- Scelio spinifera Mukerjee, 1979^{i c g}
- Scelio splendidus Kieffer, 1910^{i c g}
- Scelio squamosus Muesebeck, 1972^{i c g}
- Scelio striatifacies Dodd, 1914^{i c g}
- Scelio striatiscutum De Santis & Loiacono, 1993^{i c g}
- Scelio striativentris Kieffer, 1908^{i c g}
- Scelio striatus Priesner, 1951^{i c g}
- Scelio subpolitus Dodd, 1920^{i c g}
- Scelio sudanensis Ferrière, 1952^{i c g}
- Scelio sulcaticeps Dodd, 1927^{i c g}
- Scelio tasmaniensis Dangerfield & Austin, 2001^{i c g}
- Scelio taylori Nixon, 1958^{i c g}
- Scelio tenuipilosus De Santis & Loiacono, 1993^{i c g}
- Scelio thomsoni Kieffer, 1913^{i c g}
- Scelio transversalis Kozlov & Kononova, 1990^{i c g}
- Scelio travancoricus Mukerjee, 1979^{i c g}
- Scelio tripartitus Kieffer, 1906^{i c g}
- Scelio trisectus Kieffer, 1908^{i c g}
- Scelio tristis Nixon, 1958^{i c g}
- Scelio tsuruokensis Watanabe, 1955^{i c g}
- Scelio unidentis Dangerfield & Austin, 2001^{i c g}
- Scelio urgo Kozlov & Lê, 1988^{i c g}
- Scelio uvarovi Ogloblin, 1927^{i c g}
- Scelio vallecularis Kozlov & Kononova, 1990^{i c g}
- Scelio variegatus Kozlov & Kononova, 1990^{i c g}
- Scelio variicornis Kieffer, 1913^{i c g}
- Scelio variipennis Kieffer, 1916^{i c g}
- Scelio varipunctatus Dodd, 1915^{i c g}
- Scelio venatus Brues, 1906^{i c g}
- Scelio vulgaris Kieffer, 1908^{i c g}
- Scelio walkeri Kieffer, 1913^{i c g}
- Scelio wallacei Dodd, 1920^{i c g}
- Scelio wittmeri Priesner, 1951^{i c g}
- Scelio xanthopterus Kieffer, 1916^{i c g}
- Scelio zafari Mahmood et al., 1988^{i c g}
- Scelio zborowskii Dangerfield & Austin, 2001^{i c g}
- Scelio zolotarevskyi Ferrière, 1930^{i c g}

Data sources: i = ITIS, c = Catalogue of Life, g = GBIF, b = Bugguide.net
