= List of Telenomus species =

List of insect species

Compiled from Australian Faunal Directory, IRMNG, GBIF, and Insects of the World. (Species from GBIF include species which are not accepted.)

- Telenomus abdominalis ^{g}
- Telenomus aberrans ^{g}
- Telenomus abnormis ^{g}
- Telenomus acares ^{a i}
- Telenomus acarnas ^{g}
- Telenomus acrobates ^{g}
- Telenomus adelphus ^{g}
- Telenomus aegeus ^{a i}
- Telenomus aegicerophilus ^{a i}
- Telenomus afficis ^{g}
- Telenomus ajax ^{a i}
- Telenomus albator ^{g}
- Telenomus albatorius ^{g}
- Telenomus albicollis ^{g}
- Telenomus albicoxatus ^{g}
- Telenomus alcon ^{g}
- Telenomus alecto ^{g}
- Telenomus algericus ^{g}
- Telenomus algiricus ^{g}
- Telenomus alsophilae ^{g}
- Telenomus alternator ^{g}
- Telenomus americanus ^{g}
- Telenomus ampullaceus ^{a g}
- Telenomus andria ^{g}
- Telenomus angustatus ^{g}
- Telenomus antennalis ^{g}
- Telenomus anthereae ^{a i}
- Telenomus apiarius ^{g}
- Telenomus aporus ^{g}
- Telenomus aradi ^{g}
- Telenomus arcanus ^{g}
- Telenomus argus ^{g}
- Telenomus arzamae ^{g}
- Telenomus asperus ^{g}
- Telenomus ater ^{g}
- Telenomus athanasowi ^{g}
- Telenomus atomus ^{g}
- Telenomus atratus ^{a i}
- Telenomus australis ^{a i}
- Telenomus autumnalis ^{g}
- Telenomus bakeri ^{g}
- Telenomus bambusae ^{g}
- Telenomus basandzhabi ^{g}
- Telenomus beatus ^{a i}
- Telenomus beneficiens ^{g}
- Telenomus bifidus ^{g}
- Telenomus bipunctata ^{g}
- Telenomus brachialis ^{g}
- Telenomus brachypteru ^{g}
- Telenomus brevis ^{g}
- Telenomus bucephalus ^{g}
- Telenomus busseolae ^{g}
- Telenomus californicu ^{g}
- Telenomus californicus ^{i}
- Telenomus carbonarius ^{g}
- Telenomus carnifex ^{a i}
- Telenomus catalpae ^{g}
- Telenomus cebes ^{g}
- Telenomus chandishae ^{g}
- Telenomus chloropus ^{g}
- Telenomus chrysopae ^{g}
- Telenomus ciliatus ^{g}
- Telenomus cleostratus ^{g}
- Telenomus clisiocampa ^{g}
- Telenomus clisiocampae ^{i}
- Telenomus coelodasidi ^{g}
- Telenomus coelodasidis ^{i}
- Telenomus coilus ^{g}
- Telenomus coloradensi ^{g}
- Telenomus coloradensis ^{i}
- Telenomus colotes ^{g}
- Telenomus connectans ^{g}
- Telenomus corniger ^{a i}
- Telenomus corticatus ^{g}
- Telenomus crinisacri ^{i}
- Telenomus cyrus ^{g}
- Telenomus dalmani ^{g}
- Telenomus dalmanni ^{w}
- Telenomus danubialis ^{g}
- Telenomus decoratus ^{g}
- Telenomus delicatulus ^{g}
- Telenomus depressigas ^{g}
- Telenomus depressus ^{a g}
- Telenomus despiciendu ^{g}
- Telenomus diemenensis ^{a i}
- Telenomus dignoides ^{g}
- Telenomus dignus ^{g}
- Telenomus dilatus ^{g}
- Telenomus dimmocki ^{g}
- Telenomus dion ^{g}
- Telenomus dissolcus ^{g}
- Telenomus distinctus ^{g}
- Telenomus dolichoceru ^{g}
- Telenomus dolichocerus ^{i}
- Telenomus dorsennus ^{g}
- Telenomus droozi ^{g}
- Telenomus dubius ^{g}
- Telenomus ekadanta ^{g}
- Telenomus elegans ^{g}
- Telenomus eleleus ^{a i}
- Telenomus embolicus ^{g}
- Telenomus emersoni ^{a g}
- Telenomus endymion ^{a i}
- Telenomus erdoesi ^{g}
- Telenomus eris ^{g}
- Telenomus eteocles ^{a i}
- Telenomus etiellae ^{g}
- Telenomus eumicrosmoi ^{g}
- Telenomus eumicrosomo ^{g}
- Telenomus euproctidis ^{g}
- Telenomus eximus ^{a i}
- Telenomus exsertus ^{a i}
- Telenomus fasciatus ^{g}
- Telenomus ferganae ^{g}
- Telenomus fergussoni ^{g}
- Telenomus fimbriatus ^{g}
- Telenomus flavescens ^{i}
- Telenomus flavinervus ^{a i}
- Telenomus flavipes ^{g}
- Telenomus floridanus ^{g}
- Telenomus fodori ^{g}
- Telenomus frenchi ^{a i}
- Telenomus fulmeki ^{g}
- Telenomus geometrae ^{g}
- Telenomus giraulti ^{a i}
- Telenomus gloriosus ^{a i}
- Telenomus gnophaelae ^{g}
- Telenomus goniopis ^{g}
- Telenomus goniopsis ^{g}
- Telenomus gossypiicol ^{g}
- Telenomus gossypiicola ^{i}
- Telenomus gracilicorn ^{g}
- Telenomus gracilicornis ^{i}
- Telenomus graptae ^{g}
- Telenomus grenadensis ^{g}
- Telenomus guancheri ^{g}
- Telenomus hackeri ^{a i}
- Telenomus harpyiae ^{g}
- Telenomus hayagriva ^{g}
- Telenomus heliodorus ^{g}
- Telenomus heliothidis ^{g}
- Telenomus hemipterus ^{g}
- Telenomus heracleicol ^{g}
- Telenomus heracleicola ^{i}
- Telenomus heteropteru ^{g}
- Telenomus heydeni ^{g}
- Telenomus hilli ^{a i}
- Telenomus hofmanni ^{g}
- Telenomus homopterae ^{g}
- Telenomus horus ^{g}
- Telenomus hubbardi ^{g}
- Telenomus hullensis ^{g}
- Telenomus hungaricus ^{g}
- Telenomus hyalinatus ^{g}
- Telenomus hydroeciae ^{g}
- Telenomus hysteropter ^{g}
- Telenomus iapyx ^{a g}
- Telenomus ichthyurae ^{g}
- Telenomus ilione ^{g}
- Telenomus impressor ^{g}
- Telenomus impressus ^{g}
- Telenomus incisus ^{g}
- Telenomus infuscatipe ^{g}
- Telenomus infuscatipes ^{i}
- Telenomus jugoslavicu ^{g}
- Telenomus kanthaka ^{g}
- Telenomus koebelei ^{g}
- Telenomus kolbei ^{g}
- Telenomus kurenzovi ^{g}
- Telenomus laeviceps ^{g}
- Telenomus laeviscutel ^{g}
- Telenomus laeviusculu ^{g}
- Telenomus laricis ^{g}
- Telenomus laticeps ^{a i}
- Telenomus lauri ^{g}
- Telenomus lavernae ^{g}
- Telenomus leai ^{a i}
- Telenomus lineolatus ^{g}
- Telenomus longiabdomi ^{g}
- Telenomus longiceps ^{g}
- Telenomus longicornis ^{g}
- Telenomus longicorpus ^{a i}
- Telenomus longifunicu ^{g}
- Telenomus longipennis ^{a i}
- Telenomus longistriat ^{g}
- Telenomus longulatus ^{g}
- Telenomus longulus ^{g}
- Telenomus lopicida ^{g}
- Telenomus lucullus ^{g}
- Telenomus macroceps ^{g}
- Telenomus macrurus ^{g}
- Telenomus maculatus ^{g}
- Telenomus maculipenni ^{g}
- Telenomus maculipennis ^{i}
- Telenomus magniclavatus ^{a i}
- Telenomus majorosi ^{g}
- Telenomus marruzae ^{g}
- Telenomus mataieaensi ^{g}
- Telenomus mentes ^{g}
- Telenomus meridianus ^{g}
- Telenomus microceps ^{g}
- Telenomus microclavat ^{g}
- Telenomus minimus ^{g}
- Telenomus minutus ^{g}
- Telenomus mitsukurii ^{g}
- Telenomus moczari ^{g}
- Telenomus montanus ^{a i}
- Telenomus moricolus ^{g}
- Telenomus mumfordi ^{g}
- Telenomus nauplius ^{g}
- Telenomus nawai ^{g}
- Telenomus necopinatus ^{i}
- Telenomus nelsonensis ^{a i}
- Telenomus niger ^{a i}
- Telenomus nigricorpus ^{a i}
- Telenomus nigriscapsu ^{g}
- Telenomus nigriscapsus ^{i}
- Telenomus nitidulus ^{g}
- Telenomus noctuae ^{g}
- Telenomus nomas ^{g}
- Telenomus nysivorus ^{g}
- Telenomus obscuripes ^{g}
- Telenomus ocellatus ^{g}
- Telenomus ocnus ^{a i}
- Telenomus odyssea ^{a i}
- Telenomus oeagrus ^{a i}
- Telenomus oechalia ^{a i}
- Telenomus oeta ^{a i}
- Telenomus olsenni ^{a i}
- Telenomus oocidus ^{g}
- Telenomus opacus ^{g}
- Telenomus ophion ^{a i}
- Telenomus opis ^{a i}
- Telenomus orithyia ^{a i}
- Telenomus ormenis ^{a i}
- Telenomus orodes ^{a i}
- Telenomus orpheus ^{a i}
- Telenomus orphne ^{g}
- Telenomus oryzae ^{g}
- Telenomus osiris ^{a i}
- Telenomus ossa ^{a i}
- Telenomus othonia ^{g}
- Telenomus othus ^{g}
- Telenomus ovivorus ^{g}
- Telenomus ovulorum ^{w}
- Telenomus oxycareni ^{a i}
- Telenomus pallidicornis ^{a i}
- Telenomus pallidipes ^{g}
- Telenomus pallidithorax ^{a i}
- Telenomus pallidiventris ^{a i}
- Telenomus pamphilae ^{g}
- Telenomus paractias ^{g}
- Telenomus paraothus ^{g}
- Telenomus parides ^{g}
- Telenomus parnarae ^{g}
- Telenomus parvulus ^{a i}
- Telenomus pegasus ^{g}
- Telenomus pentatomus ^{g}
- Telenomus penthimiae ^{g}
- Telenomus pentopherae ^{g}
- Telenomus perniciosi ^{g}
- Telenomus perplexus ^{g}
- Telenomus persimilis ^{g}
- Telenomus phalaenarum ^{g}
- Telenomus phylias ^{g}
- Telenomus pilumnus ^{g}
- Telenomus planus ^{a i}
- Telenomus platythorax ^{g}
- Telenomus podisi ^{g}
- Telenomus politus ^{g}
- Telenomus polymorphus ^{g}
- Telenomus poseidon ^{g}
- Telenomus psammicola ^{g}
- Telenomus pseudoclavatus ^{a i}
- Telenomus pseudothus ^{g}
- Telenomus pulcherrimus ^{i}
- Telenomus pulchricornis ^{a i}
- Telenomus punctatissi ^{g}
- Telenomus punctatus ^{a i}
- Telenomus punctigaste ^{g}
- Telenomus punctiventr ^{g}
- Telenomus pusillus ^{g}
- Telenomus quadriclava ^{g}
- Telenomus quaintancei ^{g}
- Telenomus regius ^{g}
- Telenomus remus ^{g}
- Telenomus reynoldsi ^{g}
- Telenomus rhopali ^{g}
- Telenomus rileyi ^{g}
- Telenomus rowani ^{g}
- Telenomus sacchii ^{g}
- Telenomus sechellensi ^{g}
- Telenomus sidneyi ^{a i}
- Telenomus simulans ^{a i}
- Telenomus sitius ^{g}
- Telenomus solutus ^{g}
- Telenomus sphingis ^{g}
- Telenomus spilosomati ^{g}
- Telenomus spilosomatis ^{i}
- Telenomus stenoceps ^{g}
- Telenomus stilpo ^{g}
- Telenomus strelzovi ^{g}
- Telenomus striatulus ^{g}
- Telenomus striatus ^{g}
- Telenomus subaharani ^{g}
- Telenomus sulculus ^{g}
- Telenomus szaboi ^{g}
- Telenomus szelenyii ^{g}
- Telenomus tabanivorus ^{g}
- Telenomus talaus ^{g}
- Telenomus tauricus ^{g}
- Telenomus tenuicornis ^{g}
- Telenomus terebrans ^{g}
- Telenomus testaceus ^{g}
- Telenomus tetratomus ^{g}
- Telenomus texanus ^{g}
- Telenomus thestor ^{g}
- Telenomus transsylvan ^{g}
- Telenomus tritia ^{g}
- Telenomus trophonius ^{g}
- Telenomus truncatus ^{g}
- Telenomus turesis ^{g}
- Telenomus turkarkandu ^{g}
- Telenomus umbripennis ^{g}
- Telenomus vernaculus ^{g}
- Telenomus vernicosus ^{g}
- Telenomus vibius ^{g}
- Telenomus viggianii ^{g}
- Telenomus vinicius ^{g}
- Telenomus violaceus ^{g}
- Telenomus violentus ^{g}
- Telenomus vulcanus ^{g}
- Telenomus wilsoni ^{i}
- Telenomus wullschlege ^{g}
- Telenomus xeneus ^{g}
- Telenomus zygaenae ^{g}

a = AFD, i=IRMNG, g=GBIF, w=Insecta.
