= Scelio punctaticeps =

Scientific classification
- Domain: Eukaryota
- Kingdom: Animalia
- Phylum: Arthropoda
- Class: Insecta
- Order: Hymenoptera
- Family: Scelionidae
- Genus: Scelio
- Species: S. punctaticeps

Binomial name
- Scelio punctaticeps Dodd, 1914

Species of parasitoid wasp

Scelio punctaticeps is a species of parasitoid wasp in the subfamily, Scelioninae, and was first described in 1914 by Alan Parkhurst Dodd.

The holotype was collected in Cairns, Queensland.
