= Scelio nigricoxa =

Scientific classification
- Domain: Eukaryota
- Kingdom: Animalia
- Phylum: Arthropoda
- Class: Insecta
- Order: Hymenoptera
- Family: Scelionidae
- Genus: Scelio
- Species: S. nigricoxa

Binomial name
- Scelio nigricoxa Dodd, 1914

Species of parasitoid wasp

Scelio nigricoxa is a species of parasitoid wasp in the subfamily, Scelioninae, which was first described in 1914 by Alan Parkhurst Dodd.

The holotype was collected in Gordonvale, Queensland.
