= Habroteleia =

Scientific classification
- Kingdom: Animalia
- Phylum: Arthropoda
- Class: Insecta
- Order: Hymenoptera
- Family: Scelionidae
- Subfamily: Scelioninae
- Genus: Habroteleia; Kieffer

Genus of parasitic wasps

Habroteleia is a genus of parasitic wasps in the family Scelionidae. There are about 9 described species in Habroteleia.

== Species ==
These 9 species are recognized as valid species.

- Habroteleia flavipes Kieffer, 1905
- Habroteleia impressa (Kieffer, 1916)
- Habroteleia mutabilis Chen & Talamas, 2018
- Habroteleia persimilis (Kozlov & Kononova)
- Habroteleia ruficoxa (Kieffer, 1916)
- Habroteleia salebra Chen & Talamas, 2018
- Habroteleia scapularis (Kieffer, 1916)
- Habroteleia soa Chen & Talamas, 2018
- Habroteleia spinosa Chen & Talamas, 2018

== Former species ==
Former species are now described as junior synonyms under following two species.

=== H. flavipes ===
- Habroteleia bharatensis Saraswat, 1978
- Habroteleia browni Crawford, 1910

=== H. persimilis ===
- Habroteleia kotturensis (Sharma, 1981)
- Habroteleia dagavia (Kozlov & Lê, 1995)
