= Habroteleia persimilis =

Scientific classification
- Domain: Eukaryota
- Kingdom: Animalia
- Phylum: Arthropoda
- Class: Insecta
- Order: Hymenoptera
- Family: Scelionidae
- Genus: Habroteleia
- Species: H. persimilis

Binomial name
- Habroteleia persimilis (Kozlov & Kononova, 1985)

Synonyms
- Triteleia persimilis Kozlov & Kononova, 1985; Habroteleia persimilis Kozlov & Kononova, 2008; Triteleia dagavia Kozlov & Lê, 1995

Species of wasp

Habroteleia persimilis, is a species of wasp belonging to the family Platygastridae.

== Distribution ==
It is found in countries such as Japan, China, South Korea and Vietnam.

== Description ==
Female is larger than male. Body length of female is about 4.75–5.18 mm, whereas male is 4.25–4.74 mm. Mesosoma and metasoma are black. Antennae scrobe is punctate rugose to smooth. Central keel present.
