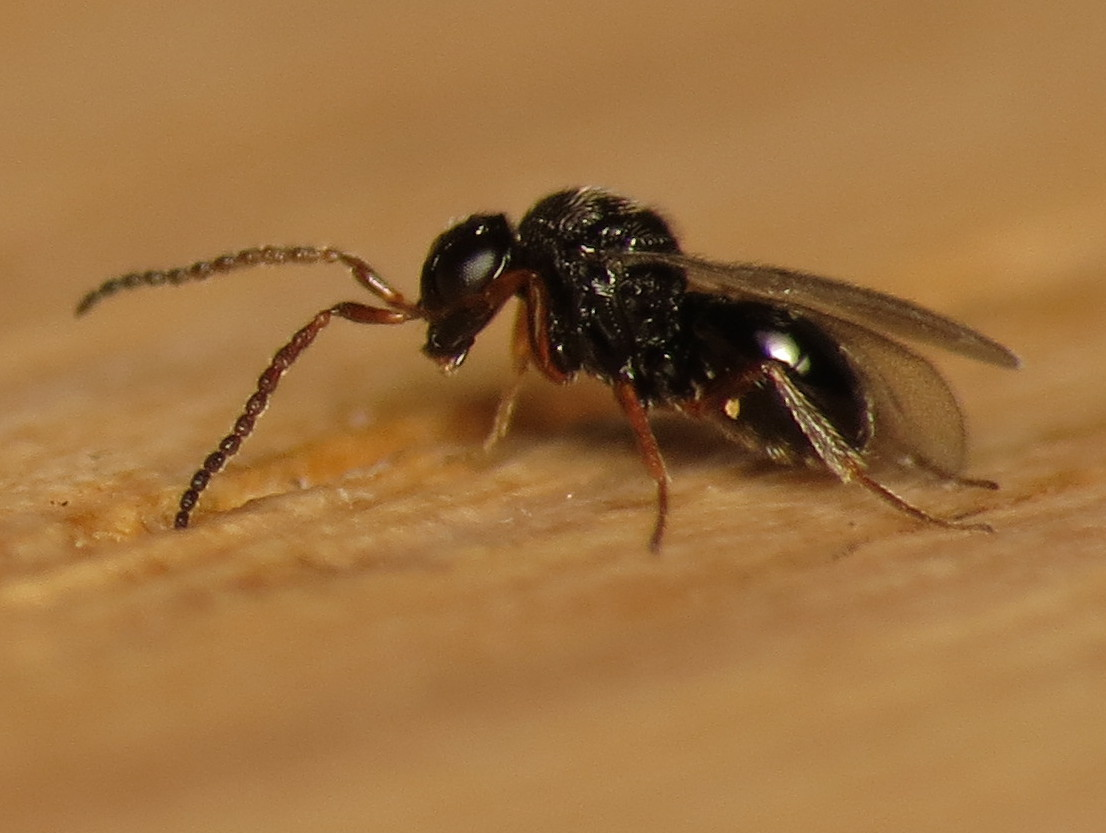

Scientific classification
- Kingdom: Animalia
- Phylum: Arthropoda
- Class: Insecta
- Order: Hymenoptera
- Family: Scelionidae
- Subfamily: Telenominae
- Genus: Trissolcus; Ashmead, 1893

= Trissolcus =

Genus of wasps

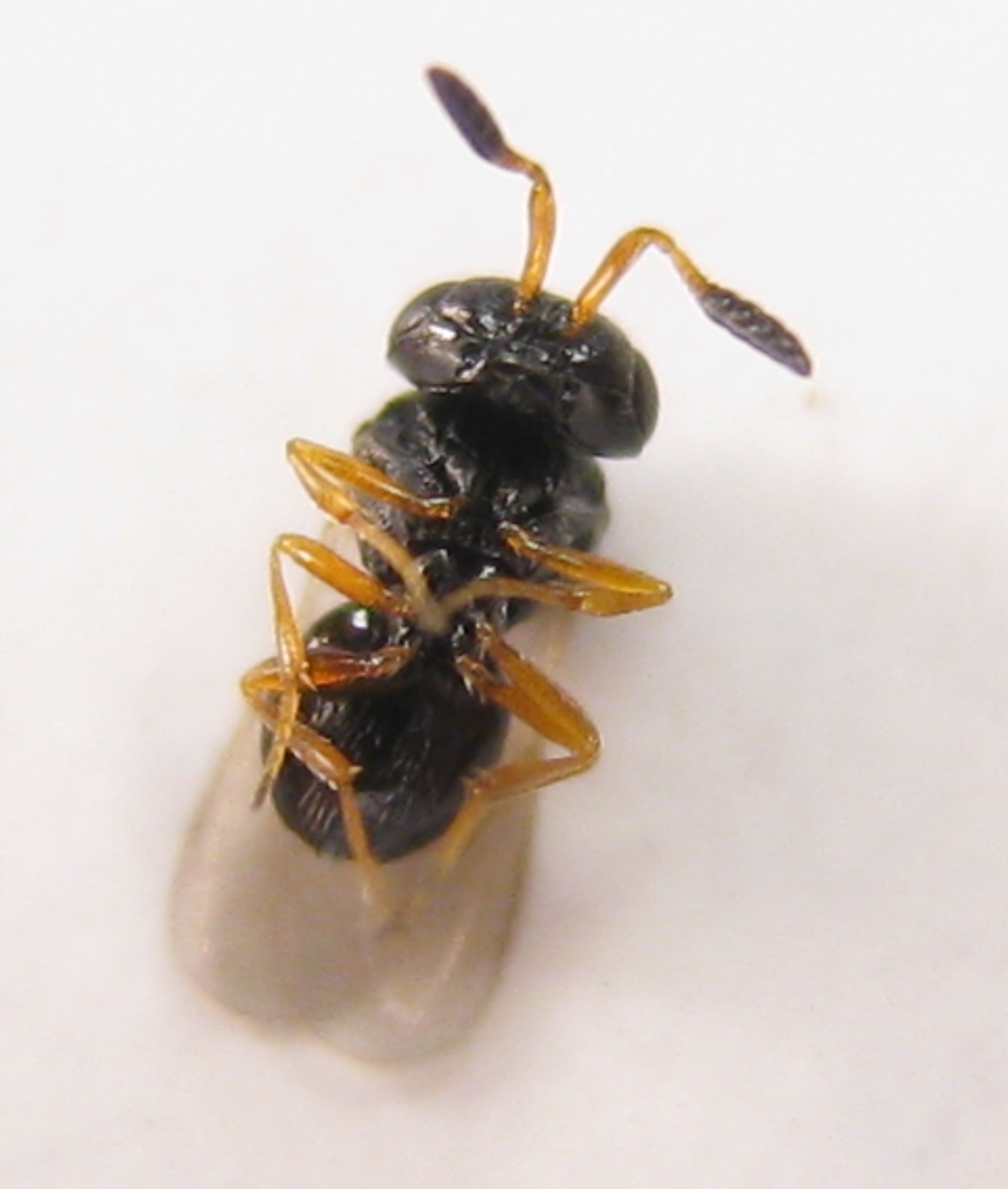
Trissolcus edessae female

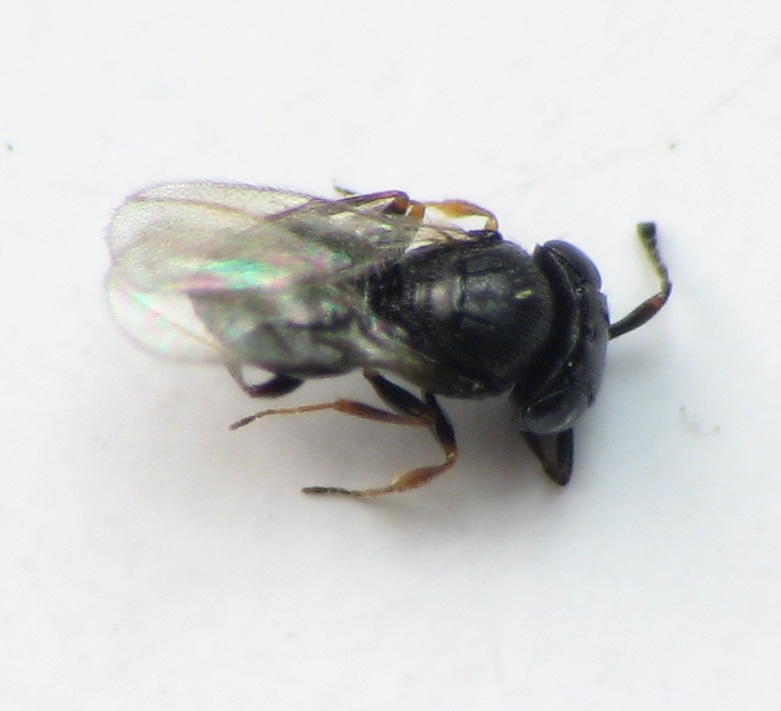
Trissolcus euschisti

Trissolcus is a genus of parasitoid wasps in the family Scelionidae. There are at least 180 described species in Trissolcus. They parasitize eggs of Pentatomomorpha.

== Species ==
These species belong to the genus Trissolcus:

- Trissolcus alpestris (Kieffer, 1909)^{g}
- Trissolcus ancon Johnson, 1991^{g}
- Trissolcus arctatus Johnson, 1991^{i}
- Trissolcus arminon (Walker, 1838)^{g}
- Trissolcus asperlineatus (Mineo & Szabo, 1981)^{g}
- Trissolcus barrowi (Dodd)^{g}
- Trissolcus basalis (Wollaston, 1858)^{c g i}
- Trissolcus belenus (Walker, 1836)^{g}
- Trissolcus biroi (Szabo, 1965)^{g}
- Trissolcus bodkini Crawford^{g}
- Trissolcus brevinotaulus
- Trissolcus brochymenae (Ashmead)^{g b}
- Trissolcus cantus Kozlov & Le, 1977^{g}
- Trissolcus carinifrons Cameron^{g}
- Trissolcus choaspes (Nixon, 1939)^{g}
- Trissolcus circus Kozlov & Le, 1976^{g}
- Trissolcus cirrosus Johnson, 1991^{i}
- Trissolcus cosmopeplae Gahan^{g}
- Trissolcus crypticus Clarke, 1993^{i}
- Trissolcus cultratus Mayr^{g}
- Trissolcus davatchii (Javahery, 1968)^{g}
- Trissolcus discolor (Ratzeburg, 1848)^{g}
- Trissolcus djadetshko (Ryakhovskii, 1959)^{g}
- Trissolcus dryope (Kozlov & Le, 1976)^{g}
- Trissolcus edessae Fouts, 1920^{b}
- Trissolcus eetion (Dodd, 1914)^{i}
- Trissolcus egeria (Dodd, 1914)^{i}
- Trissolcus elasmuchae (Watanabe, 1954)^{g}
- Trissolcus ephyra (Dodd, 1914)^{i}
- Trissolcus eriventus Le^{g}
- Trissolcus euander (Dodd, 1914)^{i}
- Trissolcus eurydemae (Vasiliev, 1915)^{g}
- Trissolcus euschisti (Ashmead, 1893)^{g b}
- Trissolcus evanescens Kieffer, 1904^{g}
- Trissolcus exerrandus Kozlov & Le^{g}
- Trissolcus festivae (Viktorov, 1964)^{g}
- Trissolcus flaviscapus Dodd, 1916^{g i}
- Trissolcus fulmeki (Soyka, 1942)^{g}
- Trissolcus ghorfii (Delucchi & Voegelé, 1961)^{g}
- Trissolcus gonopsidis Watanabe^{g}
- Trissolcus grandis (Thomson, 1860)^{g}
- Trissolcus hullensis Harrington^{g}
- Trissolcus japonicus (Ashmead, 1904)^{g}
- Trissolcus hyalinipennis Rajmohana & Narendran^{g}
- Trissolcus kozlovi Ryakhovskii, 1975^{g}
- Trissolcus lampe (Kozlov & Le, 1976)^{g}
- Trissolcus larides Nixon^{g}
- Trissolcus latisulcus (Crawford, 1913)^{g i}
- Trissolcus leviventris Cameron^{g}
- Trissolcus lodosi (Szabo, 1981)^{g}
- Trissolcus manteroi (Kieffer, 1909)^{g}
- Trissolcus maori Johnson, 1991^{c g i}
- Trissolcus mitsukurii Ashmead^{g i}
- Trissolcus mopsus Nixon^{g}
- Trissolcus oedipus (Dodd, 1913)^{i}
- Trissolcus oeneus (Dodd, 1913)^{i}
- Trissolcus oenone (Dodd, 1913)^{c g i}
- Trissolcus oenopion (Dodd, 1913)^{i}
- Trissolcus ogyges (Dodd, 1913)^{i}
- Trissolcus oobius (Kozlov, 1972)^{g}
- Trissolcus pentatomae (Rondani, 1877)^{g}
- Trissolcus perepelovi Kozlov^{g}
- Trissolcus perrisi (Kieffer, 1906)^{g}
- Trissolcus personatus Johnson, 1991^{g i}
- Trissolcus plautiae Watanabe^{g}
- Trissolcus pseudoturesis (Ryakhovskii, 1959)^{g}
- Trissolcus rufiventris (Mayr, 1907)^{g}
- Trissolcus saakowi Mayr^{g}
- Trissolcus schimitscheki (Szelenyi, 1942)^{g}
- Trissolcus scutellaris (Thomson, 1861)^{g}
- Trissolcus semistriatus (Nees, 1834)^{g}
- Trissolcus simoni (Mayr, 1879)^{g}
- Trissolcus stoicus Nixon^{g}
- Trissolcus strigis Johnson, 1991^{i}
- Trissolcus tersus Le^{g}
- Trissolcus theste (Walker, 1838)^{g}
- Trissolcus trophonius Nixon^{g}
- Trissolcus tumidus (Mayr, 1879)^{g}
- Trissolcus utahensis Ashmead^{g}
- Trissolcus vassilliewi (Mayr, 1879)^{g}
- Trissolcus vesta Kozlov & Le^{g}
- Trissolcus viktorovi Kozlov, 1968^{g}
- Trissolcus vindicius Nixon^{g}
- Trissolcus volgensis (Viktorov, 1964)^{g}
- Trissolcus waloffae (Javahery, 1968)^{g}
- Trissolcus yamagishii Ryu^{g}

Data sources: i = ITIS, c = Catalogue of Life, g = GBIF, b = Bugguide.net i = IRMNG
