= Habroteleia soa =

Scientific classification
- Kingdom: Animalia
- Phylum: Arthropoda
- Clade: Pancrustacea
- Class: Insecta
- Order: Hymenoptera
- Family: Scelionidae
- Genus: Habroteleia
- Species: H. soa

Binomial name
- Habroteleia soa Chen & Talamas, 2018

Species of wasp

Habroteleia soa is a species of wasp that belongs to the family Platygastridae. It is the most geographically disjunct member of the genus, which is separated by other members by the Indian Ocean. It is found in Papua New Guinea and Indonesia.

== Etymology ==
The specific name soa is from the Malagasy word beautiful or excellent.

== Description ==
The females are about 3.72 mm long. Mesosoma and metasoma are black; antennae scrobe smooth and central keel present.
