= Telenomus acares =

Scientific classification
- Domain: Eukaryota
- Kingdom: Animalia
- Phylum: Arthropoda
- Class: Insecta
- Order: Hymenoptera
- Family: Scelionidae
- Genus: Telenomus
- Species: T. acares

Binomial name
- Telenomus acares Johnson, 1984

Synonyms
- Neotelenomus minimus Dodd, 1913

Species of parasitoid wasp

Telenomus acares is species of parasitoid wasp in the subfamily, Telenominae, of the family Scelionidae. It was first described in 1913 as Neotelenomus minimus by Alan Parkhurst Dodd, but in 1984, when it was deemed by N.F. Johnson to belong to the genus, Telenomus, it required a new epithet and was renamed Telenomus acares.

The holotype was collected in Gordonvale, Queensland.
