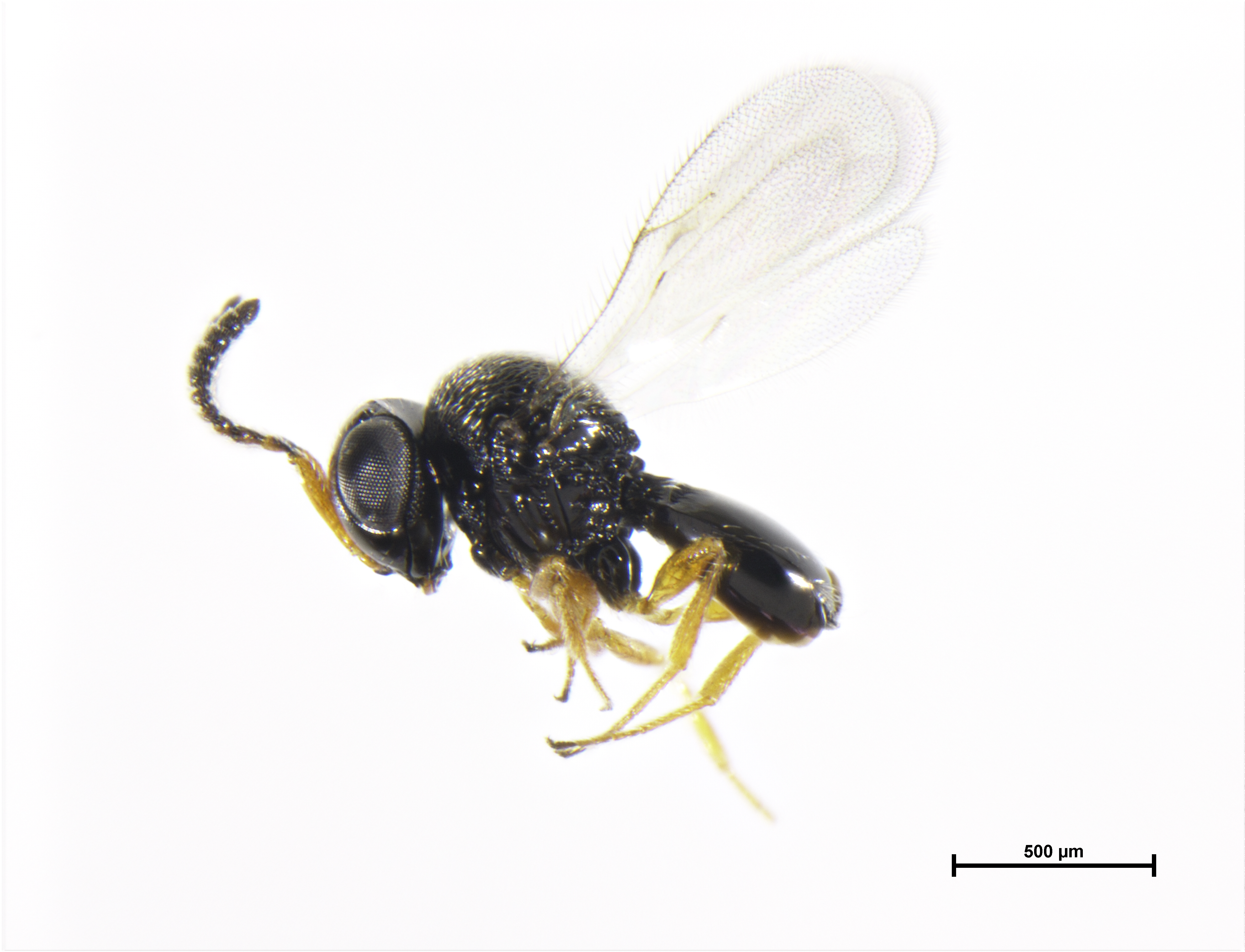
- Lateral view of female T. basalis.

Scientific classification
- Kingdom: Animalia
- Phylum: Arthropoda
- Class: Insecta
- Order: Hymenoptera
- Family: Scelionidae
- Genus: Trissolcus
- Species: T. basalis

Binomial name
- Trissolcus basalis (Wollaston, 1858)

Synonyms
- Telenomus basalis Wollaston, 1858; Microphanurus basalis Wollaston, 1858; Asolcus (Microphanurus) basalis Wollaston, 1858; Asolcus basalis Wollaston, 1858; Telenomus maderensis Wollaston, 1858; Trissolcus maderensis Wollaston, 1858; Telenomus megalocephalus Schulz, 1894; Telenomus megacephalus Ashmead, 1894; Liophanurus megacephalus Ashmead, 1894; Microphanurus megacephalus Ashmead, 1894; Trissolcus megacephalus Ashmead, 1894; Telenomus piceipes Dodd, 1920; Trissolcus piceipes Dodd, 1920; Microphanurus africanus Fouts, 1934; Trissolcus africanus Fouts, 1934; Microphanurus sulmo Nixon, 1938; Asolcus sulmo Nixon, 1938; Trissolcus sulmo Nixon, 1938; Asolcus lodosi Szabó, 1981; Trissolcus lodosi Szabó 1981

= Trissolcus basalis =

Species of wasp

Trissolcus basalis, or the green vegetable bug egg parasitoid, is a parasitoid wasp in the family Platygastridae known primarily for parasitising the horticultural pest Nezara viridula, the green vegetable bug.

== Description ==
Like other species of Trissolcus, T. basalis is small (around 2mm long), mostly black in colour, and females have clubbed antennae. Trissolcus basalis can be separated from other nearctic Trissolcus species by the presence of coriaceous microsculpture on the mesoscutellum, pustulate setal bases, shallowly impressed episternal foveae on the mesopleuron, and an incomplete netrion sulcus.

== Life cycle ==
Trissolcus basalis is a solitary endoparasitoid, completing development within the eggs of pentatomid bugs. Females use their clubbed-shape antennae to palpate eggs laid by their primary host, Nezara viridula. When ready to oviposit, the female faces away from the egg and backs into it, inserting her ovipositor through the wall of the egg. Once finished ovipositing, the female withdraws her ovipositor and wipes the tip across the egg surface to mark the egg also with pheromones. Female wasps defend the eggs they have already parasitized. After adults have completed development, males emerge from unfertilized eggs first followed by females a couple of days later. Males mate with females as they emerge from the egg.

== Ecology ==
In New Zealand, T. basalis has been recorded from non-target hosts including Cermatulus nasalis (Woodward, 1837), Cuspicona simplex Walker, 1867, Green potato bug, Dictyotus caenosus (Westwood, 1837), Glaucias amyoti (Dallas, 1851), Monteithiella humeralis (Walker, 1868), and Oechalia schellenbergii (Guerin, 1831). It has no known natural enemies in New Zealand, although Acroclisoides, a genus containing a species known to hyperparasitise T. basalis in Australia, is known to be present in New Zealand.

== Distribution ==
Trissolcus basalis is considered to be an effective biocontrol agent in New Zealand, Australia, and the United States as well as in middleuropean countries, all places where it was deliberately introduced. In 1949 T. basalis was released in New Zealand in an effort to control damage caused to crops including sweet corn and green beans by Nezara viridula. Over 48,000 parasitoids were reared from a shipment of between 200 and 300, and these were released at Awanui, Kaitaia, Paihia, Kawakawa, Whangarei, New Plymouth and Te Kaha (Bay of Plenty).
