= Calliscelio elegans =

Scientific classification
- Domain: Eukaryota
- Kingdom: Animalia
- Phylum: Arthropoda
- Class: Insecta
- Order: Hymenoptera
- Family: Scelionidae
- Genus: Calliscelio
- Species: C. elegans

Binomial name
- Calliscelio elegans (Perkins, 1910)

Synonyms
- Caloteleia elegans Perkins, 1910; Caenoteleia elegans (Perkins, 1910); Calotelea tanugatra Narendran, 1998

Species of wasp

Calliscelio elegans is a species of parasitoid wasp in the family Scelionidae.

== Biology ==
Although no specific host record is published to date, it is suspected that C. elegans parasitizes the eggs of Gryllidae species, as is the case in C. teleogrylli. In Nepal, C. elegans occurs up to 2000 m of elevation.

== Distribution ==
The species is widespread throughout the tropics, but is always relatively rare. It is considered an adventive species, accidentally introduced in many regions of the world. Calliscelio elegans is reported to occur in Benin, Ivory Coast, Madagascar, Mauritius, Nigeria and Yemen in the Afrotropical realm, in India, Indonesia, Nepal, Sri Lanka and Thailand in the Indomalayan realm, in Australia, on Christmas Island, Fiji, French Polynesia, Guam and Samoa in the Australasian and Oceanian realms, and in the Americas in Belize, Mexico, Puerto Rico, Venezuela and the United States, where it is recorded from Florida and Hawaii.

== Taxonomy ==
The species was first described in 1910 by British entomologist Robert Cyril Layton Perkins as Caloteleia elegans based on material collected on Oahu in the Hawaiian Islands. In 1926, French entomologist Jean-Jacques Kieffer transferred Calliscelio elegans from its original genus Caloteleia to the newly created monotypic genus Caenoteleia Kieffer, 1926. Later, Caenoteleia was synonymised with Calliscelio, and the species was moved to its current genus combination.
