= Habroteleia mutabilis =

Scientific classification
- Domain: Eukaryota
- Kingdom: Animalia
- Phylum: Arthropoda
- Class: Insecta
- Order: Hymenoptera
- Family: Scelionidae
- Genus: Habroteleia
- Species: H. mutabilis

Binomial name
- Habroteleia mutabilis Chen & Talamas, 2018

Species of wasp

Habroteleia mutabilis, is a species of wasp belonging to the family Platygastridae. It is described from Fiji.

== Description ==
Female is slightly larger than male. Body length of female is about 3.60–3.74 mm, whereas male is 3.36–3.72 mm. Mesosoma blackish to orange in color. Metasoma are blackish to eorange with dark brown to black patches. Antennae scrobe foveate. Central keel absent.
