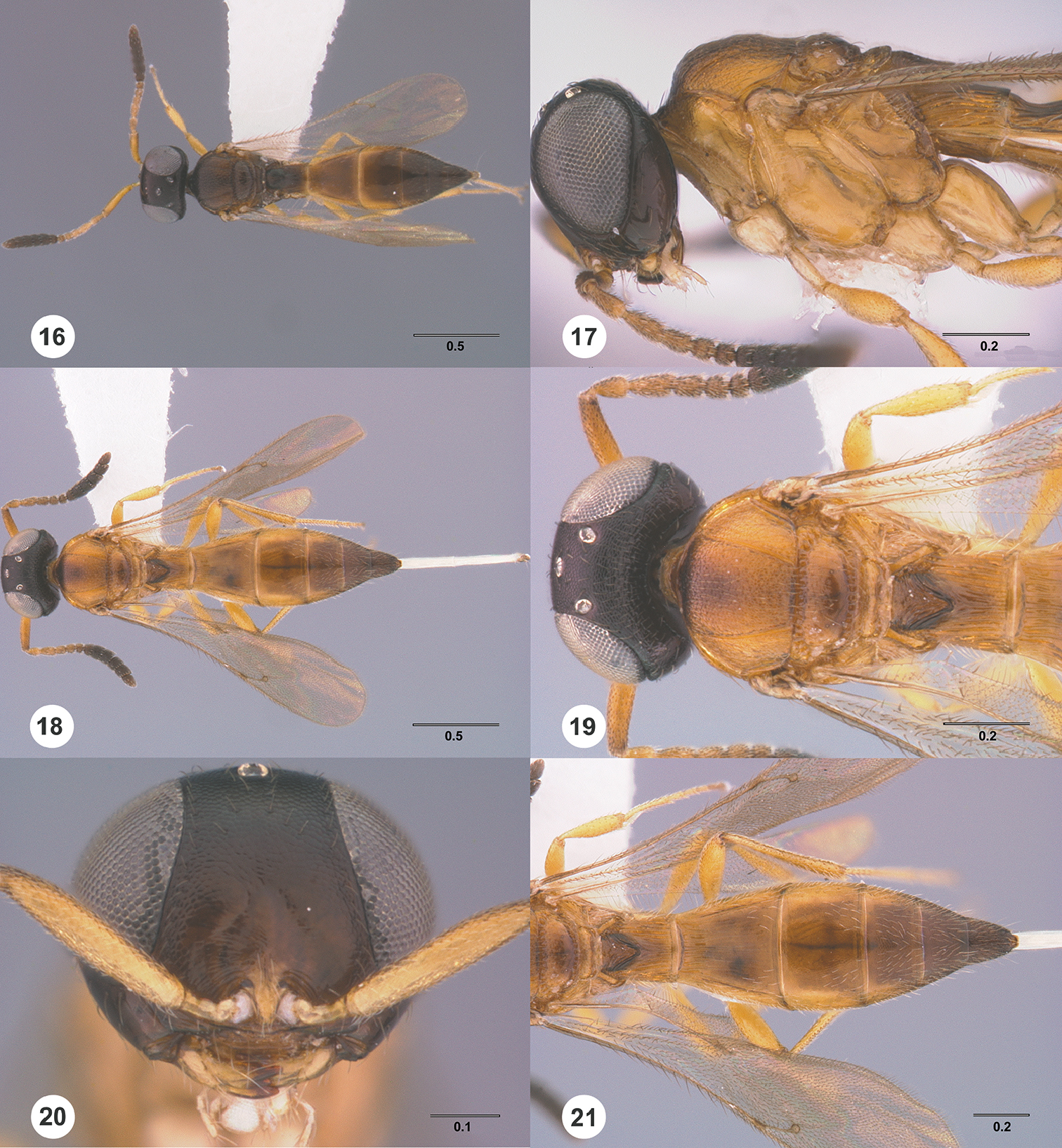
- Calliscelio absconditum

Scientific classification
- Kingdom: Animalia
- Phylum: Arthropoda
- Class: Insecta
- Order: Hymenoptera
- Family: Scelionidae
- Subfamily: Scelioninae
- Genus: Calliscelio; Ashmead, 1893

Synonyms
- Caenoteleia Kieffer, 1926

= Calliscelio =

Genus of wasps

Calliscelio is a parasitoid wasp genus in the family Scelionidae with currently 97 described species worldwide.

== Species ==
- Calliscelio absconditum Chen & Johnson, 2017
- Calliscelio absum Chen & Johnson, 2017
- Calliscelio agaliensis Narendran & Ramesh Babu, 1999
- Calliscelio alcoa Chen & Masner, 2017
- Calliscelio amadoi Chen & Johnson, 2017
- Calliscelio aphrodite (Nixon, 1933)
- Calliscelio argentipes (Dodd, 1914)
- Calliscelio armila Chen & Masner, 2017
- Calliscelio australicus (Dodd, 1914)
- Calliscelio basistriatus (Brèthes, 1916)
- Calliscelio bellus (Dodd, 1913)
- Calliscelio benoiti (Risbec, 1958)
- Calliscelio bidens Chen & Masner, 2017
- Calliscelio bisulcatus (Kieffer, 1910)
- Calliscelio brachys Chen & Johnson, 2017
- Calliscelio brevinotaulus Chen & Johnson, 2017
- Calliscelio brevitas Chen & Johnson, 2017
- Calliscelio brunneus (Dodd, 1913)
- Calliscelio bryani (Fullaway, 1939)
- Calliscelio carinatus Narendran & Ramesh Babu, 1999
- Calliscelio carinigena Chen & Johnson, 2017
- Calliscelio caudatus (Brues, 1940)
- Calliscelio coorgensis Sharma, 1982
- Calliscelio coromandelensis Sharma, 1978
- Calliscelio crater Chen & Johnson, 2017
- Calliscelio crena Chen & Johnson, 2017
- Calliscelio dido Kozlov & Lê, 2000
- Calliscelio dulcis (Dodd, 1914)
- Calliscelio eboris Chen & Johnson, 2017
- Calliscelio elegans (Perkins, 1910)
- Calliscelio emarginatus Narendran & Ramesh Babu, 1999
- Calliscelio erana (Nixon, 1931)
- Calliscelio extenuatus Chen & Johnson, 2017
- Calliscelio exul (Perkins, 1910)
- Calliscelio flavicauda Chen & Johnson, 2017
- Calliscelio flavus (Dodd, 1913)
- Calliscelio foveolatus Chen & Johnson, 2017
- Calliscelio galliphilus (Risbec, 1953)
- Calliscelio gatineau Chen & Johnson, 2017
- Calliscelio glaber Chen & Masner, 2017
- Calliscelio gracilis (Nixon, 1931)
- Calliscelio granulatus Chen & Masner, 2017
- Calliscelio grenadensis (Ashmead, 1896)
- Calliscelio hubo Kozlov & Lê, 2000
- Calliscelio indicus Narendran & Ramesh Babu, 1999
- Calliscelio laticinctus Ashmead, 1893
- Calliscelio latifrons Chen & Johnson, 2017
- Calliscelio leucosius (Nixon, 1931)
- Calliscelio levis Chen & Johnson, 2017
- Calliscelio longicarinatus Narendran & Ramesh Babu, 1999
- Calliscelio longius Chen & Johnson, 2017
- Calliscelio lugens (Kieffer, 1910)
- Calliscelio luteipes (Kieffer, 1914)
- Calliscelio magnificus Chen & Masner, 2017
- Calliscelio malabaricus Narendran & Ramesh Babu, 1999
- Calliscelio marlattii (Ashmead, 1893)
- Calliscelio mediterraneus (Kieffer, 1910)
- Calliscelio melanocephalus (Fullaway, 1939)
- Calliscelio mellicolor (Nixon, 1931)
- Calliscelio migma Chen & Johnson, 2017
- Calliscelio minutia Chen & Johnson, 2017
- Calliscelio mirabilis Kozlov & Kononova, 1985
- Calliscelio niger (Fullaway, 1939)
- Calliscelio orientalis Sharma, 1982
- Calliscelio pallidus (Kieffer, 1917)
- Calliscelio paraglaber Chen & Johnson, 2017
- Calliscelio pararemigio Chen & Masner, 2017
- Calliscelio paulisiensis (Risbec, 1958)
- Calliscelio perpulcher (Dodd, 1915)
- Calliscelio peterseni Buhl, 1998
- Calliscelio peyerimhoffi (Kieffer, 1906)
- Calliscelio philippinensis Kieffer, 1913
- Calliscelio prolepticus (Brues, 1940)
- Calliscelio prolixus Chen & Johnson, 2017
- Calliscelio punctatifrons Chen & Johnson, 2017
- Calliscelio remigio Chen & Masner, 2017
- Calliscelio rubriclavus (Ashmead, 1887)
- Calliscelio ruficollis Kozlov & Kononova, 1985
- Calliscelio ruga Chen & Johnson, 2017
- Calliscelio rugicoxa Chen & Masner, 2017
- Calliscelio savaiiensis (Fullaway, 1939)
- Calliscelio sfina Chen & Johnson, 2017
- Calliscelio storea Chen & Johnson, 2017
- Calliscelio succinophilus (Brues, 1940)
- Calliscelio suni Chen & Johnson, 2017
- Calliscelio swezeyi (Fullaway, 1939)
- Calliscelio teleogrylli Hill, 1983
- Calliscelio telum Chen & Johnson, 2017
- Calliscelio tiro Kozlov & Lê, 2000
- Calliscelio torqueo Chen & Johnson, 2017
- Calliscelio traductus (Brues, 1905)
- Calliscelio upoluensis (Fullaway, 1939)
- Calliscelio urania Kozlov & Kononova, 1985
- Calliscelio urgo Kozlov & Lê, 2000
- Calliscelio variipes (Dodd, 1914)
- Calliscelio virga Chen & Johnson, 2017
- Calliscelio vitilevuensis (Fullaway, 1939)
- Calliscelio wilderi (Fullaway, 1939)
