= Telenomus fariai =

Scientific classification
- Kingdom: Animalia
- Phylum: Arthropoda
- Class: Insecta
- Order: Hymenoptera
- Family: Scelionidae
- Genus: Telenomus
- Species: T. fariai

Binomial name
- Telenomus fariai Haliday, 1833

Species of wasp

Telenomus fariai is a parasitoid wasp in the family Scelionidae that parasitizes various bugs in the genus Triatoma. It was described by Irish entomologist Alexander Henry Haliday in 1833.

== Distribution and habitat ==
Telenomus fariai is found in South America.

== Life cycle ==
Telenomus fariai are solitary wasps and do not form a colony. A wasp lays a larva in an egg of one of its victim species, generally bugs from the genus Triatoma, using an ovipositor. This stops the development of the host egg. The larvae develop for around 30 days before finally hatching from its host egg.

The adult T. fariai have a variable life span, no less than 3 days but with the potential of up to 40 days.
