= Habroteleia spinosa =

Scientific classification
- Domain: Eukaryota
- Kingdom: Animalia
- Phylum: Arthropoda
- Class: Insecta
- Order: Hymenoptera
- Family: Scelionidae
- Genus: Habroteleia
- Species: H. spinosa

Binomial name
- Habroteleia spinosa Chen & Johnson, 2018

Species of wasp

Habroteleia spinosa, is a species of wasp belonging to the family Platygastridae. It is described from Papua New Guinea and Indonesia.

== Etymology ==
The specific name spinosa is due to pointed apex of T6 in females.

== Description ==
Male is larger than female. Body length of female is about 3.51–3.52 mm, whereas male is 3.37–3.81 mm. Mesosoma and metasoma are black. Antennae scrobe is punctate rugose. Central keel present.
