= Scelio floridanus =

Scientific classification
- Kingdom: Animalia
- Phylum: Arthropoda
- Class: Insecta
- Order: Hymenoptera
- Family: Scelionidae
- Genus: Scelio
- Species: S. floridanus

Binomial name
- Scelio floridanus Ashmead, 1893

Species of wasp

Scelio floridanus is a species of parasitoid wasp in the family Platygastridae.
