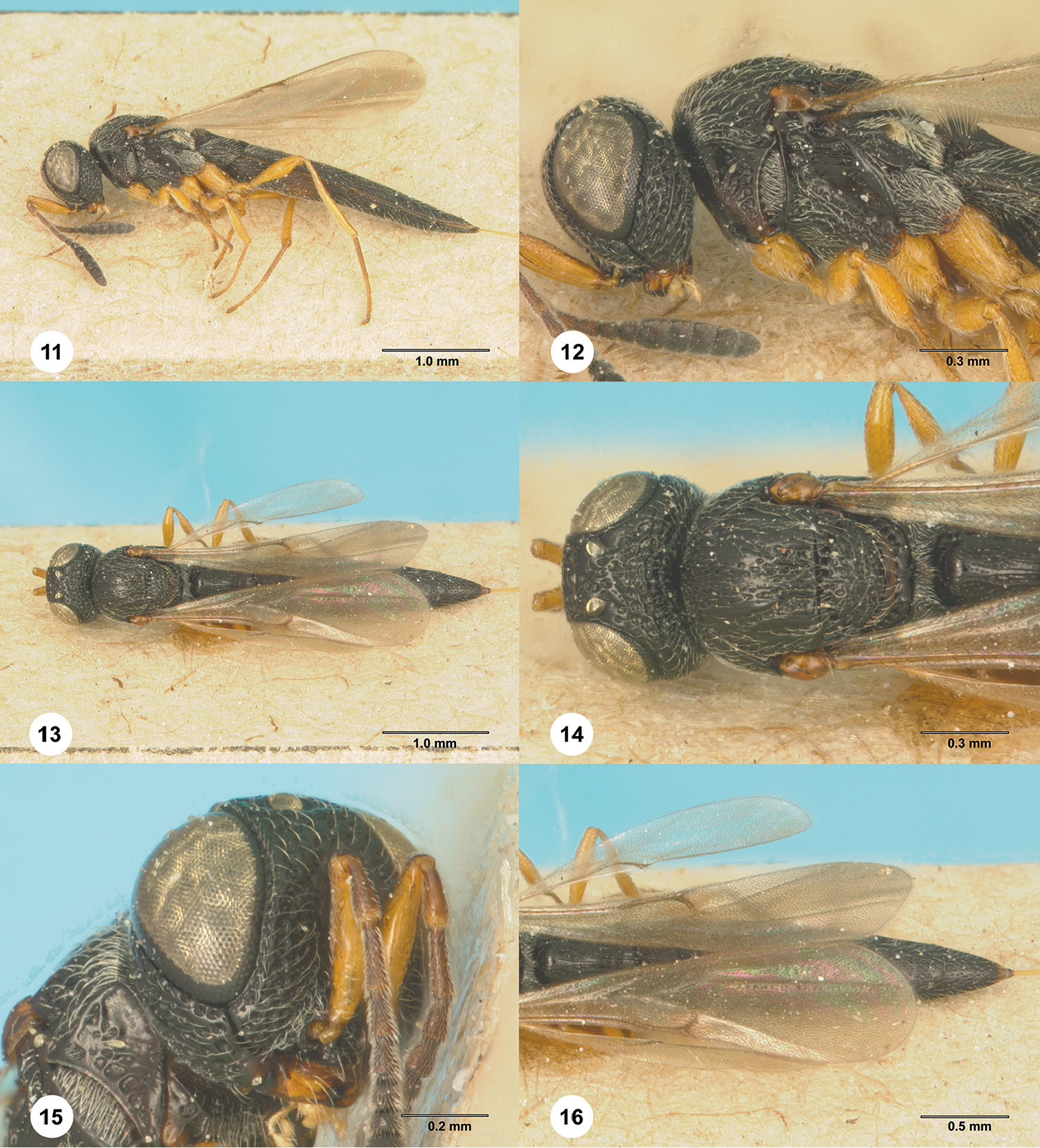

Scientific classification
- Kingdom: Animalia
- Phylum: Arthropoda
- Clade: Pancrustacea
- Class: Insecta
- Order: Hymenoptera
- Family: Scelionidae
- Genus: Habroteleia
- Species: H. flavipes

Binomial name
- Habroteleia flavipes Kieffer, 1905

Synonyms
- Habroteleia browni Crawford, 1910; Chrestoteleia bakeri Kieffer, 1926; Habroteleia bharatensis Saraswat, 1978; Triteleia kotturensis Sharma, 1981; Habroteleia kotturensis Mani and Sharma 1982

= Habroteleia flavipes =

Species of wasp

Habroteleia flavipes, is a species of wasp belonging to the family Platygastridae.

== Distribution ==
It is found throughout South Asian and South East Asian countries such as India, Sri Lanka, Bangladesh, Philippines, Indonesia, Cambodia, Brunei, China, South Korea, Thailand, Vietnam and Malaysia.

== Description ==
Female is larger than male. Body length of female is about 4.36–4.72 mm, whereas male is 4.15–4.52 mm. Mesosoma and metasoma are black. Antennae punctate rugose to smooth. Central keel absent.
