= Habroteleia ruficoxa =

Scientific classification
- Domain: Eukaryota
- Kingdom: Animalia
- Phylum: Arthropoda
- Class: Insecta
- Order: Hymenoptera
- Family: Scelionidae
- Genus: Habroteleia
- Species: H. ruficoxa

Binomial name
- Habroteleia ruficoxa (Kieffer, 1916)

Synonyms
- Phaedroteleia ruficoxa Kieffer, 1916

Species of wasp

Habroteleia ruficoxa, is a species of wasp belonging to the family Platygastridae. It is found in Philippines.

== Description ==
Body length of male is 4.00 mm. Mesosoma and metasoma are black. Antennae scrobe is foveate. Central keel present.
