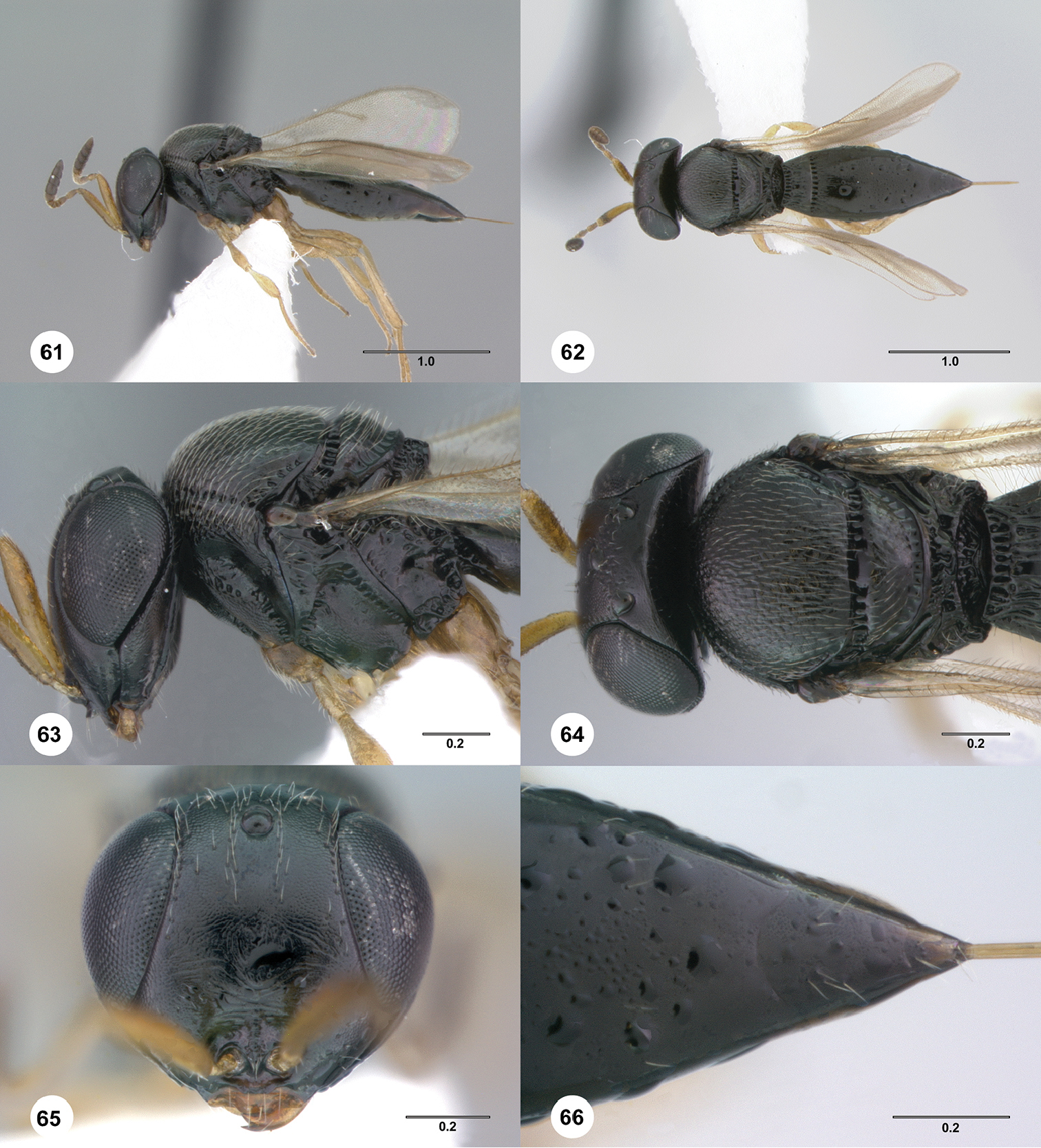

Scientific classification
- Kingdom: Animalia
- Phylum: Arthropoda
- Class: Insecta
- Order: Hymenoptera
- Family: Scelionidae
- Genus: Phanuromyia
- Species: P. odo

Binomial name
- Phanuromyia odo Nesheim, 2017

= Phanuromyia odo =

Species of wasp

Phanuromyia odo is a species of wasp, found in the tropical regions of North, South, and Central America. The wasp is known to have inconsistent physical features, which is why the scientists who discovered this species named it after the Star Trek: Deep Space Nine character Odo, who was popularly known to have shape-shifting abilities.

== Description ==
Phanuromyia odo can grow up to 3mm in length. The insect's hip-bone segment or coxa, and legs are bright yellow in color. The frontal portion of its mesoscutum consists of a wrinkly structure with tiny studded holes, whereas the posterior half has a leather-like and wrinkly texture. The wasp also has a long, flexible, needle-like organ at the rear end of its body called the ovipositor.

== Distribution ==
Specimens of this wasp have been found in: Belize, Bolivia, Brazil, Colombia, Costa Rica, Ecuador, El Salvador, French Guiana, Mexico, and Peru.

== Behavior ==
The scientists who discovered this species believe that Phanuromyia odo are egg parasitoids. These tiny creatures insert their ovipositor into the eggs of other insects, such as planthoppers and lanternflies, and lay a single wasp egg. As the wasp larva continues to grow, it consumes the host's egg from within.
