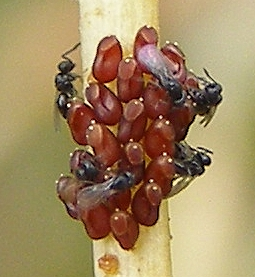
- Telenomus sp. emerging from eggs of Heteroptera, probably Liorhyssus hyalinus (Rhopalidae), laid on Lactuca serriola

Scientific classification
- Kingdom: Animalia
- Phylum: Arthropoda
- Class: Insecta
- Order: Hymenoptera
- Family: Scelionidae
- Subfamily: Telenominae
- Genus: Telenomus; Haliday, 1833

Species
- See text

= Telenomus =

Genus of wasps

Telenomus is a genus of parasitoid wasps belonging to the subfamily Telenominae. The genus was first described by Alexander Henry Haliday in 1833. Species in this genus parasitise the eggs or immature stages of other insects.

Known hosts include: Agrius convolvuli, Amsacta moorei, Bagrada hilaris, Chilo auricilius, Cricula trifenestrata, Eudocima fullonia, Helicoverpa armigera, Helicoverpa punctigera, Helopeltis antonii, Helopeltis theivora, Leptocybe invasa, Orgyia postica, Piezodorus hybneri, and Sahlbergella singularis.

== Species ==
This list is incomplete: See List of Telenomus species.

- Telenomus acares Johnson, 1984
- Telenomus alsophilae Viereck, 1924
- Telenomus arzamae Riley, 1893
- Telenomus bakeri Kieffer, 1906
- Telenomus bifidus Riley, 1887
- Telenomus brachialis Haliday, 1833
- Telenomus californicus Ashmead, 1893
- Telenomus catalpae Muesebeck, 1935
- Telenomus chrysopae Ashmead, 1898
- Telenomus clisiocampae Riley, 1893
- Telenomus coelodasidis Ashmead, 1893
- Telenomus coloradensis Crawford, 1910
- Telenomus dalmani (Ratzeburg, 1844)
- Telenomus dimmocki Ashmead, 1898
- Telenomus dolichocerus (Ashmead, 1887)
- Telenomus emersoni (Girault, 1916)
- Telenomus fariai (Haliday, 1833)
- Telenomus fimbriatus Kieffer, 1904
- Telenomus flavipes (Ashmead, 1893)
- Telenomus floridanus (Ashmead, 1893)
- Telenomus geometrae Ashmead, 1893
- Telenomus gnophaelae Ashmead, 1893
- Telenomus goniopsis Crawford, 1913
- Telenomus gossypiicola Ashmead, 1893
- Telenomus gracilicornis Ashmead, 1893
- Telenomus graptae Howard, 1889
- Telenomus heliothidis Ashmead, 1893
- Telenomus heracleicola Brues, 1906
- Telenomus hubbardi Ashmead, 1893
- Telenomus hullensis Harrington, 1899
- Telenomus ichthyurae Ashmead, 1893
- Telenomus infuscatipes (Ashmead, 1893)
- Telenomus koebelei Ashmead, 1893
- Telenomus lavernae Ashmead, 1893
- Telenomus longicornis Ashmead, 1901
- Telenomus maculipennis Ashmead, 1893
- Telenomus minimus Ashmead, 1893
- Telenomus nigriscapsus Ashmead, 1893
- Telenomus noctuae Ashmead, 1893
- Telenomus opacus (Howard, 1889)
- Telenomus ovivorus (Ashmead, 1893)
- Telenomus pamphilae Ashmead, 1899
- Telenomus pentatomus Kieffer, 1906
- Telenomus perplexus Girault, 1906
- Telenomus persimilis Ashmead, 1893
- Telenomus podisi Ashmead, 1893
- Telenomus pusillus Ashmead, 1893
- Telenomus quaintancei Girault, 1906
- Telenomus remus Nixon, 1937
- Telenomus reynoldsi Gordh and Coker, 1973
- Telenomus rileyi Howard, 1889
- Telenomus sphingis (Ashmead, 1887)
- Telenomus spilosomatis Ashmead, 1893
- Telenomus szelenyii Muesebeck, 1974
- Telenomus tabanivorus (Ashmead, 1895)
- Telenomus tetratomus Kieffer, 1906
- Telenomus texanus Brues, 1902
