= List of Macroteleia species =

This is a list of 130 species in Macroteleia, a genus of parasitoid wasps in the family Platygastridae.

== Macroteleia species ==
- Macroteleia absona Muesebeck, 1977^{i c g}
- Macroteleia acuta Kozlov & Kononova, 1987^{i c g}
- Macroteleia aethiops Nixon, 1931^{i c g}
- Macroteleia africana (Risbec, 1957)^{i c}
- Macroteleia amoena Muesebeck, 1977^{i c g}
- Macroteleia angelovi Petrov, 1994^{i c g}
- Macroteleia antennalis Kieffer, 1917^{i c g}
- Macroteleia arcticosa Galloway, 1978^{i c g}
- Macroteleia atrata Kozlov & Kononova, 1987^{i c g}
- Macroteleia aurea Kozlov & Kononova, 1987^{i c g}
- Macroteleia banksi Muesebeck, 1977^{i c g}
- Macroteleia bicolora Kieffer, 1908^{i c g}
- Macroteleia boriviliensis Saraswat, 1982^{i c g}
- Macroteleia brevigaster Masner, 1976^{i c g}
- Macroteleia bryani Fullaway, 1939^{i c g}
- Macroteleia carinata Ashmead, 1894^{i c g b}
- Macroteleia cavifrons Kieffer, 1914^{i c g}
- Macroteleia cebes Kozlov & Lê, 2000^{i c g}
- Macroteleia chandelii Sharma, 1980^{i c g}
- Macroteleia cleonymoides Westwood, 1835^{i c g}
- Macroteleia compar Muesebeck, 1977^{i c g}
- Macroteleia concinna Muesebeck, 1977^{i c g}
- Macroteleia coracina Muesebeck, 1977^{i c g}
- Macroteleia cornuta Dodd, 1913^{i c g}
- Macroteleia crates Kozlov & Lê, 2000^{i c g}
- Macroteleia crawfordi Kieffer^{g}
- Macroteleia decaryi Risbec, 1950^{i c g}
- Macroteleia demades Kozlov & Lê, 2000^{i c g}
- Macroteleia densa Muesebeck, 1977^{i c g}
- Macroteleia diegoi Risbec, 1956^{i c g}
- Macroteleia discors Muesebeck, 1977^{i c g}
- Macroteleia dolichopa Sharma, 1980^{i c g}
- Macroteleia donaldsoni Galloway, 1978^{i c g}
- Macroteleia dones Kozlov & Lê, 2000^{i c g}
- Macroteleia dores Kozlov & Lê, 2000^{i c g}
- Macroteleia elissa Kozlov & Kononova, 1987^{i c g}
- Macroteleia elongata (Ashmead, 1887)^{i c}
- Macroteleia emarginata Dodd, 1920^{i c g}
- Macroteleia eremicola Priesner, 1951^{i c g}
- Macroteleia erythrogaster Ashmead, 1894^{i c g}
- Macroteleia ethiopica Risbec, 1950^{i c g}
- Macroteleia exilis Muesebeck, 1977^{i c g}
- Macroteleia eximia Muesebeck, 1977^{i c g}
- Macroteleia famelica (Say, 1836)^{i c g}
- Macroteleia flaviceps Kieffer, 1914^{i c g}
- Macroteleia flavigena Kieffer, 1910^{i c g}
- Macroteleia floridana (Ashmead, 1887)^{i c}
- Macroteleia foveolata Muesebeck, 1977^{i c g}
- Macroteleia fugacious Kozlov & Lê, 2000^{i c g}
- Macroteleia goldsmithi Girault, 1920^{i c g}
- Macroteleia gracilicornis Dodd, 1920^{i c g}
- Macroteleia graeffei Kieffer, 1908^{i c g}
- Macroteleia grandis Muesebeck, 1977^{i c g}
- Macroteleia herbigrada Brues, 1915^{i c g}
- Macroteleia hungarica Szabó, 1966^{i c g}
- Macroteleia indica Sharma, 1978^{i c g}
- Macroteleia inermis Fouts, 1930^{i c g}
- Macroteleia insignis Muesebeck, 1977^{i c g}
- Macroteleia insolita Muesebeck, 1977^{i c g}
- Macroteleia insularis (Risbec, 1957)^{i c g}
- Macroteleia laevifrons Kozlov, 1971^{i c g}
- Macroteleia lamba Saraswat, 1978^{i c g}
- Macroteleia lambertoni Kieffer, 1917^{i c g}
- Macroteleia larga Muesebeck, 1977^{i c g}
- Macroteleia liebeli Kieffer, 1917^{i c g}
- Macroteleia ligula Muesebeck, 1977^{i c g}
- Macroteleia linearis Muesebeck, 1977^{i c g}
- Macroteleia livingstoni Saraswat, 1982^{i c g}
- Macroteleia longissima Risbec, 1950^{i c g}
- Macroteleia macrogaster Ashmead, 1893^{i c g}
- Macroteleia magna Dodd, 1913^{i c g}
- Macroteleia mahensis Kieffer, 1910^{i c g}
- Macroteleia manilensis Ashmead, 1905^{i c g}
- Macroteleia minor Kozlov & Kononova, 1987^{i c g}
- Macroteleia mira Muesebeck, 1977^{i c g}
- Macroteleia mongolica Szabó, 1973^{i c g}
- Macroteleia munda Muesebeck, 1977^{i c g}
- Macroteleia nebrija Nixon, 1931^{i c g}
- Macroteleia neomexicana Muesebeck, 1977^{i c g}
- Macroteleia nigra Risbec, 1950^{i c g}
- Macroteleia nitida Kieffer, 1908^{i c g}
- Macroteleia nixoni Masner, 1965^{i c g}
- Macroteleia occipitalis Muesebeck, 1977^{i c g}
- Macroteleia orithyla Nixon, 1931^{i c g}
- Macroteleia pannonica Szabó, 1966^{i c g}
- Macroteleia paraensis Kieffer, 1910^{i c g}
- Macroteleia parilis Muesebeck, 1977^{i c g}
- Macroteleia peliades Kozlov & Lê, 2000^{i c g}
- Macroteleia philippinensis Kieffer, 1913^{i c g}
- Macroteleia pilosa Muesebeck, 1977^{i c g}
- Macroteleia platensis Brèthes, 1916^{i c g}
- Macroteleia pulchritinis Kononova, 1992^{i c g}
- Macroteleia punctatifrons Kieffer, 1917^{i c g}
- Macroteleia punctativentris Kieffer, 1908^{i c g}
- Macroteleia punctifrons Kozlov, 1971^{i c g}
- Macroteleia punctulata Kieffer, 1909^{i c g}
- Macroteleia pustacola Szabó, 1966^{i c g}
- †Macroteleia renatae Szabó & Oehlke, 1986^{i c g f}
- Macroteleia rima Muesebeck, 1977^{i c g}
- Macroteleia rossi Muesebeck, 1977^{i c g}
- Macroteleia rubra (Risbec, 1950)^{i c g}
- Macroteleia rufa Szelényi, 1938^{i c g}
- Macroteleia rufithorax Muesebeck, 1977^{i c g}
- Macroteleia rufiventris (Szabó, 1957)^{i c g}
- Macroteleia rugosa (Provancher, 1881)^{i c g}
- Macroteleia rutila Muesebeck, 1977^{i c g}
- Macroteleia sanctivincenti Ashmead, 1894^{i c g}
- Macroteleia secreta Muesebeck, 1977^{i c g}
- Macroteleia simulans Muesebeck, 1977^{i c g}
- Macroteleia spartinae Muesebeck, 1977^{i c g}
- Macroteleia stabilis Nixon, 1931^{i c g}
- Macroteleia striativentris Crawford, 1910^{i c g}
- Macroteleia subtilis Muesebeck, 1977^{i c g}
- Macroteleia superans Kieffer, 1914^{i c g}
- Macroteleia surfacei Brues, 1907^{i c g}
- Macroteleia terminalis Fouts, 1930^{i c g}
- Macroteleia testaceinerva Cameron, 1904^{i c g}
- Macroteleia testaceipes Kieffer, 1908^{i c g}
- Macroteleia torresia Dodd, 1913^{i c g}
- Macroteleia townsendi Muesebeck, 1977^{i c g}
- Macroteleia triangularis Muesebeck, 1977^{i c g}
- Macroteleia tuberata Kononova & Petrov, 2003^{i c g}
- Macroteleia tutuilana Fullaway, 1939^{i c g}
- Macroteleia unica Muesebeck, 1977^{i c g}
- Macroteleia upoluensis Fullaway, 1939^{i c g}
- Macroteleia variegata Kozlov & Kononova, 1987^{i c g}
- Macroteleia versicolor Kieffer, 1910^{i c g}
- Macroteleia veterna Cockerell, 1921^{i c g}
- Macroteleia virginiensis Ashmead, 1893^{i c g}
- Macroteleia viticola Kononova & Petrov, 2003^{i c g}
- †Macroteleia yaguarum Perrichot & Engel 2014^{f}

Data sources: i = ITIS, c = Catalogue of Life, g = GBIF, b = Bugguide.net, f = Fossilworks.org
