= Macroteleia carinata =

Scientific classification
- Kingdom: Animalia
- Phylum: Arthropoda
- Class: Insecta
- Order: Hymenoptera
- Family: Scelionidae
- Genus: Macroteleia
- Species: M. carinata

Binomial name
- Macroteleia carinata Ashmead, 1894

Species of wasp

Macroteleia carinata is a species of parasitoid wasp in the family Platygastridae.
