= Habroteleia salebra =

Scientific classification
- Domain: Eukaryota
- Kingdom: Animalia
- Phylum: Arthropoda
- Class: Insecta
- Order: Hymenoptera
- Family: Scelionidae
- Genus: Habroteleia
- Species: H. salebra

Binomial name
- Habroteleia salebra Chen & Talamas, 2018

Species of wasp

Habroteleia salebra, is a species of wasp belonging to the family Platygastridae. It is described from Papua New Guinea and Indonesia.

== Description ==
Female is slightly larger than male. Body length of female is about 4.28–4.90 mm, whereas male is 4.30–4.73 mm. Mesosoma and metasoma are black. Antennae scrobe smooth. Central keel absent.
