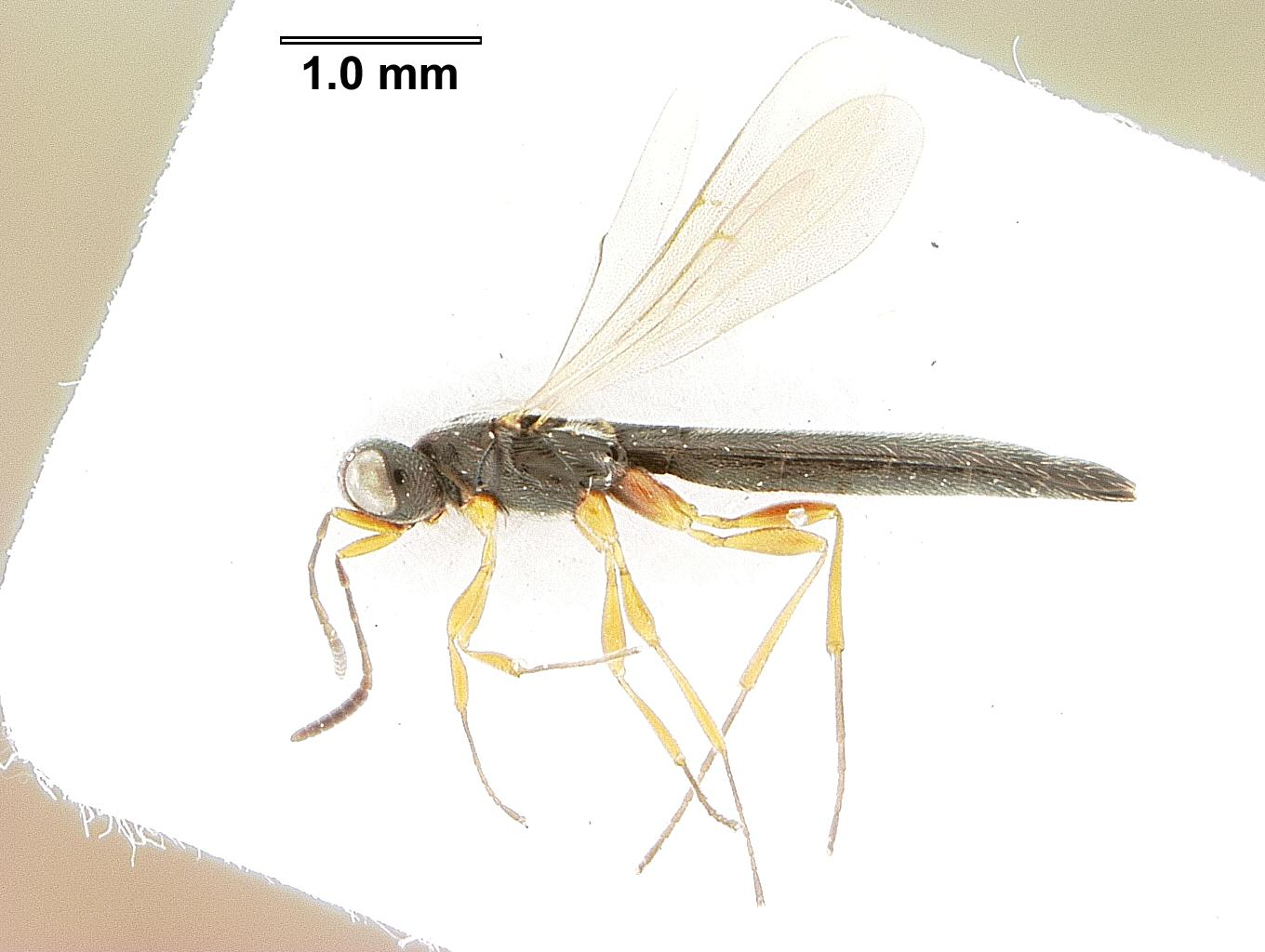

Scientific classification
- Kingdom: Animalia
- Phylum: Arthropoda
- Class: Insecta
- Order: Hymenoptera
- Family: Scelionidae
- Subfamily: Scelioninae
- Genus: Macroteleia; Westwood, 1835

Diversity
- at least 140 species

= Macroteleia =

Genus of wasps

Macroteleia is a genus of parasitoid wasps in the family Platygastridae. There are more than 140 described species in Macroteleia.

== See also ==
- List of Macroteleia species
