= Telenomus remus =

Scientific classification
- Kingdom: Animalia
- Phylum: Arthropoda
- Class: Insecta
- Order: Hymenoptera
- Family: Scelionidae
- Genus: Telenomus
- Species: T. remus

Binomial name
- Telenomus remus Nixon, 1937

Species of wasp

Telenomus remus is a species in the Platygastridae family, native to Sarawak and New Guinea.
