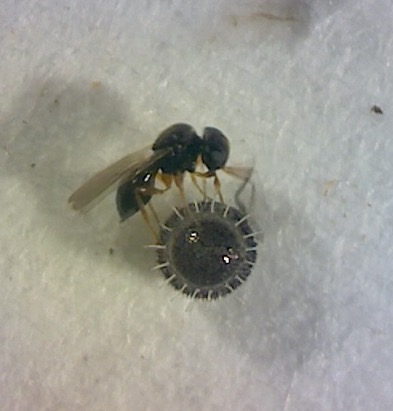
- Telenomus podisi parasiting a Podisus maculiventris egg

Scientific classification
- Kingdom: Animalia
- Phylum: Arthropoda
- Class: Insecta
- Order: Hymenoptera
- Family: Scelionidae
- Genus: Telenomus
- Species: T. podisi

Binomial name
- Telenomus podisi Ashmead, 1893

= Telenomus podisi =

Species of wasp

Telenomus podisi is a species of egg parasitoid wasps described by William Harris Ashmead in 1893 and placed in the family of Platygastridae. It is a parasitoid of the brown stink bug, Euschistus heros and can be raised in labs on the eggs of Cosmopepla lintneriana, Podisus maculiventris, and Euschistus servus. This wasp can be used in integrated pest management to control Euschistus heros. The insecticide Imidacloprid is lethal for these wasps, and other insecticides have been shown to negatively impact rates of egg parasitism.
