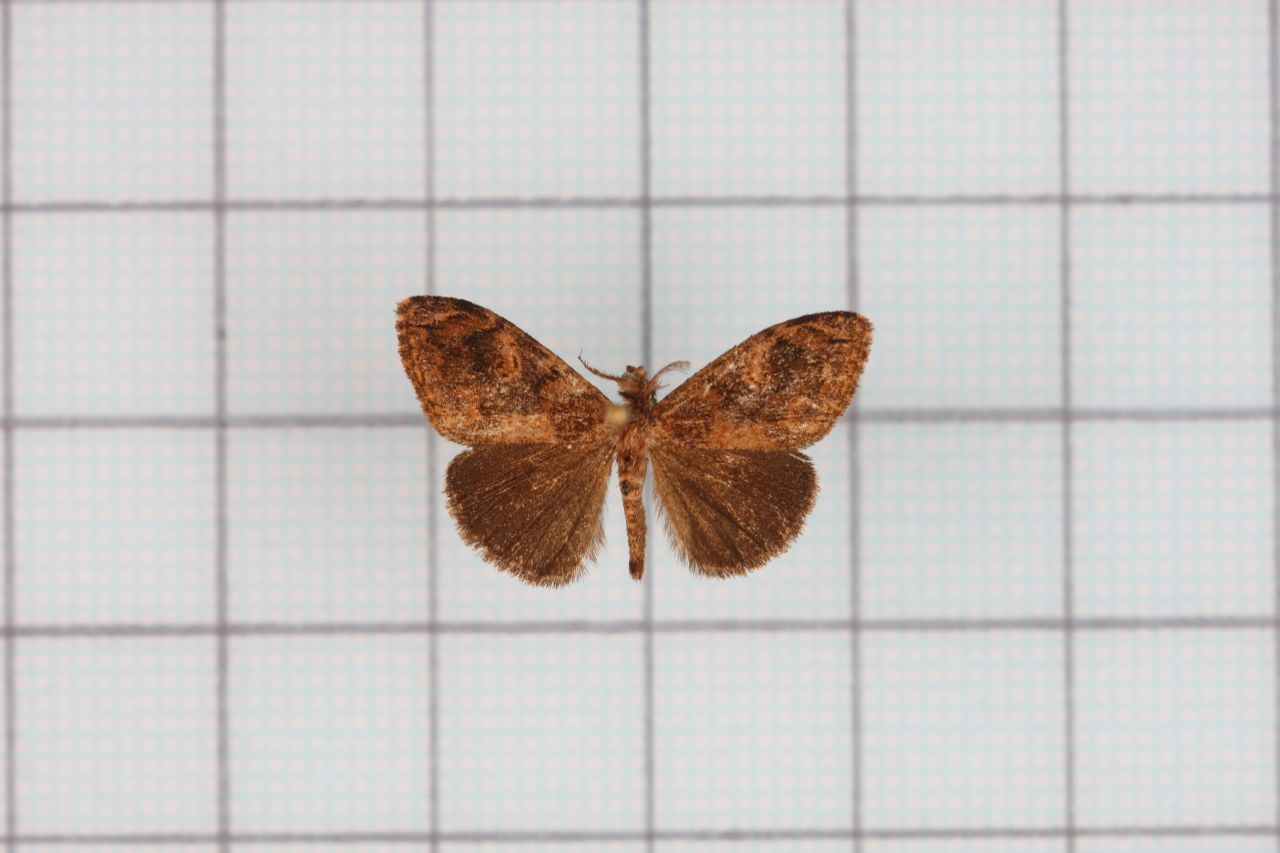

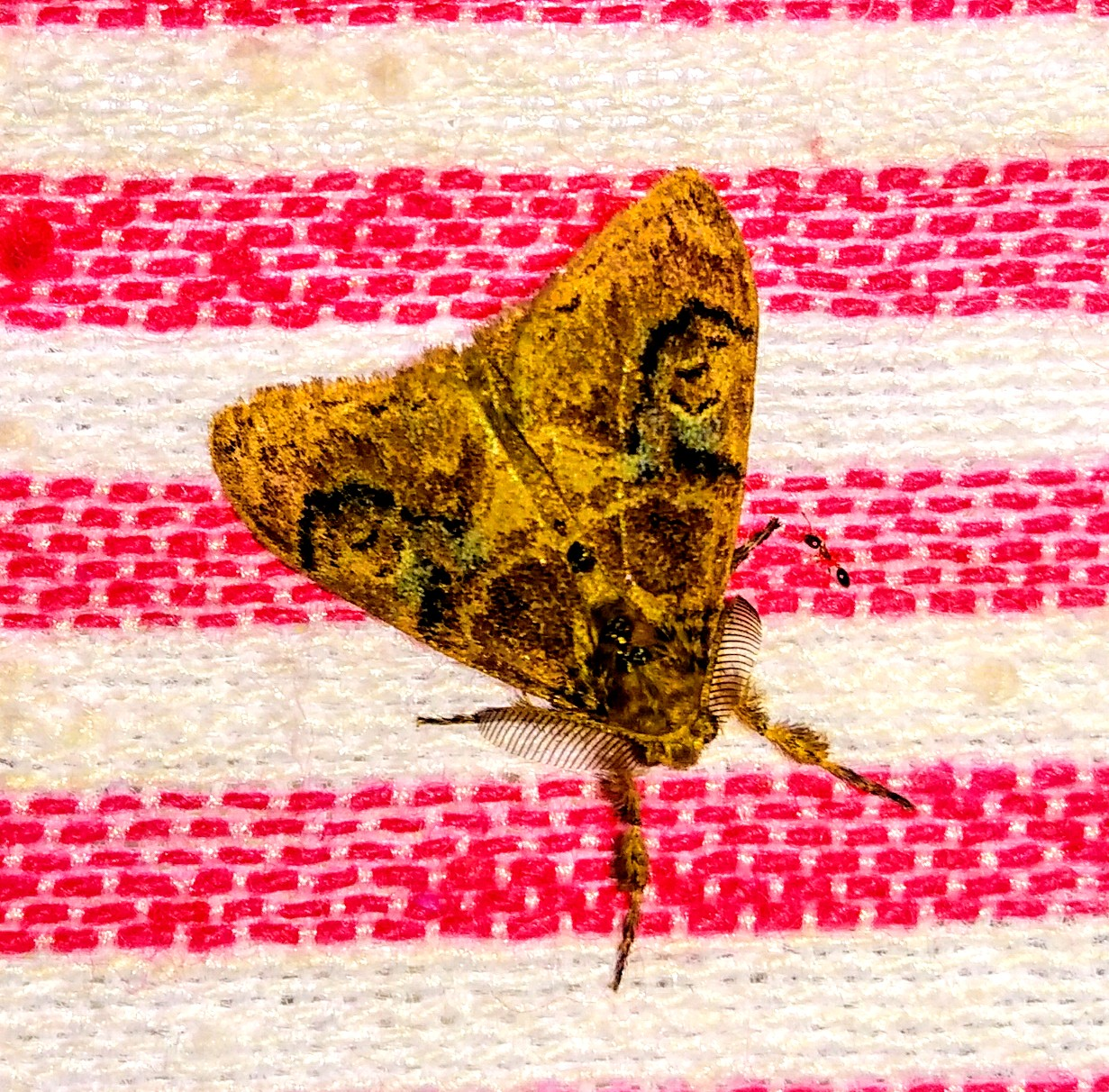

Scientific classification
- Kingdom: Animalia
- Phylum: Arthropoda
- Class: Insecta
- Order: Lepidoptera
- Superfamily: Noctuoidea
- Family: Erebidae
- Genus: Orgyia
- Species: O. postica

Binomial name
- Orgyia postica (Walker, 1855)

Synonyms
- Lacida postica Walker, 1855; Orgyia ceylanica Neitner, 1862; Orgyia nebulosa Walker, 1862; Notolophus nebulosa; Orgyia ludekingii Snellen, 1879; Orgyia ocularis Moore, 1879; Notolophus ocularis

= Orgyia postica =

Species of moth

Orgyia postica, the cocoa tussock moth or hevea tussock moth, is a species of moth of the subfamily Lymantriinae of the family Erebidae found in the Oriental tropics of India, Sri Lanka, Myanmar, Borneo, Java, New Guinea, and Taiwan. It was described by Francis Walker in 1855.

== Description ==
The wingspan is 20–30 mm for males. In the male, the head, thorax, and abdomen are brownish. Forewings are brown with an indistinct oblique sub-basal line. Waved antemedial and postmedial lines approach each other at the lower angle of the cell. The area between them is slightly tinged with bluish grey and has a waved dark line edged with white on each side of the discocellulars. Two indistinct, waved submarginal lines are present. The apex is slightly tinged with grey and has some subapical dark streaks. Hindwings are dark brown. The female is wingless.

Larvae are yellowish and clothed sparsely with brown hair. One dorsal and two lateral brown bands are seen. Paired tufts of hair are on the first and eleventh somites, projecting forward and backward. Lateral tufts of grey hair project from the fourth and fifth somites. Dorsal tufts of yellow hair are on the fourth to seventh somites. The head is red. The pupa is stout; in males, it is glossy black, with numerous short, small tufts of hair. Eggs are pillbox-shaped and pale whitish brown, with a darker ring encircling a depressed top.

== Ecology ==
Adult males are on the wing year-round. The name Orgyia is because the larvae have been recorded on a wide range of species, including Buchanania, Mangifera, Durio, Ochroma, Casuarina, Terminalia, Shorea, Hevea, Ricinus, Pelargonium, Cinnamomum, Acacia, Albizia, Caesalpinia, Cajanus, Cassia, Dalbergia, Erythrina, Pithecellobium, Pterocarpus, Sesbania, Xylia, Lagerstroemia, Eucalyptus, Tristania, Zizyphus, Malus, Coffea, Citrus, Santalum, Dimocarpus, Litchi, Nephelium, Theobroma, Camellia, Grewia, and Tectona.

The parasitoid wasps of Telenomus are known to attack the eggs of this moth.
