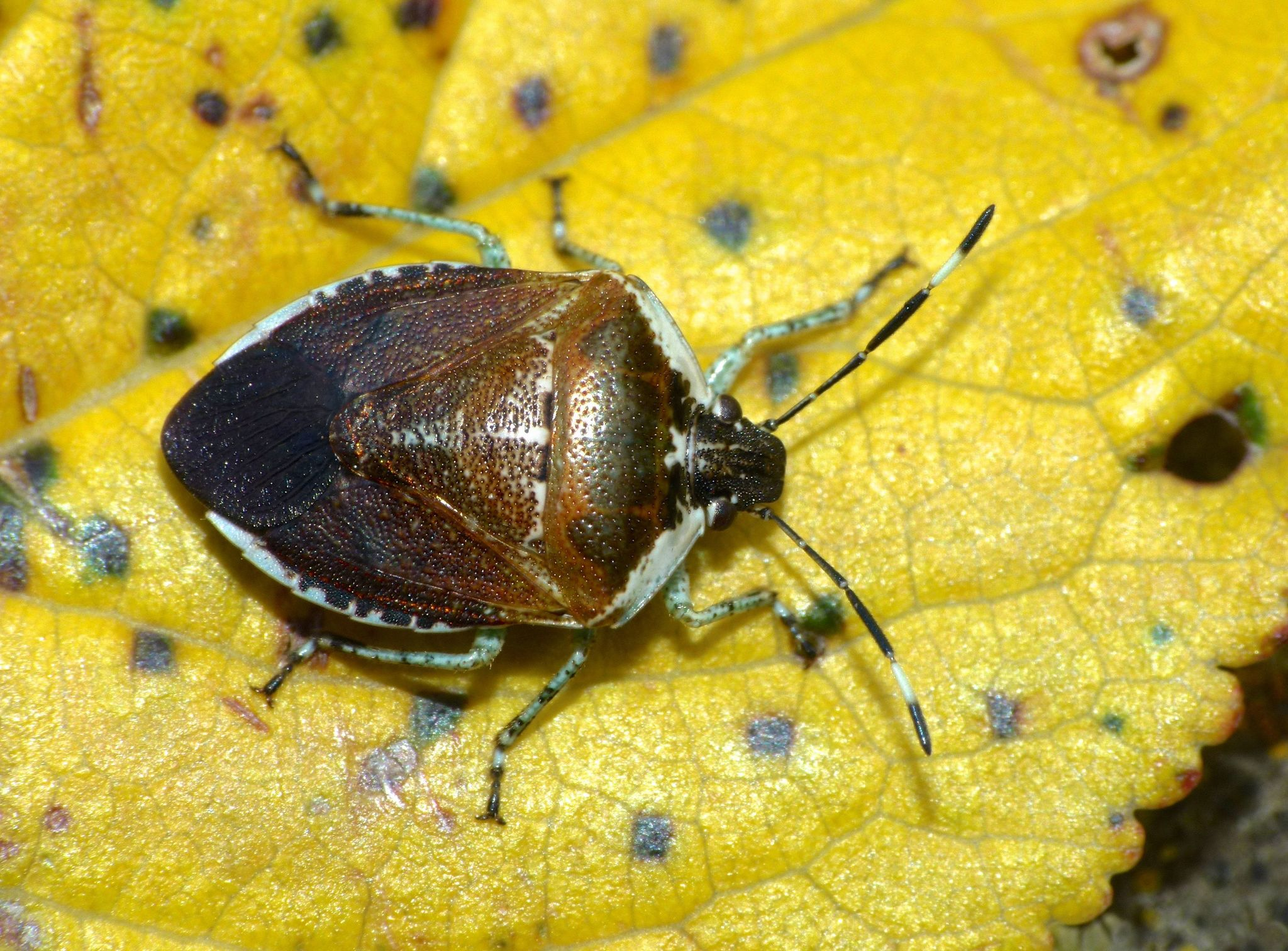
- Dorsal view of Monteithiella humeralis on Pittosporum leaf

Scientific classification
- Kingdom: Animalia
- Phylum: Arthropoda
- Class: Insecta
- Order: Hemiptera
- Suborder: Heteroptera
- Family: Pentatomidae
- Subfamily: Pentatominae
- Tribe: Carpocorini
- Genus: Monteithiella
- Species: M. humeralis

Binomial name
- Monteithiella humeralis Walker, 1868

Synonyms
- Strachia humeralis Walker, F. 1868; Pentatoma pallipes Dallas, W.S. 1851; Antestia orbona Kirkaldy, G.W. 1909

= Monteithiella humeralis =

Species of shield bug of the family Pentatomidae

Monteithiella humeralis, commonly known as the pittosporum shield bug is a species of herbivorous shield bug native to Australia and introduced in New Zealand. It is the only species of the genus Monteithiella, making Monteithiella a monotypic taxon. As its common name suggests, it is most commonly observed feeding on Pittosporum plants.

== Description ==
Monteithiella humeralis adults are 9mm long with predominantly brown bodies and pale green legs. First instar nymphs are small and black, with circular bodies and white spots on the upper surface of the abdomen. Later nymph stages are similar to the first but with orange spots instead of white.

== Life history ==
Adult females lay blue eggs on the underside of leaves which turn white after 2–3 days, and hatch after 5 days. Nymphs progress through 5 instars or juvenile stages before reaching adulthood. It takes around 41 days after eggs are laid for bugs to mature to adulthood. In New Zealand, adults are most abundant in November and March. while eggs and nymphs can be found from November to April.

== Ecology ==
In both New Zealand and Australia, pittosporum shield bugs are most commonly found feeding on species of Pittosporum, and to a lesser extent Coprosma. In New Zealand, pittosporum shield bugs are widespread but are not considered a pest. They are known to be attacked by Trissolcus basalis, a parasitoid wasp of pentatomid egg masses introduced into New Zealand in 1949 to control Nezara viridula.

== Gallery ==
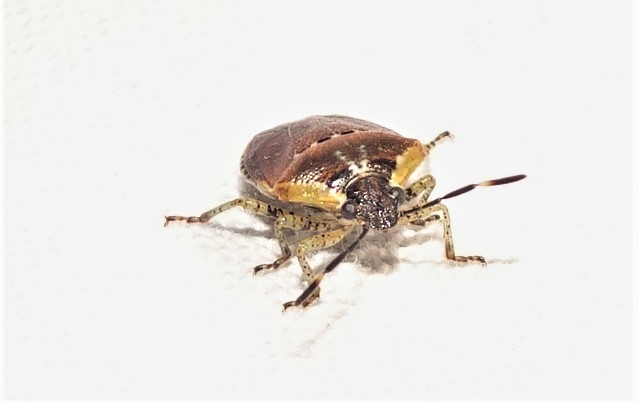
Front view

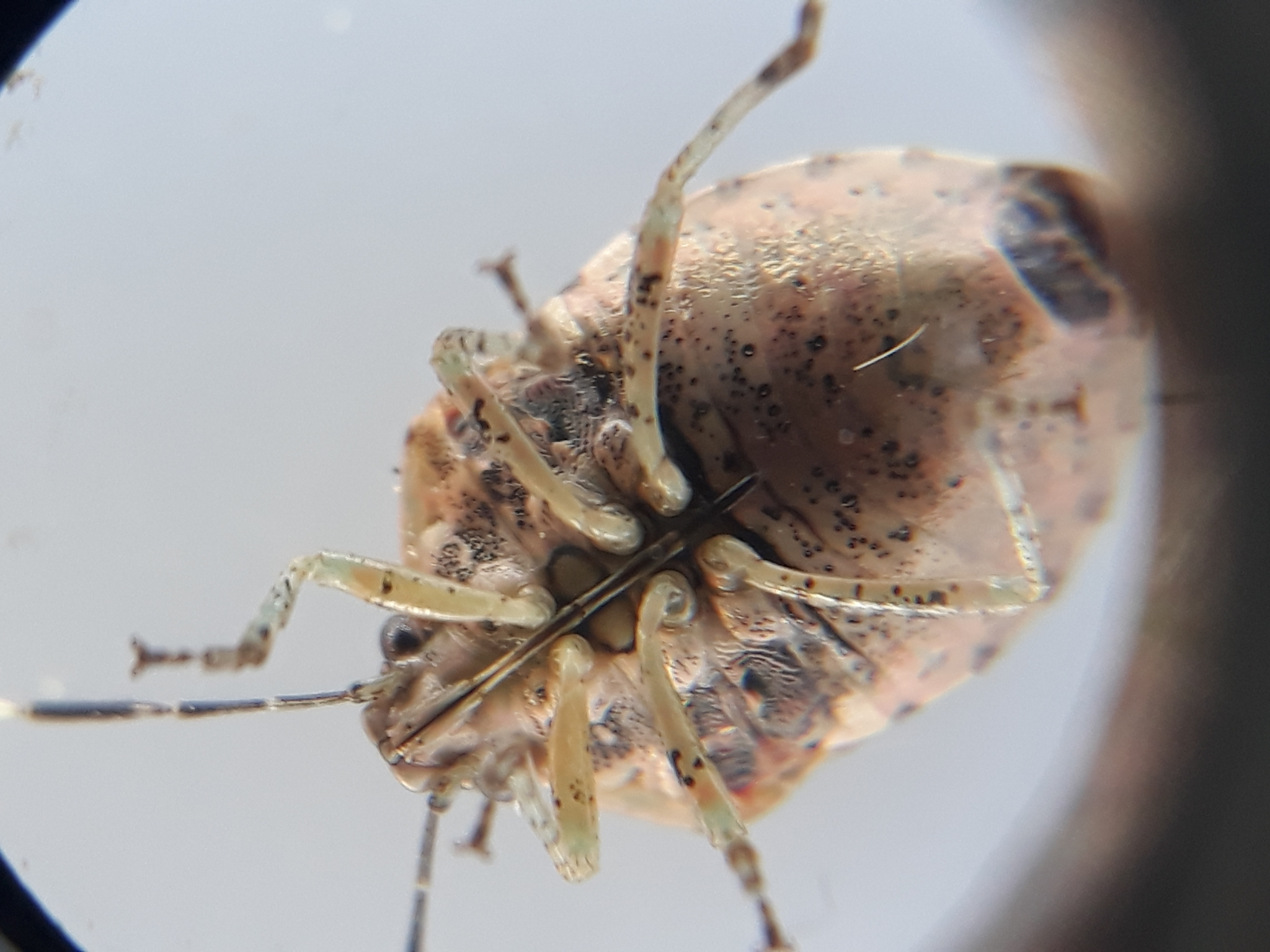
Underside

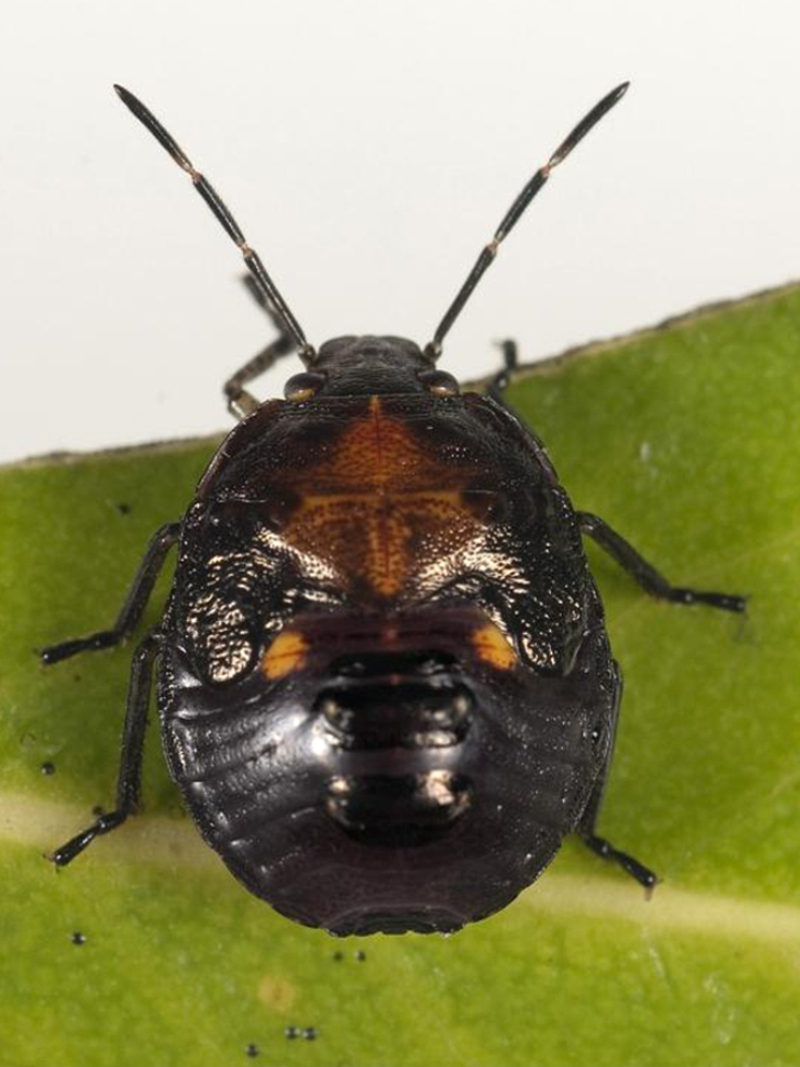
Late-instar nymph
