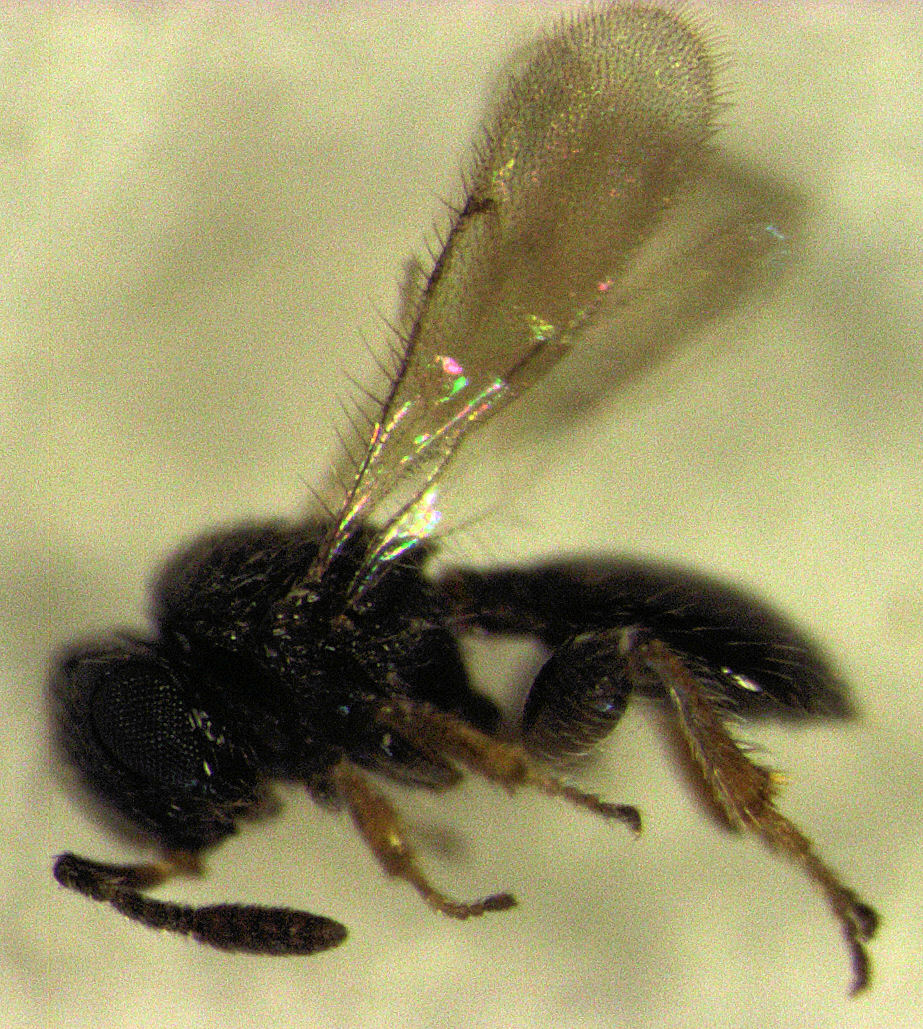
- General habitus of Gryonella sp.
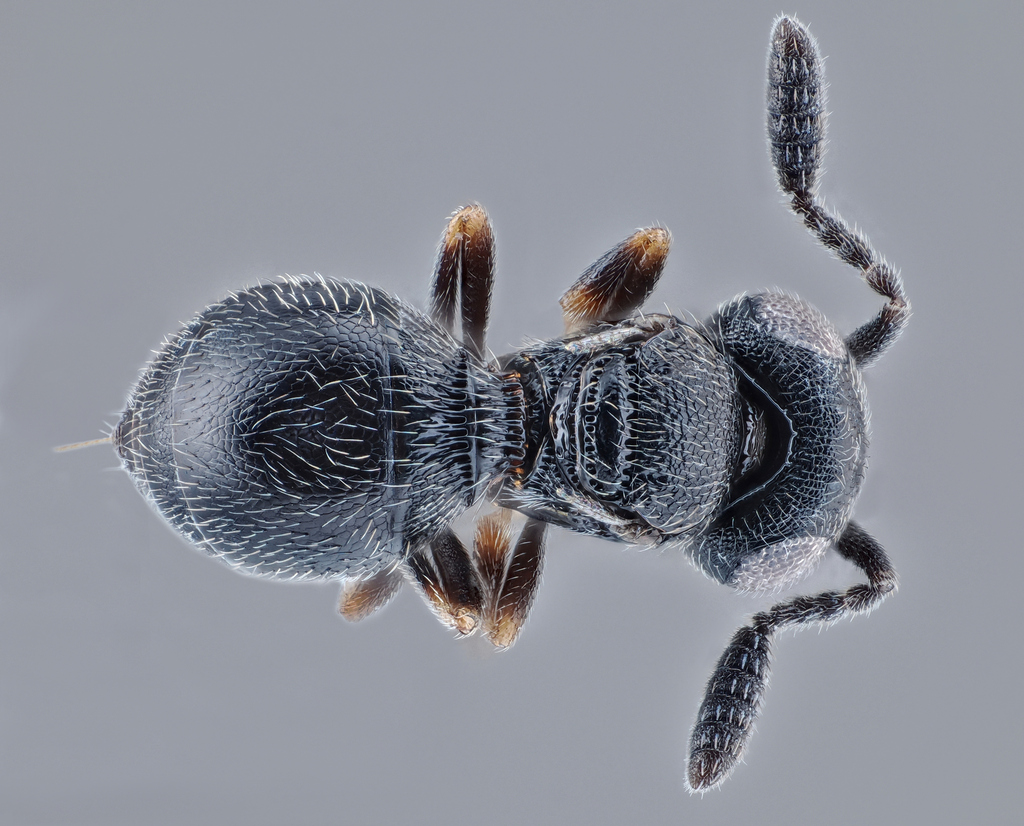
- Trimorus timareta from Belgium

Scientific classification
- Kingdom: Animalia
- Phylum: Arthropoda
- Clade: Pancrustacea
- Class: Insecta
- Order: Hymenoptera
- Family: Scelionidae
- Subfamily: Teleasinae

= Teleasinae =

Subfamily of wasps

Teleasinae is a subfamily of parasitoid wasps in the family Scelionidae. It was previously considered a subfamily of Platygastridae.

== Genera ==
These genera belong to the subfamily Teleasinae:

- Ceratoteleas Kozlov, 1965
- Dvivarnus Rajmohana & Veenakumari, 2011
- Echinoteleas Risbec, 1954
- Gryonella Dodd, 1914
- Gryonoides Dodd, 1920
- Odontoscelio Kieffer, 1905
- Prosacantha Nees, 1834
- Ptilostenius Kozlov & Lê, 1988
- Scutelliteleas Szabó, 1966
- Teleas Latreille, 1809
- Trimorus Förster, 1856
- Trisacantha Ashmead, 1887
- Xenomerus Walker, 1836
- † Cretaxenomerus Nel & Azar, 2005
