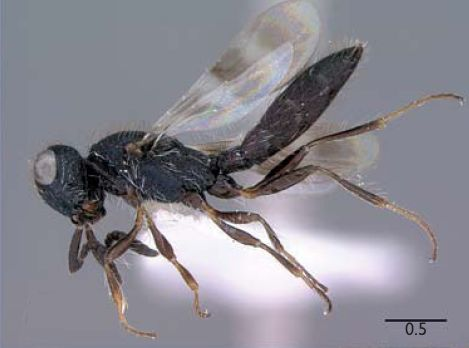
- Scelio antorides

Scientific classification
- Kingdom: Animalia
- Phylum: Arthropoda
- Class: Insecta
- Order: Hymenoptera
- Family: Scelionidae
- Subfamily: Scelioninae
- Genus: Scelio; Latreille, 1805

Diversity
- at least 240 species

= Scelio =

Genus of wasps

Scelio is a large genus (at least 240 and possibly 500 species), the largest within the family Scelionidae, of parasitic wasp whose known target hosts include the eggs of grasshoppers (Acrididae, Orthoptera). They are found worldwide and some species have been implemented as biological control agents.

== See also ==
- List of Scelio species
