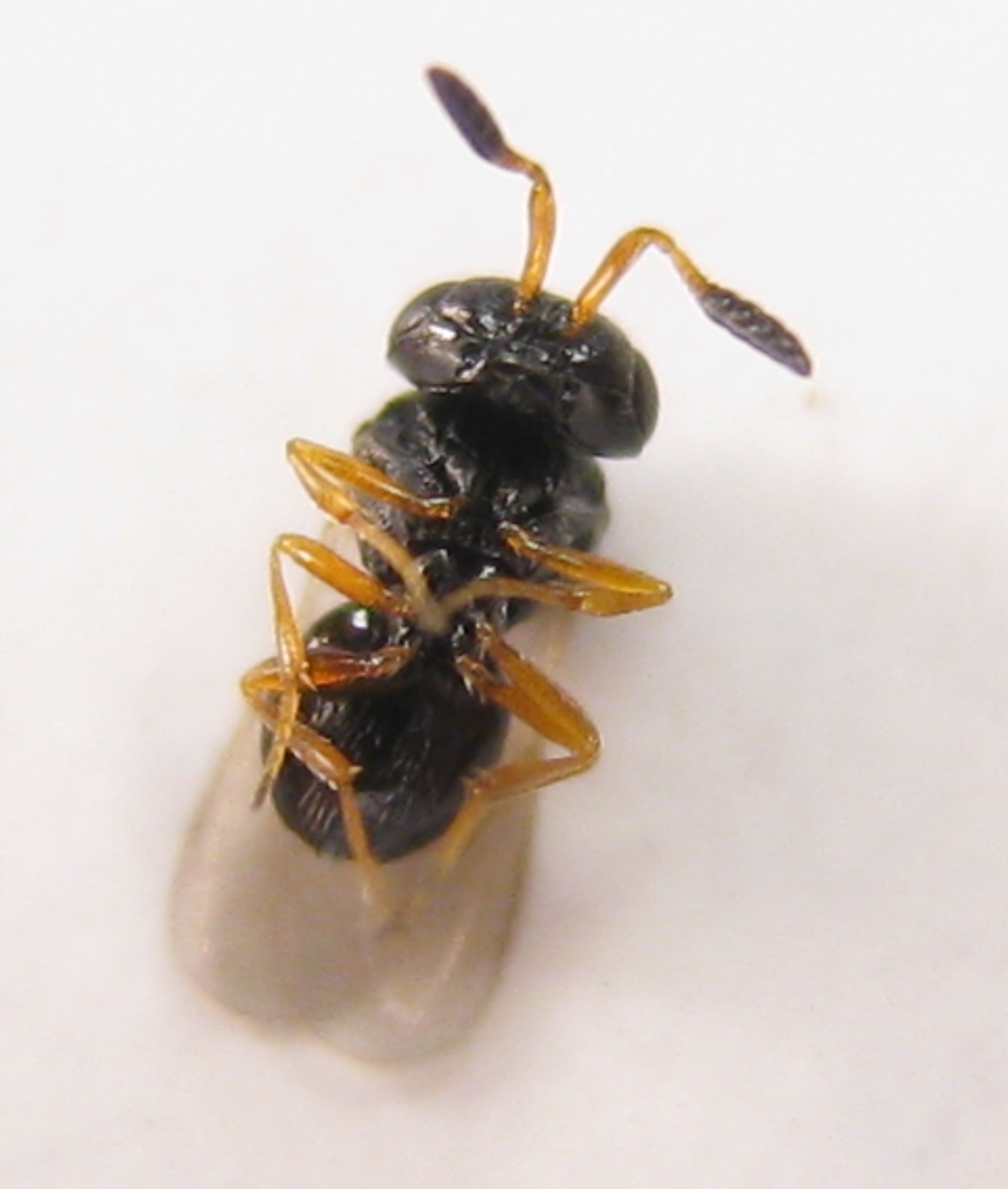
- Trissolcus edessae female

Scientific classification
- Kingdom: Animalia
- Phylum: Arthropoda
- Class: Insecta
- Order: Hymenoptera
- Family: Scelionidae
- Subfamily: Telenominae

= Telenominae =

Subfamily of wasps

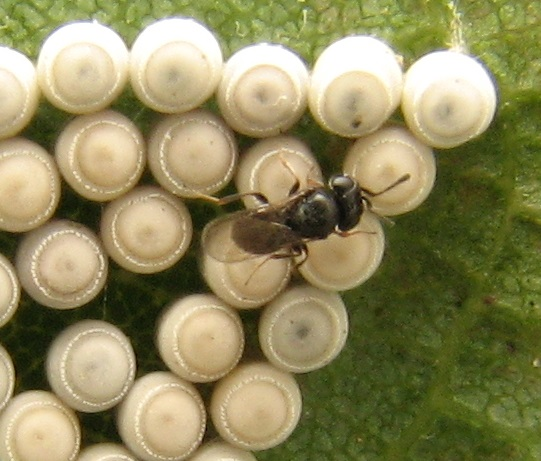
Trissolcus female, depositing on eggs of green stink bug

Telenominae is a subfamily of parasitoid wasps in the family Scelionidae. It was previously considered a subfamily of Platygastridae.

== Genera ==
These genera belong to the subfamily Telenominae:

- Eumicrosoma Gahan 1913
- Nirupana Nixon 1935
- Paratelenomous Dodd, 1914
- Phanuromyia Dodd 1914
- Protelenomus Kieffer, 1906
- Psix Kozlov, 1976
- Telenomus Haliday, 1833
- Trissolcus Ashmead, 1893
