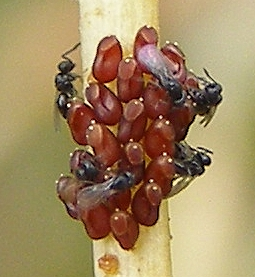
- Telenomus sp.

Scientific classification
- Kingdom: Animalia
- Phylum: Arthropoda
- Class: Insecta
- Order: Hymenoptera
- Family: Scelionidae
- Subfamily: Scelioninae; Haliday, 1839

= Scelioninae =

Subfamily of wasps

Scelioninae is a subfamily of wasps in the family Scelionidae. It is a very large cosmopolitan group (over 3000 described species in some 160 genera) of exclusively parasitoid wasps, mostly small (0.5–10 mm), often black, often highly sculptured, usually with geniculate (elbowed) antennae that have a 9- or 10-segmented flagellum. It was formerly classified as a subfamily of the Platygastridae, but in 2021 the family Scelionidae was revived, containing the subfamilies Scelioninae, Teleasinae, and Telenominae.

== Biology ==
They are generally idiobionts, attacking the eggs of many different types of insects, spiders, butterflies (the hackberry emperor, for example) and many are important in biological control. Several genera are wingless, and a few attack aquatic insect eggs underwater.

== See also ==
- List of Scelioninae genera
