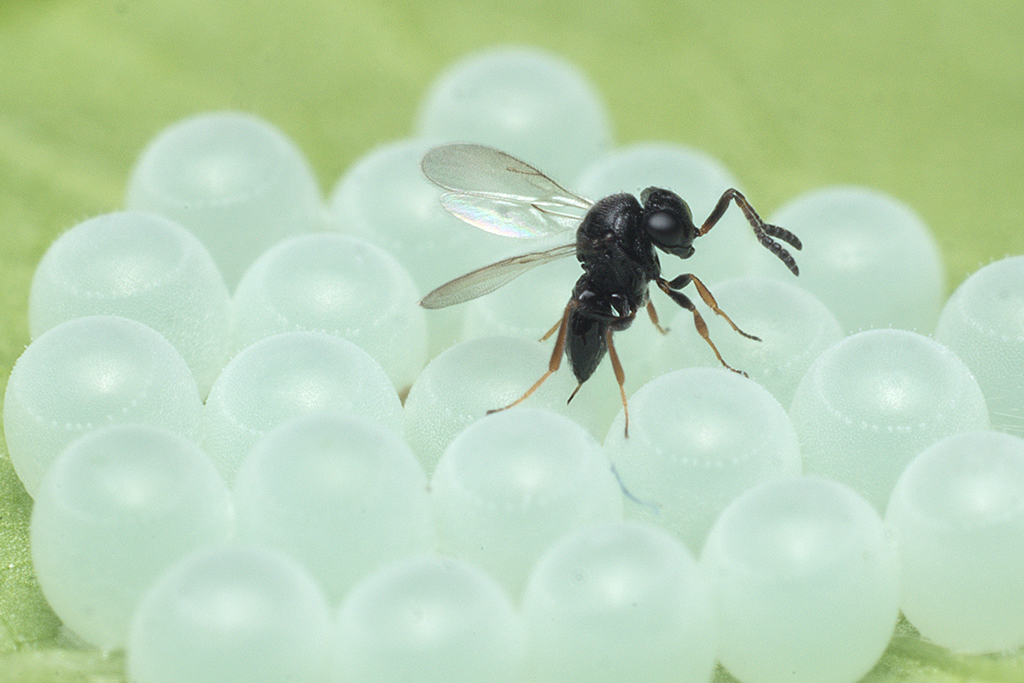
- Telenomus sp.

Scientific classification
- Kingdom: Animalia
- Phylum: Arthropoda
- Class: Insecta
- Order: Hymenoptera
- Suborder: Apocrita
- Infraorder: Proctotrupomorpha
- Superfamily: Platygastroidea
- Family: Scelionidae; Haliday, 1839

Subfamilies
- Scelioninae; Teleasinae; Telenominae

= Scelionidae =

Family of insects

The hymenopteran family Scelionidae is a very large cosmopolitan group (over 3000 described species in some 176 genera) of exclusively parasitoid wasps, mostly small (0.5–10 mm), often black, often highly sculptured, with (typically) elbowed antennae that have a 9- or 10-segmented flagellum. It was once considered to be a subfamily of the Platygastridae, but has been revived in the most recent classification of Platygastroidea.

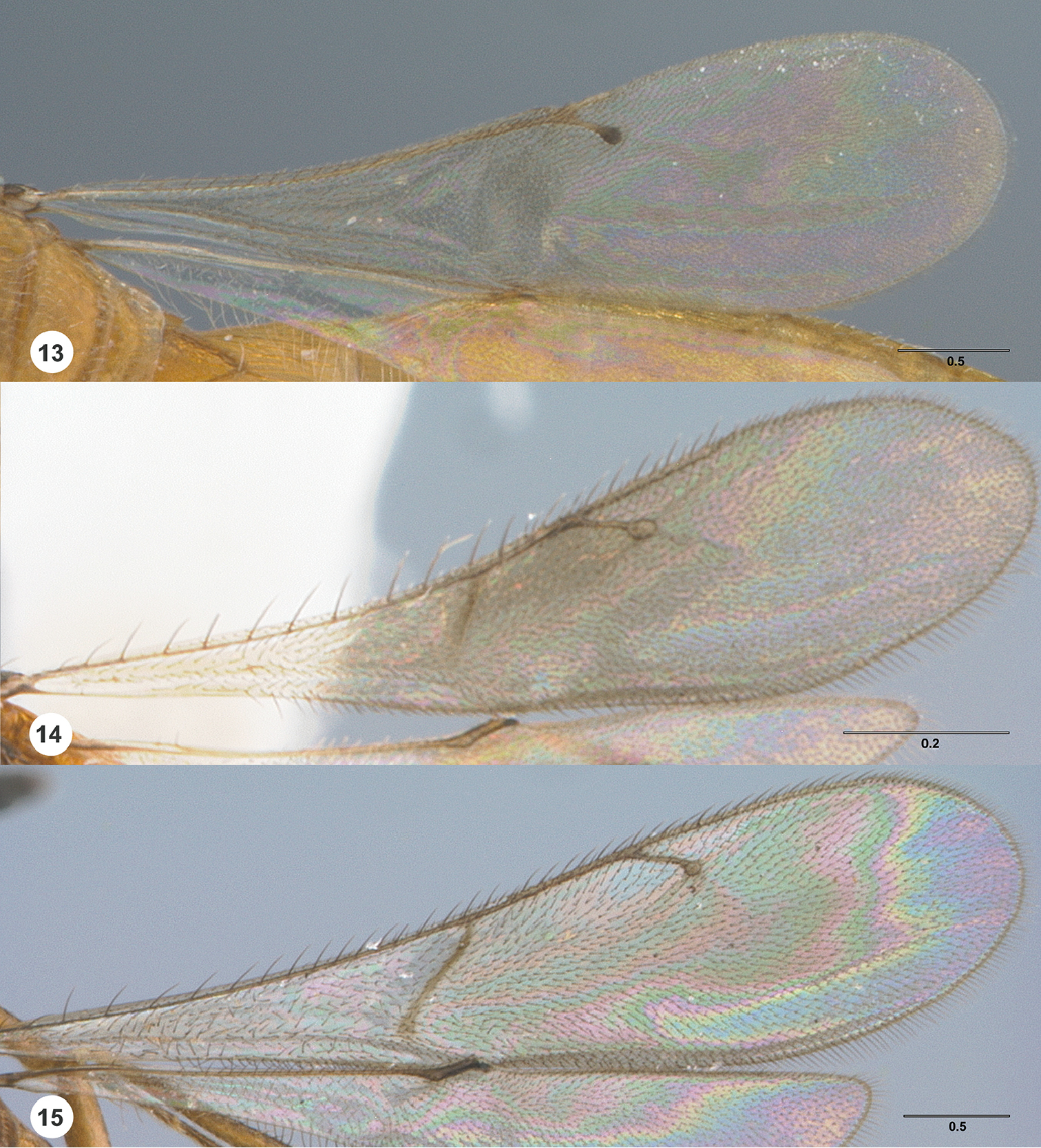
Wing venation of three New-World species of Calliscelio

Scelionid wasps have reduced forewing venation, often with only one or two tubular veins along the front margin (many have submarginal, marginal, stigmal, and postmarginal veins). This resembles the pattern often seen in Chalcidoidea.

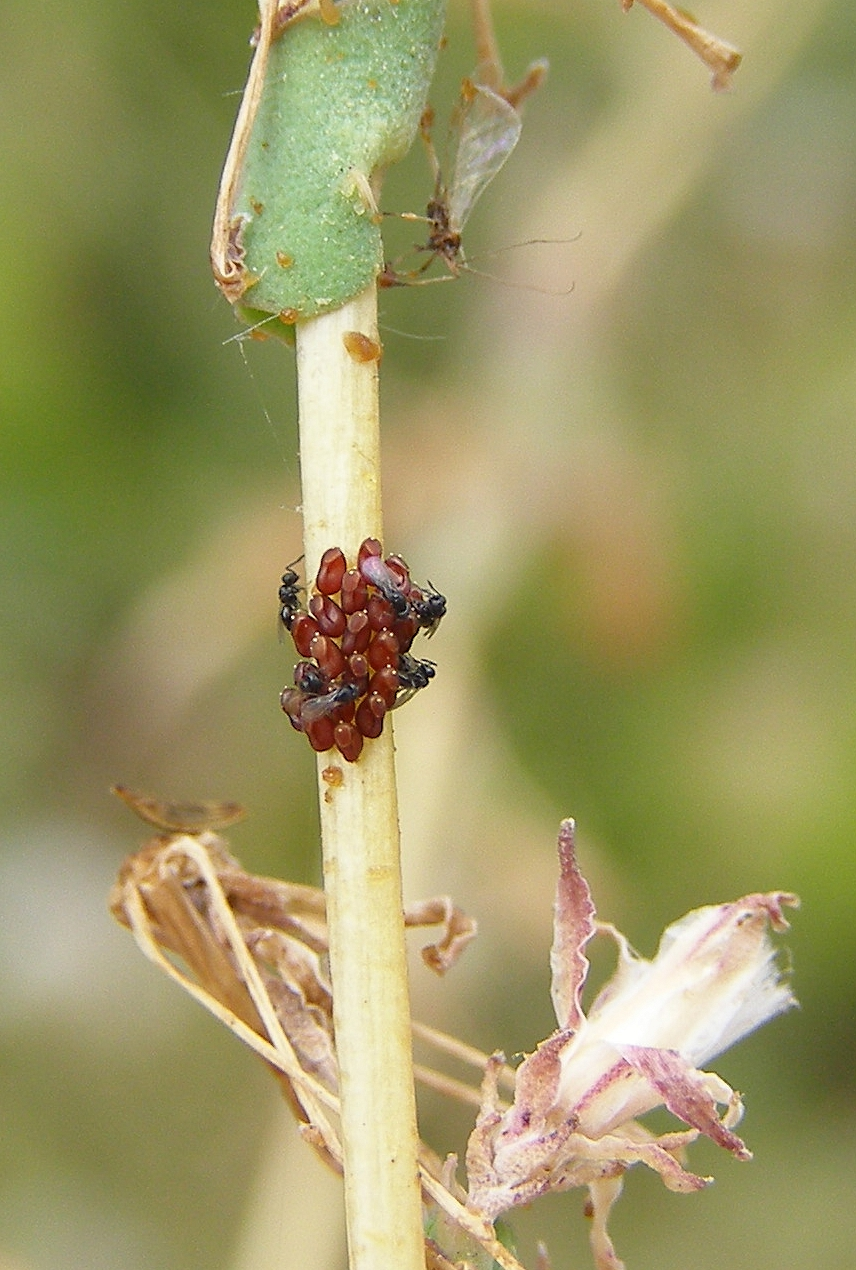

They are generally idiobionts, attacking the eggs of various insects, such as butterflies (e.g., the hackberry emperor), and spiders. Many scelionids are important in biological control. Several genera are wingless, and a few attack aquatic insect eggs underwater.
