= List of Scelioninae genera =

This is a list of 145 genera in the subfamily Scelioninae.

== Scelioninae genera ==
- Acanthoscelio Ashmead, 1893
- Acolomorpha Dodd, 1914
- Acutibaeus Meunier, 1917
- Alloteleia Kieffer, 1917
- Amblyscelio Kieffer, 1913
- Aneurobaeus Kieffer, 1912
- Aneuroscelio Kieffer, 1913
- Anteris Förster, 1856
- Anteromorpha Dodd, 1913
- Anthonyon Huggert & Masner, 1983
- Antroscelio Kieffer, 1913
- Apegus Förster, 1856
- Apobaeus Masner, 1964
- Apteroscelio Kieffer, 1913
- Aradophagus Ashmead, 1893
- Archaeoscelio Brues, 1940
- Archaeoteleia Masner, 1968
- Baeus Haliday, 1833
- Baryconus Förster, 1856
- Bracalba Dodd, 1931
- Brachyscelio Brues, 1940
- Breviscelio Sundholm, 1970
- Calliscelio Ashmead, 1893
- Calotelea Westwood, 1837
- Cenomanoscelio Schlüter, 1978
- Ceratobaeus Ashmead, 1893
- Chromoteleia Ashmead, 1893
- Cobaloscelio Johnson & Masner, 2007
- Crama Galloway, 1984
- Cremastobaeus Ashmead, 1893
- Cretaxenomerus Nel & Azar, 2005
- Cyphacolus Priesner, 1951
- Dibaryconus Kieffer, 1926
- Dichoteleas Kieffer, 1907
- Dicroscelio Kieffer, 1913
- Doddiella Kieffer, 1913
- Duarina Dodd, 1926
- Duta Nixon, 1933
- Dyscritobaeus Perkins, 1910
- Echthrodesis Masner, 1968
- Electroteleia Brues, 1940
- Embidobia Ashmead, 1896
- Embioctonus Masner, 1980
- Encyrtoscelio Dodd, 1914
- Endecascelio Masner & Dessart, 1972
- Epigryon Masner, 1980
- Eremioscelio Priesner, 1951
- Freniger Szabó, 1956
- Fusicornia Risbec, 1950
- Galloscelio Nel & Prokop, 2005
- Genatropis Galloway, 1984
- Gryon Haliday, 1833
- Habroteleia Kieffer, 1905
- Heptascelio Kieffer, 1916
- Hickmanella Austin, 1981
- Hirtiteleas Risbec, 1956
- Holoteleia Kieffer, 1908
- Huddlestonium Polaszek & Johnson, 2007
- Hungarogryon Szabó, 1966
- Idris Förster, 1856
- Janzenella Masner & Johnson, 2007
- Jarabambius Galloway, 1982
- Lapithoides Nixon, 1933
- Lepidoscelio Kieffer, 1905
- Leptoteleia Kieffer, 1908
- Lidgbirdius Galloway, 1982
- Lispoteleia Galloway, 1984
- Macroteleia Westwood, 1835
- Mallateleia Dodd, 1913
- Mantibaria Kirby, 1900
- Marginanteris Risbec, 1957
- Marshalliella Kieffer, 1913
- Maruzza Mineo, 1982
- Masnerella Özdikmen, 2005
- Mecix Masner, 1980
- Merriwa Dodd, 1920
- Microteleia Kieffer, 1910
- Microthoron Masner, 1972
- Mirobaeoides Dodd, 1914
- Mirobaeus Dodd, 1914
- Monoteleia Kieffer, 1926
- Moravoscelio Nel & Prokop, 2005
- Neobaeus Austin, 1988
- Neoparidris Galloway, 1984
- Neoscelio Dodd, 1913
- Neuroscelio Dodd, 1913
- Nixonia Masner, 1958
- Nyleta Dodd, 1926
- Odontacolus Kieffer, 1910
- Oethecoctonus Ashmead, 1893
- Okapa Mineo & Caleca, 1996
- Opisthacantha Ashmead, 1893
- Oreiscelio Kieffer, 1910
- Oxyscelio Kieffer, 1907
- Oxyteleia Kieffer, 1908
- Palaeogryon Masner, 1969
- Palpoteleia Kieffer, 1926
- Parabaryconus Kozlov & Kononova, 2000
- Parabrachyscelio Risbec, 1957
- Paraduta Szabó, 1974
- Parascelio Dodd, 1920
- Pardoteleia Kozlov & Lê, 1988
- Paridris Kieffer, 1908
- Phaedroteleia Kieffer, 1916
- Phoenoteleia Kieffer, 1916
- Platyscelidris Szabó, 1959
- Platyscelio Kieffer, 1905
- Plaumannion Masner & Johnson, 2007
- Probaryconus Kieffer, 1908
- Proplatyscelio Brues, 1940
- Proteroscelio Brues, 1937
- Pseudanteris Fouts, 1927
- Pseudoheptascelio Szabó, 1966
- Psilanteris Kieffer, 1916
- Psiloteleia Kieffer, 1910
- Roena Cameron, 1905
- Romilius Walker, 1842
- Sceliacantha Dodd, 1913
- Sceliacanthella Dodd, 1913
- Scelio Latreille, 1805
- Sceliocerdo Muesebeck, 1972
- Scelioliria Brèthes, 1916
- Sceliomorpha Ashmead, 1893
- Scelionites Statz, 1938
- Sembilanocera Brues, 1940
- Shreemana Nixon, 1933
- Sparasion Latreille, 1802
- Spiniteleia Masner, 1980
- Stenotelea Huggert & Masner, 1983
- Styloteleia Kieffer, 1916
- Synoditella Muesebeck, 1972
- Tanaodytes Masner, 1972
- Thoron Haliday, 1833
- Thoronella Masner, 1972
- Thoronidea Masner & Huggert, 1979
- Tiphodytes Bradley, 1900
- Trachelopteron Brues, 1940
- Trichoteleia Kieffer, 1910
- Triteleia Kieffer, 1906
- Tuora Kozlov, 1976
- Tyrannoscelio Masner, Johnson, & Arias-Penna, 2007
- Uroteleia Brues, 1940
- Xentor Masner & Johnson, 2007
- Yunkara Galloway, 1984
