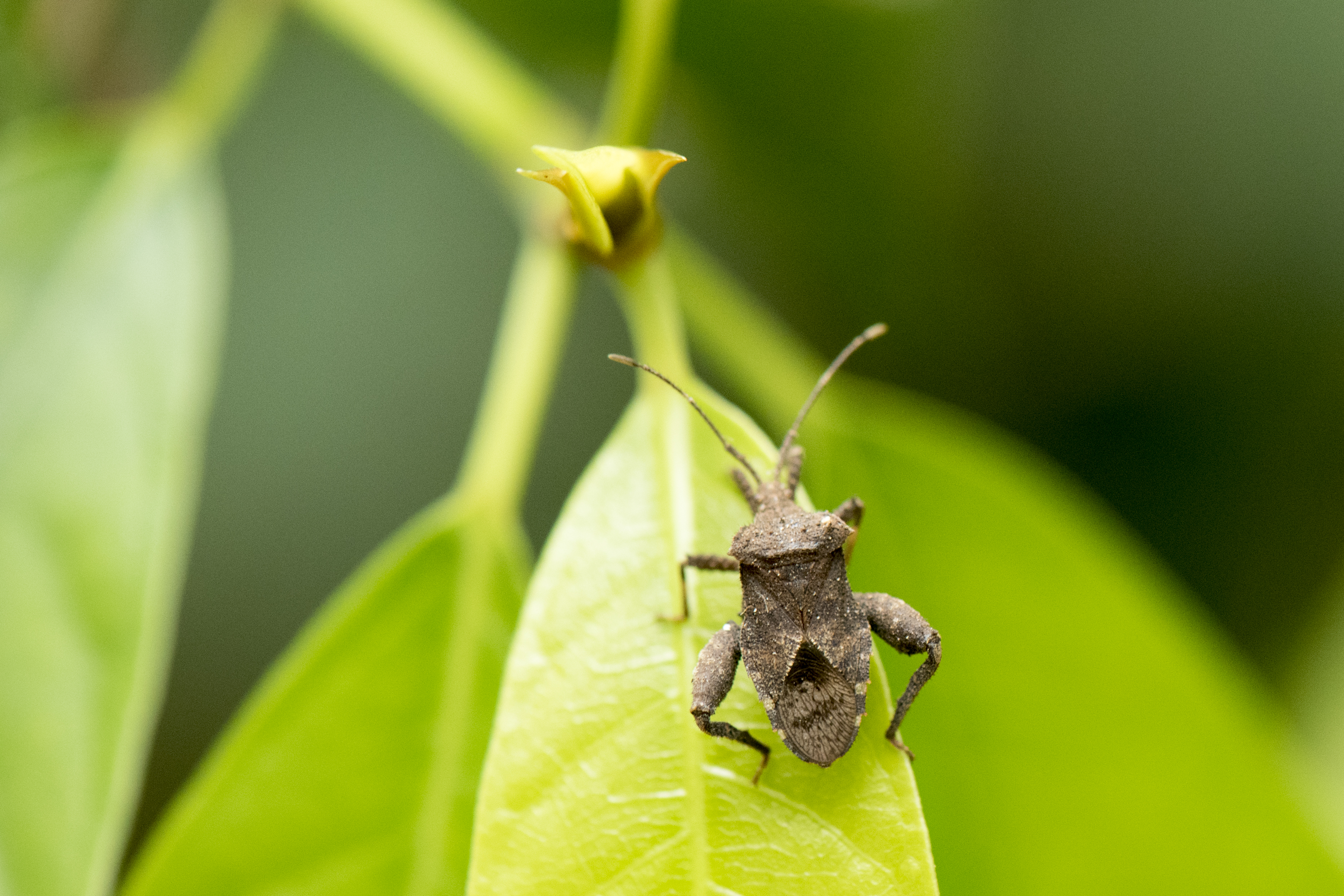
- Acanthocoris scaber

Scientific classification
- Domain: Eukaryota
- Kingdom: Animalia
- Phylum: Arthropoda
- Class: Insecta
- Order: Hemiptera
- Suborder: Heteroptera
- Family: Coreidae
- Subfamily: Coreinae
- Tribe: Acanthocorini
- Genus: Acanthocoris; Amyot & Serville, 1843

= Acanthocoris =

Genus of true bugs

Acanthocoris (Note: not to be confused with Anacanthocoris: a subgenus of Homoeocerus) is the type genus of the tribe Acanthocorini, erected by Amyot and Serville in 1843. Species of these leaf-footed bugs have been recorded from Africa and Asia.

== Species ==
The Coreoidea Species File lists:

1. Acanthocoris acutus Blöte, 1935
2. Acanthocoris affinis (Westwood, 1842)
3. Acanthocoris agilis Schouteden, 1938
4. Acanthocoris anticus Walker, 1871
5. Acanthocoris ariasi García Varela, 1913
6. Acanthocoris callewaerti Schouteden, 1912
7. Acanthocoris carlieri Schouteden, 1911
8. Acanthocoris collarti Schouteden, 1938
9. Acanthocoris declivicollis Blöte, 1935
10. Acanthocoris delevali Schouteden, 1910
11. Acanthocoris dentatus Haglund, 1895
12. Acanthocoris distinctus Schouteden, 1938
13. Acanthocoris elegans Blöte, 1935
14. Acanthocoris erythraeensis Blöte, 1935
15. Acanthocoris esau Distant, 1901
16. Acanthocoris fasciculatus (Fabricius, 1781)
17. Acanthocoris granosus (Stål, 1855)
18. Acanthocoris granulosus Signoret, 1858
19. Acanthocoris leopoldi Schouteden, 1929
20. Acanthocoris liberiensis Blöte, 1935
21. Acanthocoris lineatus Blöte, 1935
22. Acanthocoris lugens Stål, 1855
23. Acanthocoris major Blöte, 1935
24. Acanthocoris mamillatus Blöte, 1935
25. Acanthocoris obscuricornis Dallas, 1852
26. Acanthocoris ruandanus Schouteden, 1957
27. Acanthocoris rudis Blöte, 1935
28. Acanthocoris scaber (Linnaeus, 1763)
29. Acanthocoris scabrator (Fabricius, 1803) - type species (as Coreus scabrator)
30. Acanthocoris scrofa (Germar, 1838)
31. Acanthocoris sordidus (Thunberg, 1783)
32. Acanthocoris speyeri Blöte, 1935
33. Acanthocoris spinosus Signoret, 1858
34. Acanthocoris spurcus (Germar, 1838)
35. Acanthocoris terreus Bergroth, 1894
36. Acanthocoris tibialis Signoret, 1861
