= Merriwa =

Merriwa may refer to several places:

- Merriwa, New South Wales
- Merriwa Shire, former municipality in New South Wales
- Merriwa, Western Australia

== See also ==
- Merriwa (wasp), a genus of wasps in the family Platygastridae
- Merriwa River, river in New South Wales
