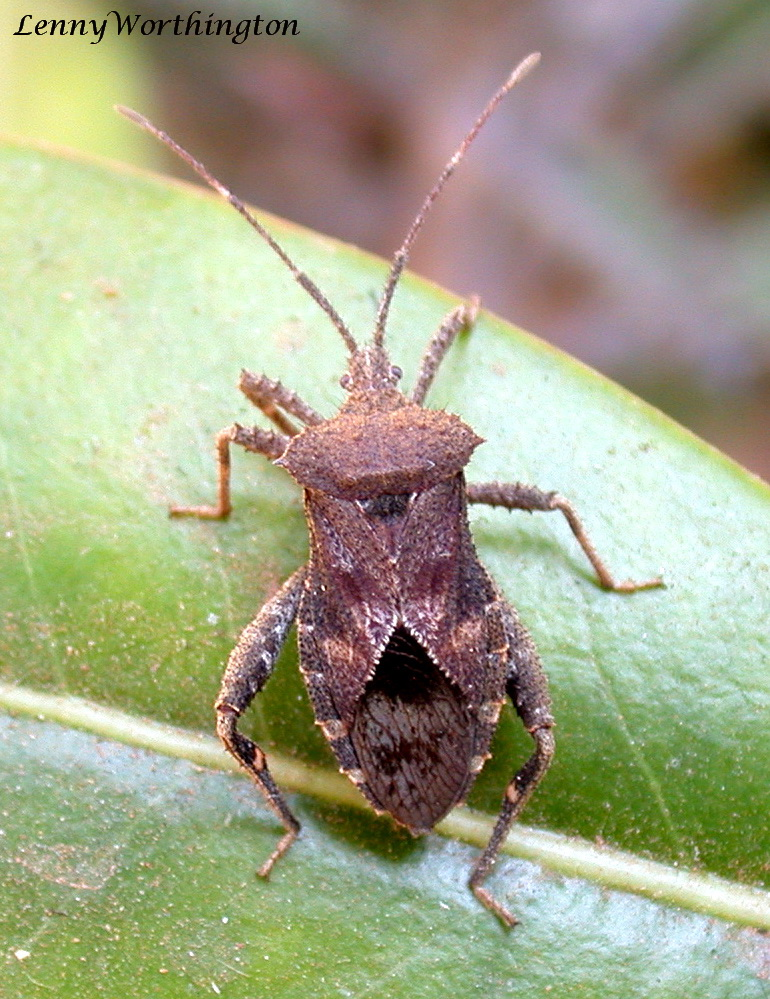
- Acanthocoris scaber in Thailand

Scientific classification
- Kingdom: Animalia
- Phylum: Arthropoda
- Class: Insecta
- Order: Hemiptera
- Suborder: Heteroptera
- Family: Coreidae
- Genus: Acanthocoris
- Species: A. scaber

Binomial name
- Acanthocoris scaber (Linnaeus, 1763)

Synonyms
- Acanthocoris acutus (Dallas, 1852); Cimex clavipes (Fabricius, 1787); Cimex magnipes (Gmelin, 1790); Cimex scaber (Linnaeus, 1763); Crinocerus fuscus (Westwood, 1842)

= Acanthocoris scaber =

Species of insect

Acanthocoris scaber is a species of leaf-footed bug in the order Hemiptera. It is a crop pest in China.

== Taxonomy ==
A. scaber was described in 1763 by Carl Linnaeus. The prefix "acantho-" in the genus name comes from the Greek akantha, meaning "thorn." "Coris" signifies the Greek word for bed bugs, κόρις. The specific epithet, "scaber" indicates the rough back of the insect.

== Distribution ==
A. scaber is found mainly in South and Southeast Asia. It is diurnal.

== Relationship with humans ==
A. scaber has been found to feed on many vegetable species in China, especially chili peppers.

== Parasites ==
An assessment of A. scaber eggs discovered that parasitic wasps from the genus Gryon, specifically the species Gryon ancinla, have been found there.
