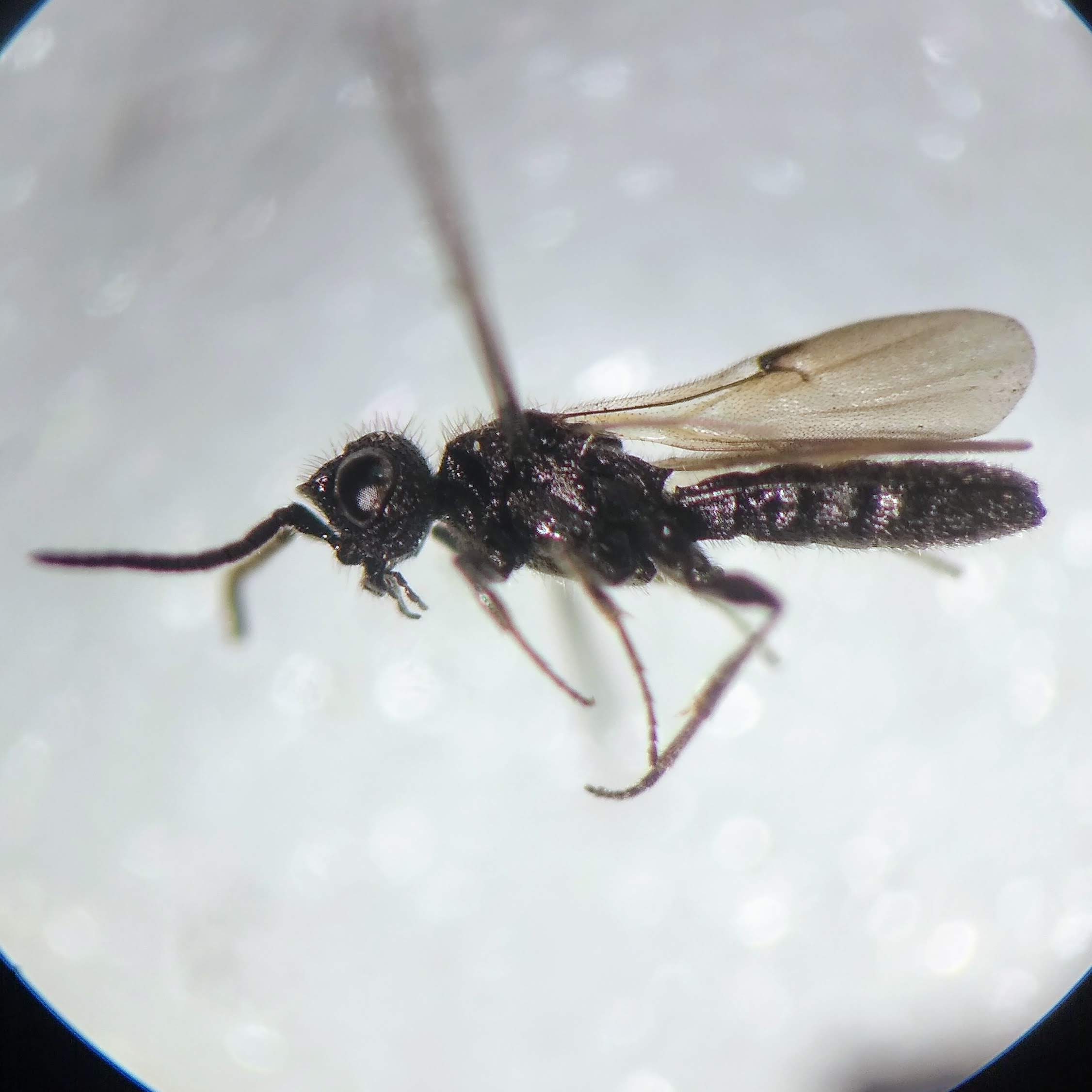

Scientific classification
- Kingdom: Animalia
- Phylum: Arthropoda
- Clade: Pancrustacea
- Class: Insecta
- Order: Hymenoptera
- Family: Sparasionidae
- Genus: Sparasion; Latreille, 1802

= Sparasion =

Genus of wasps

Sparasion is a genus of wasps belonging to the family Sparasionidae, within the superfamily Platygastroidea. The genus has specimens widespread in Eurasia, Africa, and temperate North America.

== Species ==
The genus includes 141 species.

Some species:

- Sparasion aenescens Förster, 1856
- Sparasion aeneum Kieffer, 1906
- Sparasion albopilosellum Cameron, 1906
