= Pomponatius =

Scientific classification
- Kingdom: Animalia
- Phylum: Arthropoda
- Clade: Pancrustacea
- Class: Insecta
- Order: Hemiptera
- Suborder: Heteroptera
- Family: Coreidae
- Subfamily: Coreinae
- Tribe: Acanthocorini
- Genus: Pomponatius; Distant, 1904

Genus of insects

Pomponatius is a genus of leaf-footed bugs, in the tribe Acanthocorini, erected by William Lucas Distant in 1904.
