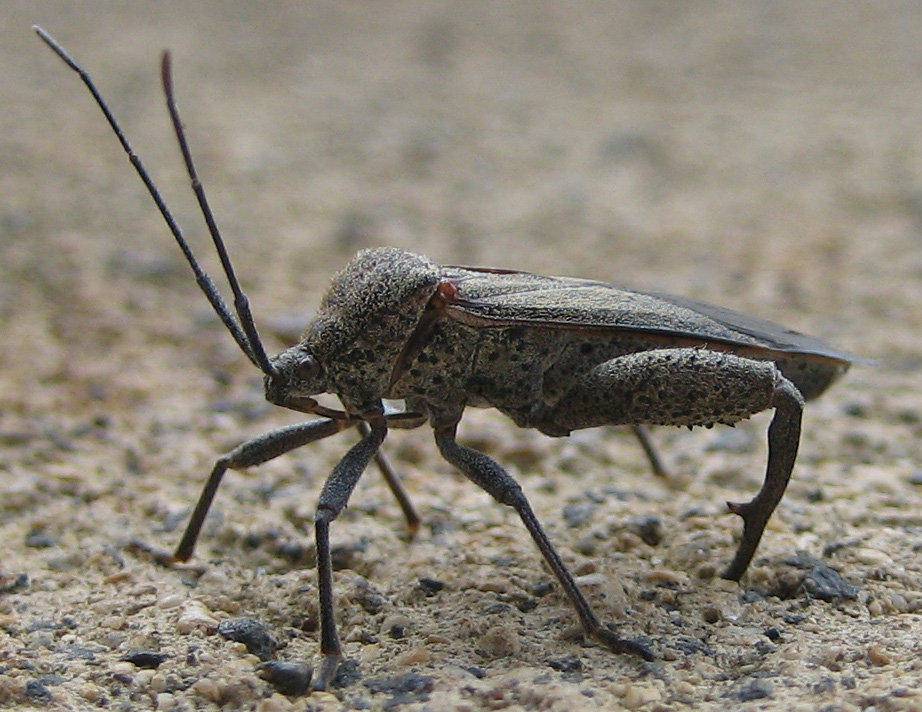
- Physomerus grossipes

Scientific classification
- Kingdom: Animalia
- Phylum: Arthropoda
- Class: Insecta
- Order: Hemiptera
- Suborder: Heteroptera
- Family: Coreidae
- Subfamily: Coreinae
- Tribe: Acanthocorini
- Genus: Physomerus; Burmeister, 1835

Synonyms
- Phycomerus Stål, 1859

= Physomerus =

Genus of true bug

Physomerus is a genus of Asian true bugs in the subfamily Coreinae, subfamily Coreinae, tribe Acanthocorini; containing the notable pest species Physomerus grossipes (Fabricius, 1794). The genus was erected by Hermann Burmeister in 1835.

== Species ==
1. Physomerus centralis Mukherjee, Hassan & Biswas, 2016
2. Physomerus flavicans Blöte, 1935
3. Physomerus grossipes (Fabricius, 1794) - type species (as Lygaeus grossipes Fabricius)
4. Physomerus parvulus Dallas, 1852
