= Baeus seminulum =

Scientific classification
- Kingdom: Animalia
- Phylum: Arthropoda
- Class: Insecta
- Order: Hymenoptera
- Family: Scelionidae
- Genus: Baeus
- Species: B. seminulum

Binomial name
- Baeus seminulum Haliday, 1833

Species of wasp

Baeus seminulum is a species of parasitic wasp found in western Europe. Its known hosts are spider eggs, especially of the families Araneidae and Theridiidae.

== Description ==
Females do not have any wings, instead they ride on adults female spiders until it lays eggs. The male's wings are narrow and feature long marginal setae, with the longest marginal setae nearly as long as the maximum wing width. The hind wing is 8.5 times its maximum width, with the longest marginal setae measuring 1.6 times the maximum wing width.

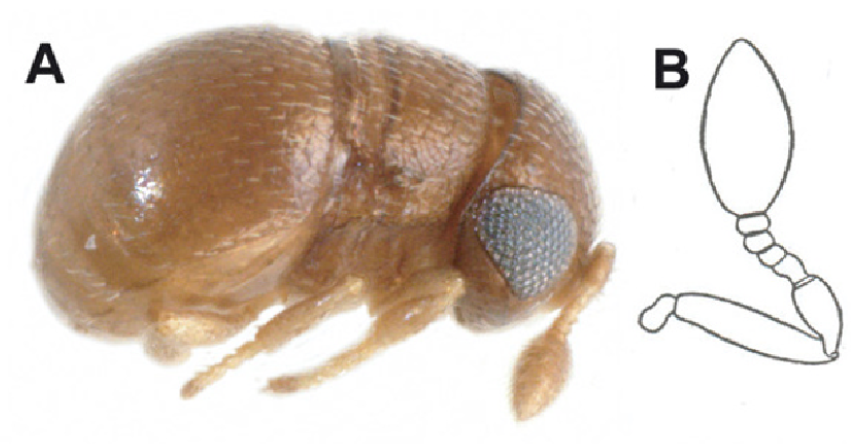
female B. seminulum, Reijo Jussila

Female antennae is clavate. Males have antennae that are subclavate and have more segments. The first and second abdominal tergites (T1 and T2) are characterized by numerous closely spaced ridges on T2. The genitalia feature well-developed digiti. Males appear closely related to those of Baeus japonicus, although B. japonicus exhibits a slightly narrower forewing and longer marginal setae.

== Distribution ==
B. seminulum is found in western Europe, notably France, Sweden, the United Kingdom, Finland, and Ukraine. The species has also been recorded from several other European countries: Austria, Belgium, Denmark, Germany, Italy, Russia, and Portugal.
