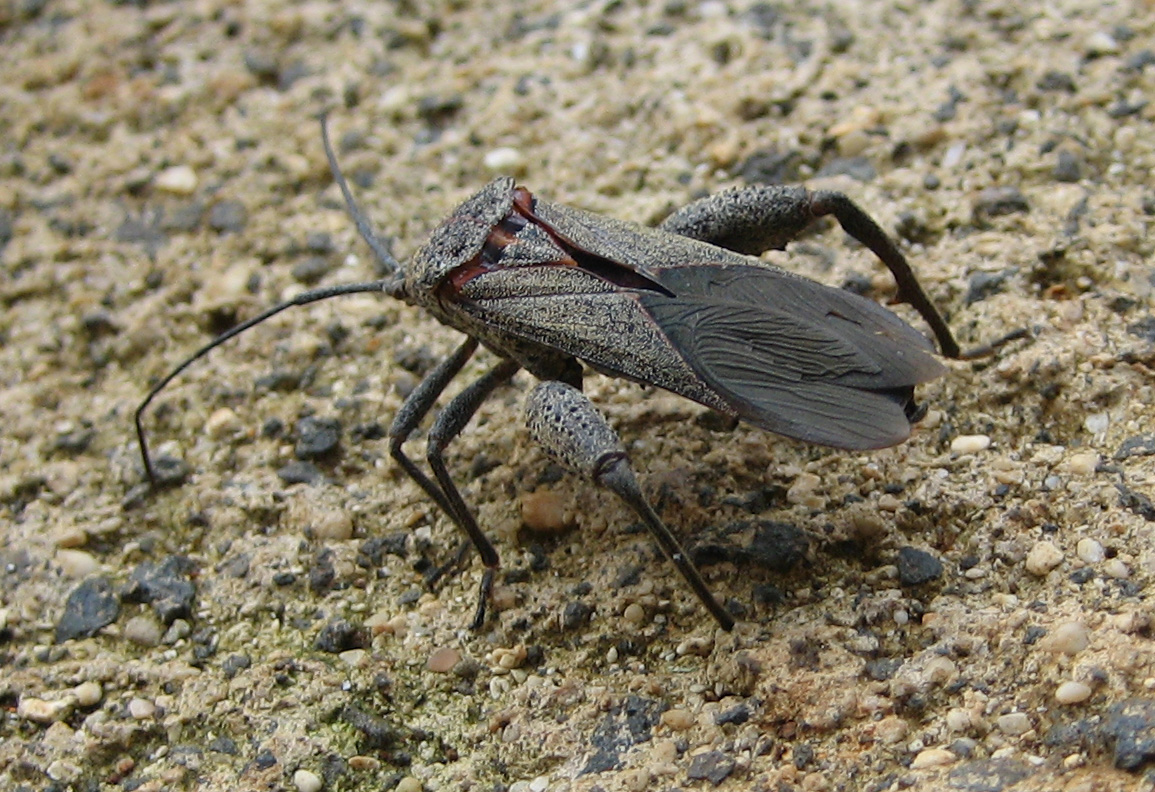
- Adult
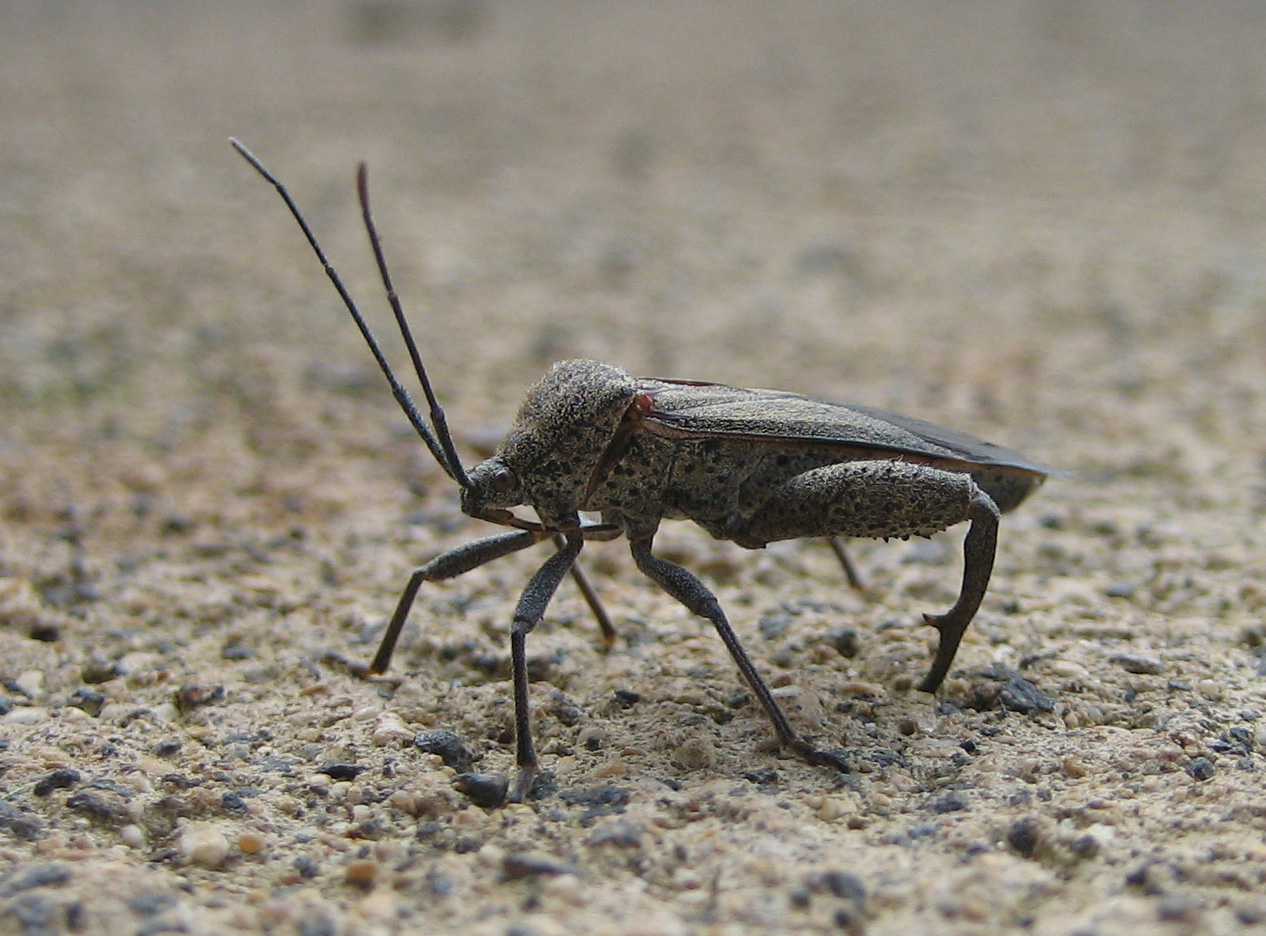

Scientific classification
- Kingdom: Animalia
- Phylum: Arthropoda
- Clade: Pancrustacea
- Class: Insecta
- Order: Hemiptera
- Suborder: Heteroptera
- Family: Coreidae
- Genus: Physomerus
- Species: P. grossipes

Binomial name
- Physomerus grossipes (Fabricius, 1794)

= Physomerus grossipes =

Species of true bug

Physomerus grossipes, the sweetpotato bug or large spine-footed bug, is a species of Hemiptera in the family Coreidae. Native to Southeast Asia, the species has immigrated to the Pacific Islands. Frequently laying its eggs on the same Leguminosae and Convolvulaceae plants on which it feeds, the females of P. grossipes are very protective of their young, notably guarding both eggs and nymphs from predators.

== Distribution ==
Native to Southeast Asia, the species' distribution ranges from Indonesia, throughout Peninsular Malaysia and India. The species has spread to other areas, including Guam and Hawaii.

== Description ==
Brown in color with black legs, individuals grow to be about 2 cm (0.79 in) long. Like other Coreidae, P. grossipes is oval-shaped with segmented antennae, a numerously veined forewing membrane, a metathoracic stink gland, and enlarged hind tibia.

== Feeding ==
The insect feeds on Leguminosae and Convolvulaceae plants. In addition to the sweet potato from which it derives its common name, it frequents other plants of the genus Ipomoea, as well as catjang, Clitoria ternatea and the common bean. Since the removal of juice from the stem in the insect's feeding causes the plant to wither and disrupts its production of fruit, P. grossipes is regarded as a pest.

== Biology ==
The sweetpotato bug oviposits its eggs on the undersides of leaves or on the stems of the plants on which it feeds, as well as on neighboring sedges. A 1990 study found a mean clutch size of 83 eggs, although some egg deposits numbering twice that have been found, possibly representing the collected eggs of several insects. The female of P. grossipes is very protective, providing the "best known example" of "maternal care in the large family Coreidae." Mothers guard their eggs, threatening and occasionally even rushing at the predators that approach them. In addition, P. grossipes generates a strong-smelling fluid from a metathoracic gland with which the mother sprays larger predators through the anal orifice.

In spite of this protection, about 20% of the eggs are eaten by predators such as ants, and 13% are lost to parasitoid predation by chalcidoid wasps, which lay their eggs within the eggs of P. grossipes. Losses to unguarded clutches are much higher. The surviving eggs hatch in roughly 15 days. The insect goes through five nymphal stages ranging from 85 days for males to 88 days for females before reaching full maturity.

After the eggs are hatched, the mother remains to guard the gregarious nymphs, feeding them predigested food. Mixed-age nymph groups have been observed, and several cases of multiple females guarding one nymph group have been documented. Rare enough that this may be an aberration, the phenomenon may also suggest still undisclosed social dimensions to P. grossipes, particularly in conjunction with collective egg clutches. Two mothers possibly are cooperating to guard their broods or an unmated female may assist to raise a brood that is not hers. Males have frequently been found near nymph groups and may also be present to supply protection to the brood.
