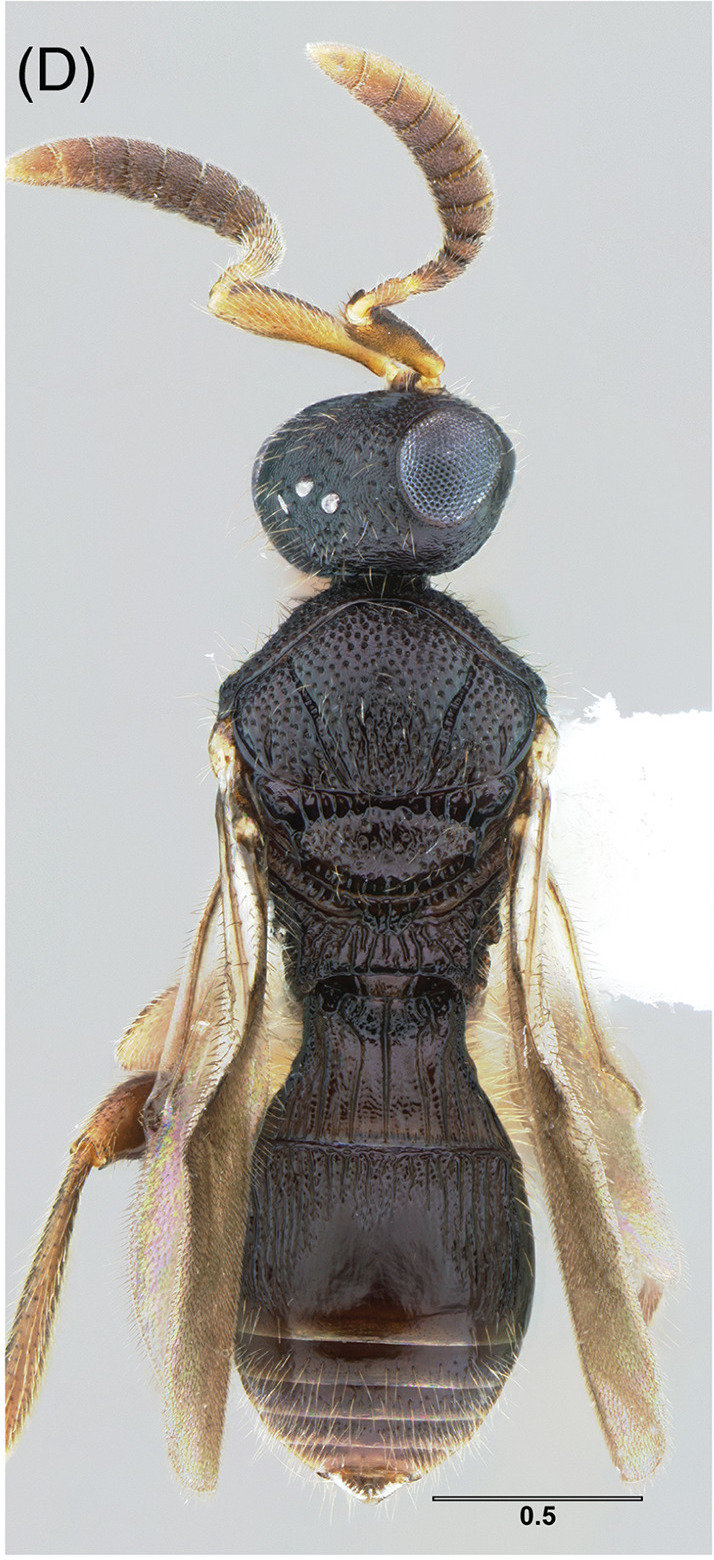
- Neuroscelio doddi

Scientific classification
- Kingdom: Animalia
- Phylum: Arthropoda
- Clade: Pancrustacea
- Class: Insecta
- Order: Hymenoptera
- Superfamily: Platygastroidea
- Family: Neuroscelionidae; Chen et al. 2021

Genera
- † Brachyscelio; † Cenomanoscelio; Neuroscelio

= Neuroscelionidae =

Neuroscelionidae Temporal range: Cenomanian–Recent

Family of wasps

Neuroscelionidae is a family of wasps in the superfamily Platygastroidea. It contains only one extant genus, Neuroscelio, with two other genera known from fossils. Members of Neuroscelio are known from Southeast Asia and Australia. Their hosts are unknown.

== Taxonomy ==
- †Brachyscelio Brues, 1940, Baltic amber, Rovno amber, Eocene
- †Cenomanoscelio Schlüter, 1978, Bezonnais amber, France, Late Cretaceous (Cenomanian)
- Neuroscelio Dodd, 1913
