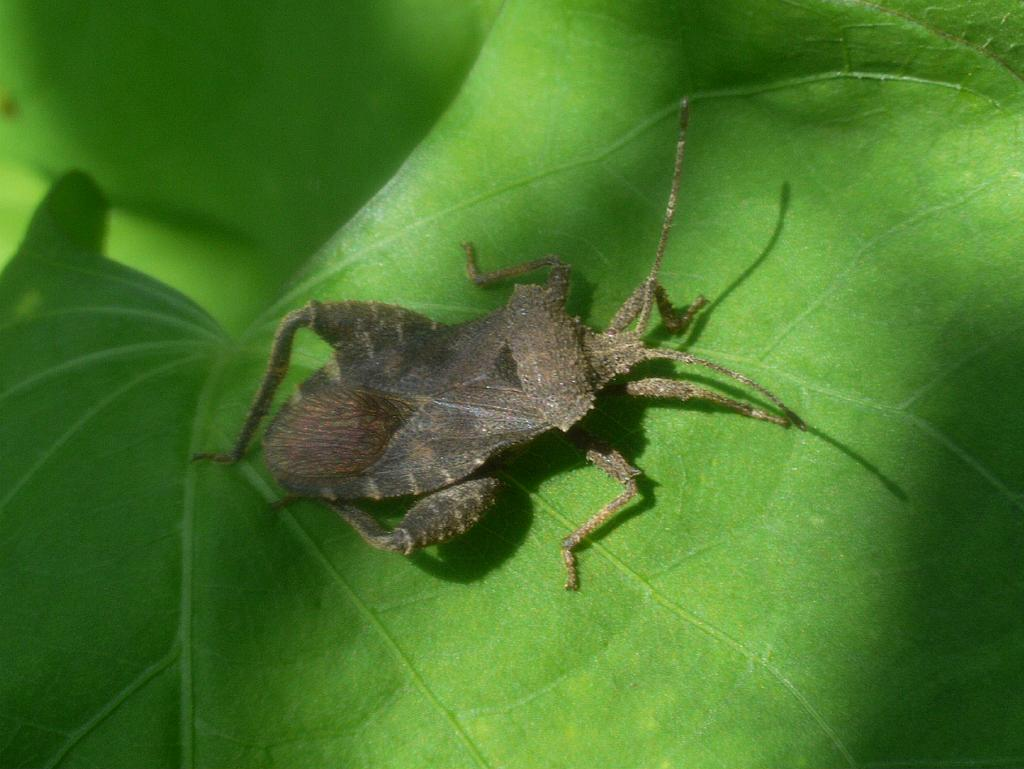
- Acanthocoris sordidus

Scientific classification
- Domain: Eukaryota
- Kingdom: Animalia
- Phylum: Arthropoda
- Class: Insecta
- Order: Hemiptera
- Suborder: Heteroptera
- Family: Coreidae
- Subfamily: Coreinae
- Tribe: Acanthocorini; Amyot & Serville, 1843

Synonyms
- Acanthocoreoidae Amyot & Serville, 1843; Acanthocorides Amyot & Serville, 1843; Physomeraria Stål, 1873; Physomerini Stål, 1873

= Acanthocorini =

Tribe of true bugs

The Acanthocorini are a tribe of leaf-footed bugs, in the subfamily Coreinae erected by Amyot and Serville in 1843. Genera are distributed from Africa, South-East Asia through to Australia.

== Genera ==
The Coreoidea Species File lists:

1. Acanthocoris Amyot & Serville, 1843
2. Antanambecoris Brailovsky, 2001
3. Choerommatus Amyot & Serville, 1843
4. Cordysceles Hsiao, 1963
5. Murtula Schouteden, 1912
6. Petalocnemis Stål, 1854
7. Phelaus Stål, 1866
8. Physomerus Burmeister, 1835
9. Pluotenia Brailovsky, 2001
10. Pomponatius Distant, 1904
11. Postleniatus Brailovsky, 2007
12. Rhyticoris Costa, 1863
13. Turrana Distant, 1911
