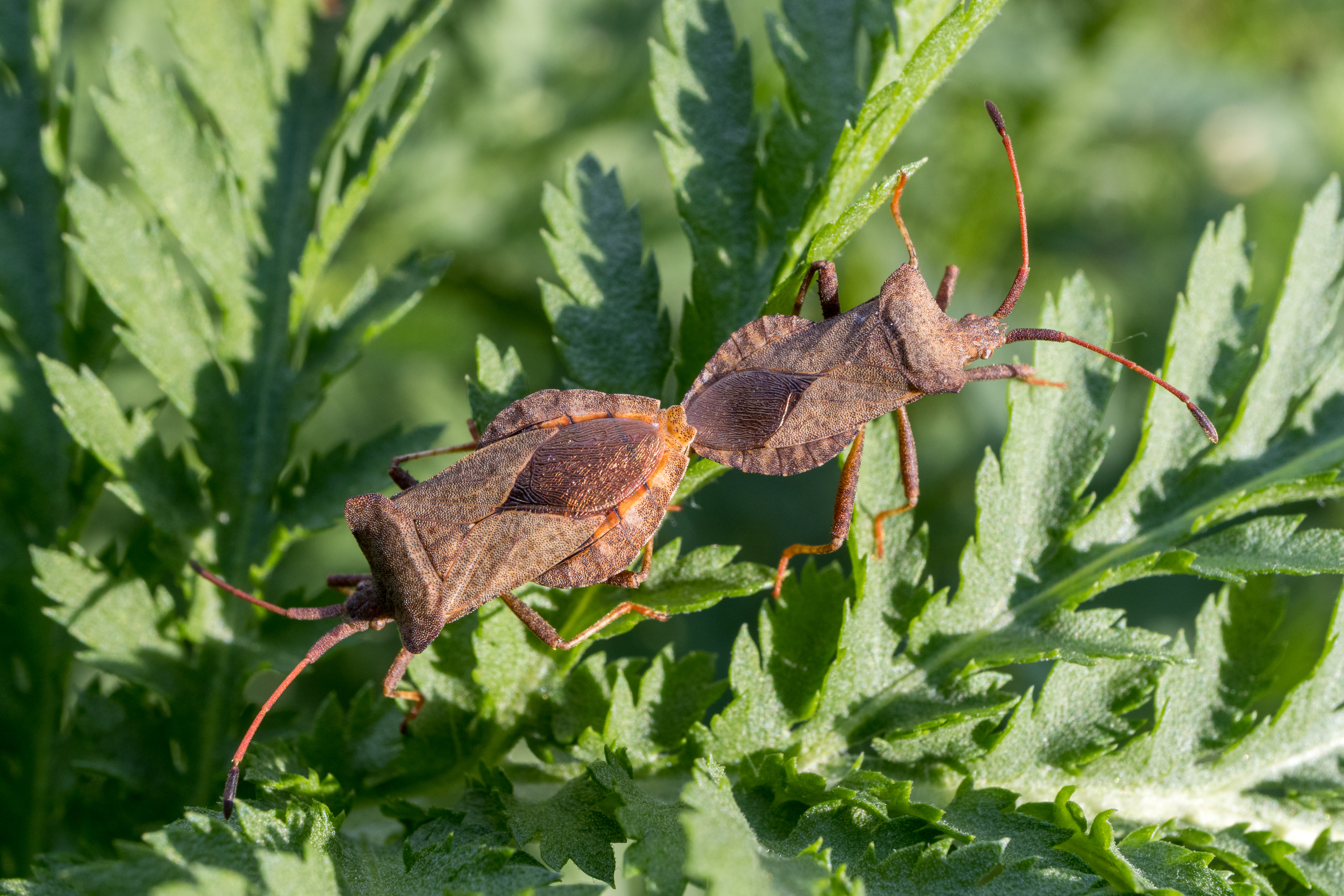
- Mating, Bulgaria

Scientific classification
- Kingdom: Animalia
- Phylum: Arthropoda
- Clade: Pancrustacea
- Class: Insecta
- Order: Hemiptera
- Suborder: Heteroptera
- Family: Coreidae
- Genus: Coreus
- Species: C. marginatus

Binomial name
- Coreus marginatus (Linnaeus, 1758)

Synonyms
- Cimex marginatus Linnaeus, 1758

= Coreus marginatus =

Species of true bug

Coreus marginatus is a herbivorous species of true bug in the family Coreidae. It is commonly known as the dock bug as it feeds on the leaves and seeds of docks and sorrels. It is a medium-sized speckled brown insect, between 13 and 15 mm long as an adult, with a broad abdomen. It occurs throughout Europe, Asia and northern Africa. It is often found in dense vegetation, such as hedgerows and wasteland.

== Taxonomy ==
This species was among the first Hemiptera formally described in the scientific literature by the Swedish biologist Carl Linnaeus in 1758, under the name Cimex marginatus. It was transferred to the genus Coreus by the Danish zoologist Johan Fabricius in 1794. It has numerous synonyms and was historically placed in the genus Syromastus.

The specific epithet marginatus refers to the prominent margins of the abdomen.

== Description ==
The head, pronotum and abdomen of an adult dock bug are speckled reddish brown. The antennae are composed of four segments, red-orange in colour except for the final fourth segment which is black. Between the antennae are two small projections, known as antenniferous tubercles, which can be used to distinguish this species from other superficially similar species. The pronotum has angular upward facing projections and the scutellum is clearly visible. The rounded edge of the abdomen has lighter coloured markings. Adults are between 13 and 15 millimetres (0.51 and 0.59 in) long and males are typically smaller than females but have longer antennae.

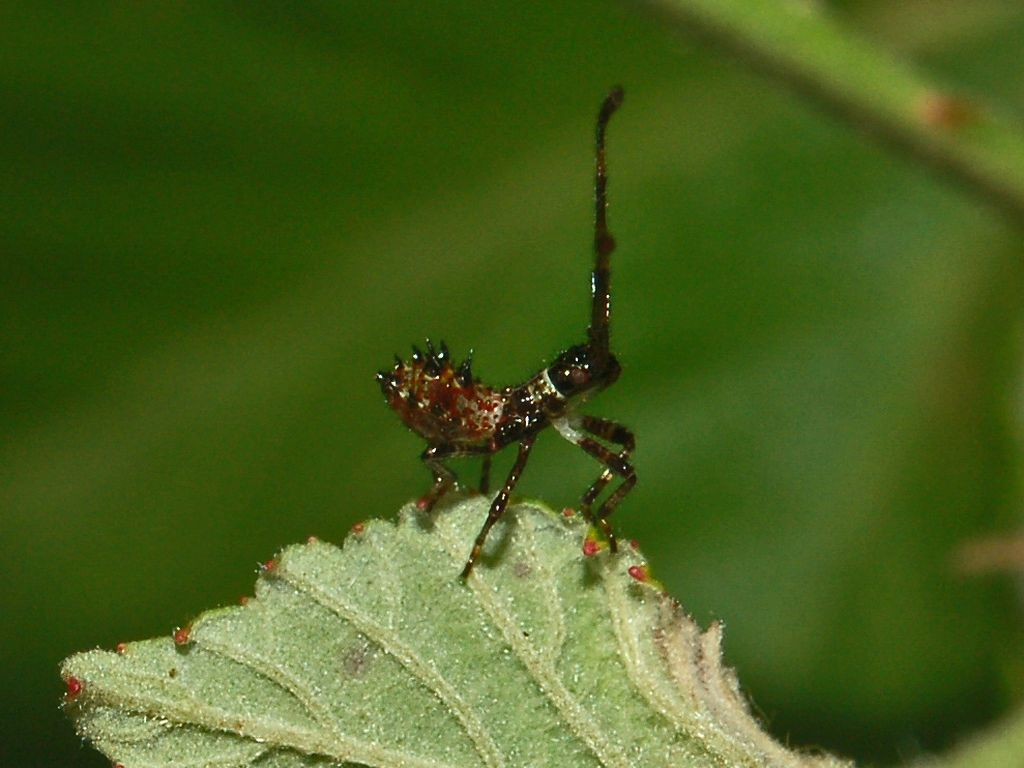
A young (instar II) nymph showing its spiny abdomen and disproportionately large antennae

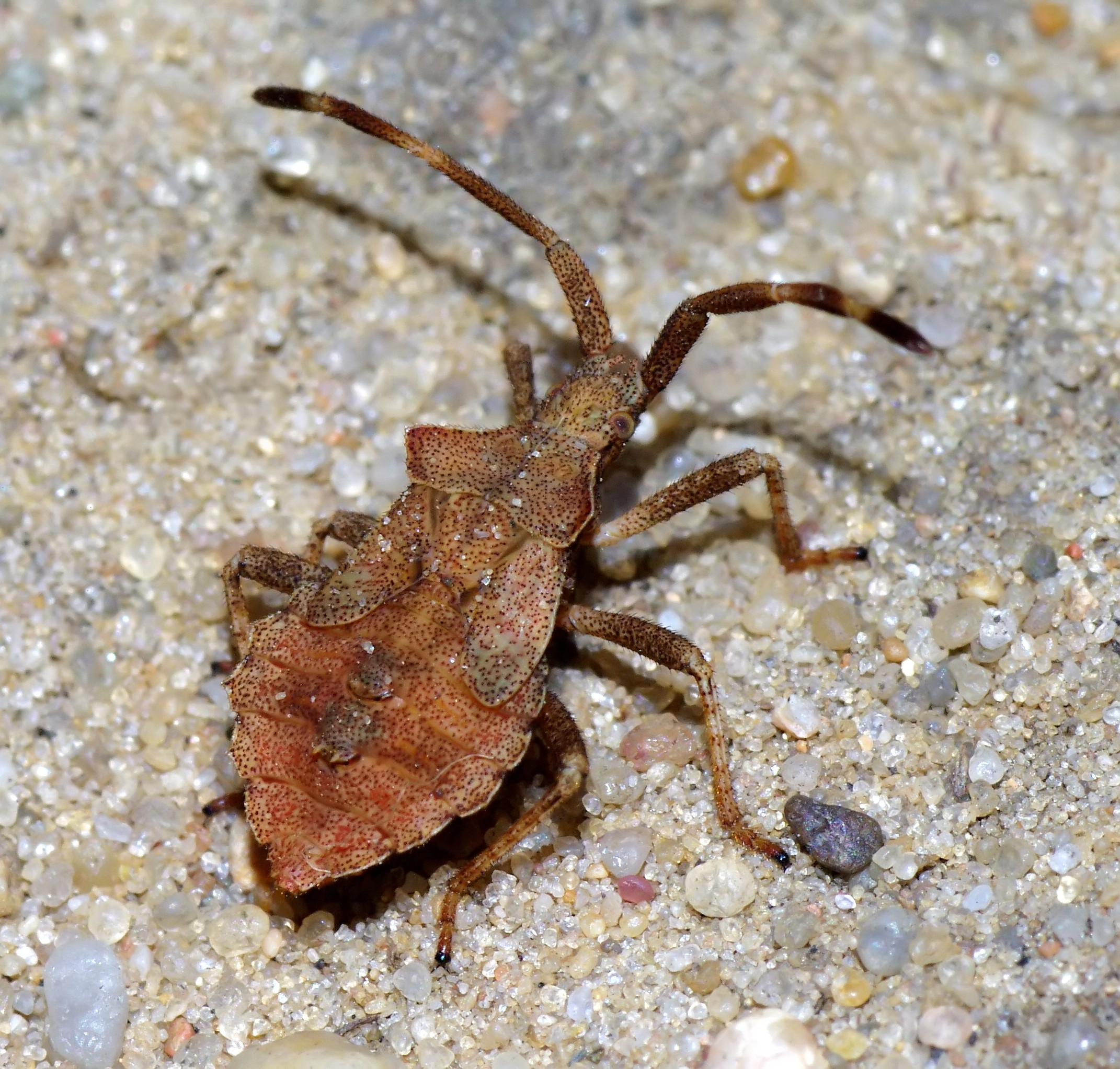
An older nymph with distinct abdominal scent glands and visible wingbuds (developing wings)

Young nymphs look different in appearance to the adults. They are heavily spined, less uniform in colouration and have disproportionately large antennae compared to their body size. Older nymphs look more similar to adults with a more uniform speckled brown colouration but lacking developed wings.

Like other Coreidae, Coreus marginatus has scent glands with small pores in the middle of its thorax which can release strong-smelling, irritating, volatile defensive chemicals when disturbed. The pores have an ultrastructure composed of mushroom-like structures that are connected to each other via ridges and Trabeculae. The chemical composition of the scent gland secretions is similar between males and females, although the relative proportions are different. In females the most prevalent chemical compound is hexanoic acid while in males it is stearic acid.

== Distribution ==
Linnaeus originally described the species from Europe with only one of his specimens having a specific locality of England. Other early specimens collected by Goeze are from France The current distribution is extensive and covers: Europe, from Portugal to Finland; Asia, from Russia to China; and Africa, known only from Algeria.

== Life cycle ==
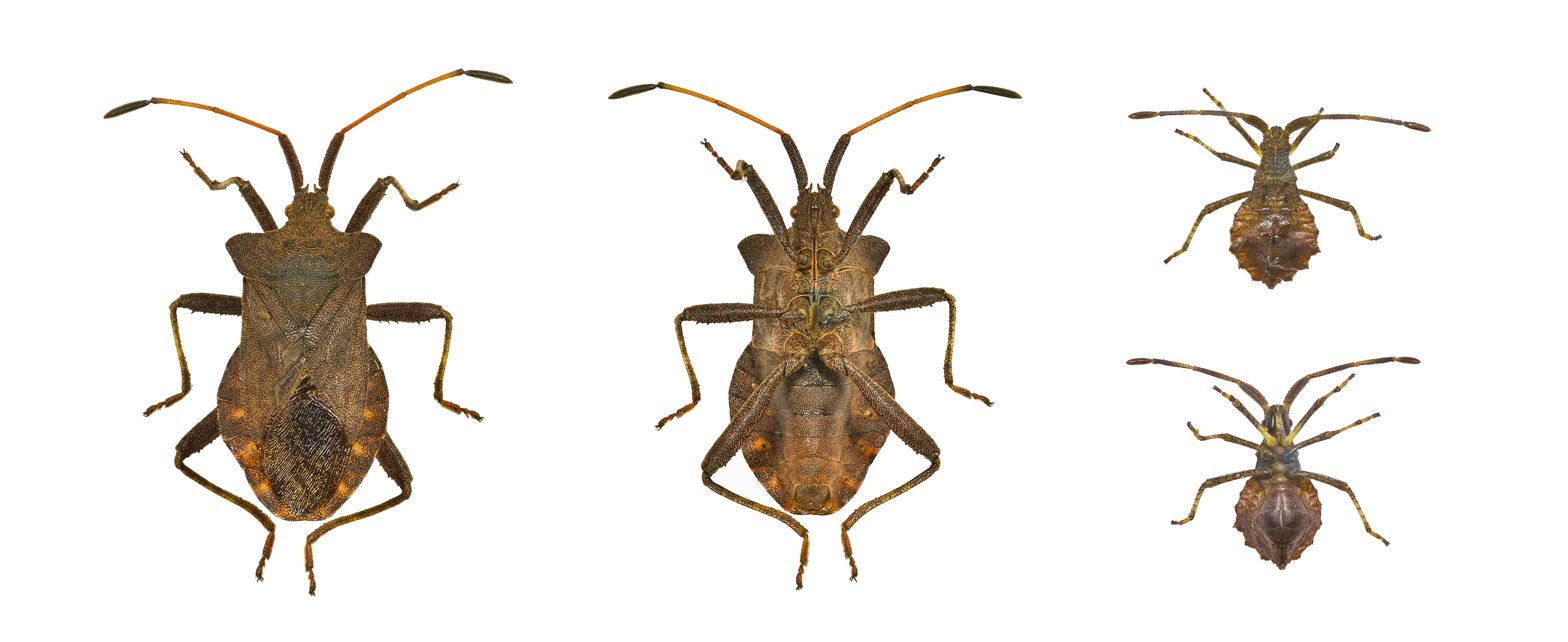
Adult male and nymph shown from dorsal and ventral views

Like other Coreidae the dock bug has an annual life cycle consisting of an egg followed by five successive nymphal instars before becoming an adult. It overwinters as an adult and copulates in the typical heteropteran back-to-back position, laying large brown eggs between late May and early July. The eggs take around 3 to 4 weeks to hatch. The young nymphs will feed on leaves and stems while the older nymphs, like the adults, feed on seeds. The nymphs mature to adults from August onwards.

== Diet ==
The dock bug is herbivorous and feeds on a wide variety of plants from different families. While the common name in English refers to its preferred diet of docks and sorrels and other plants in the family Polygonaceae, they also readily feed on certain species of Asteraceae and Rosaceae. Adults are known to feed on raspberry, gooseberry and sometimes blackcurrant.

== Gallery ==
Different views and lifestages of Coreus marginatus
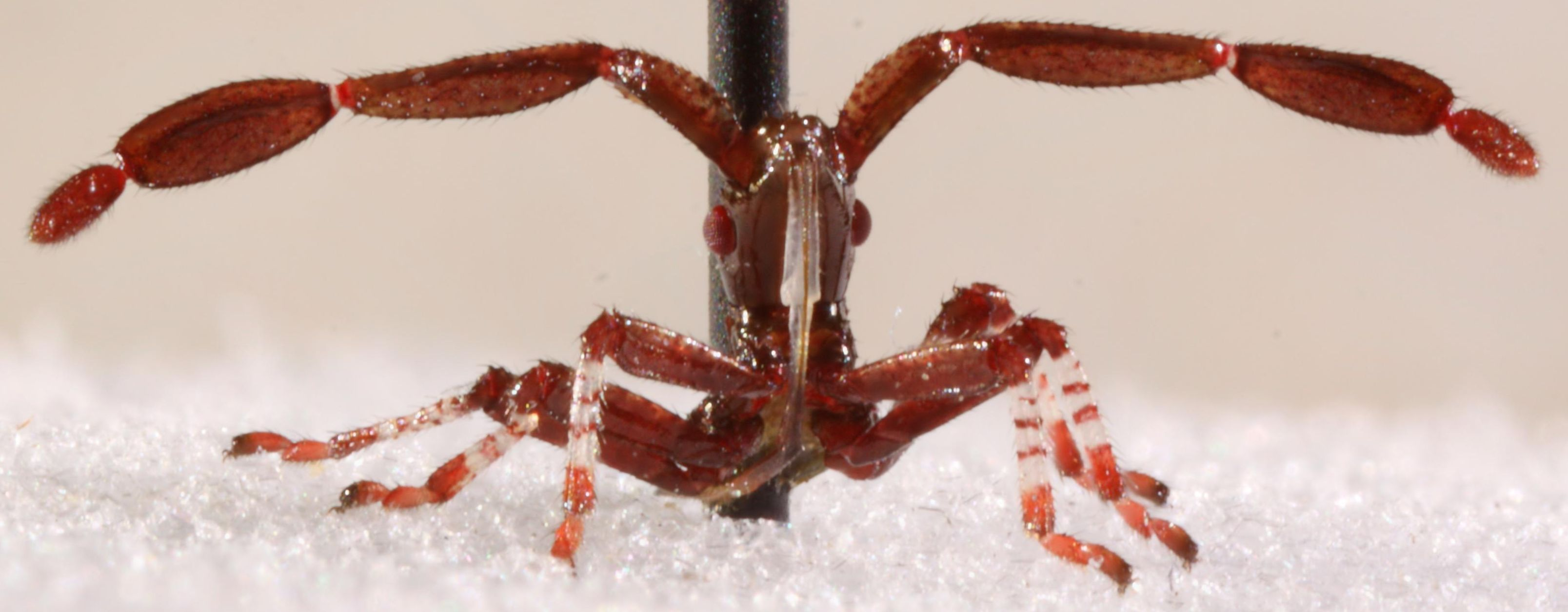
Newly hatched nymph of Coreus marginatus showing the comparatively very large antennae

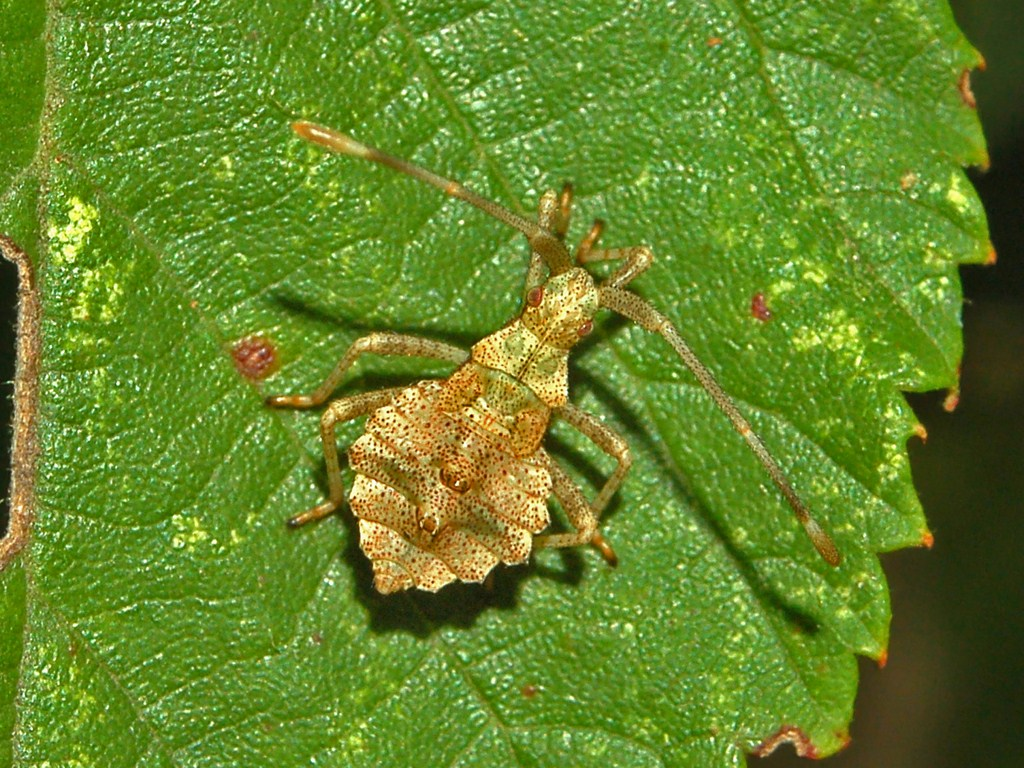
A pale-coloured nymph, indicating recent ecdysis.

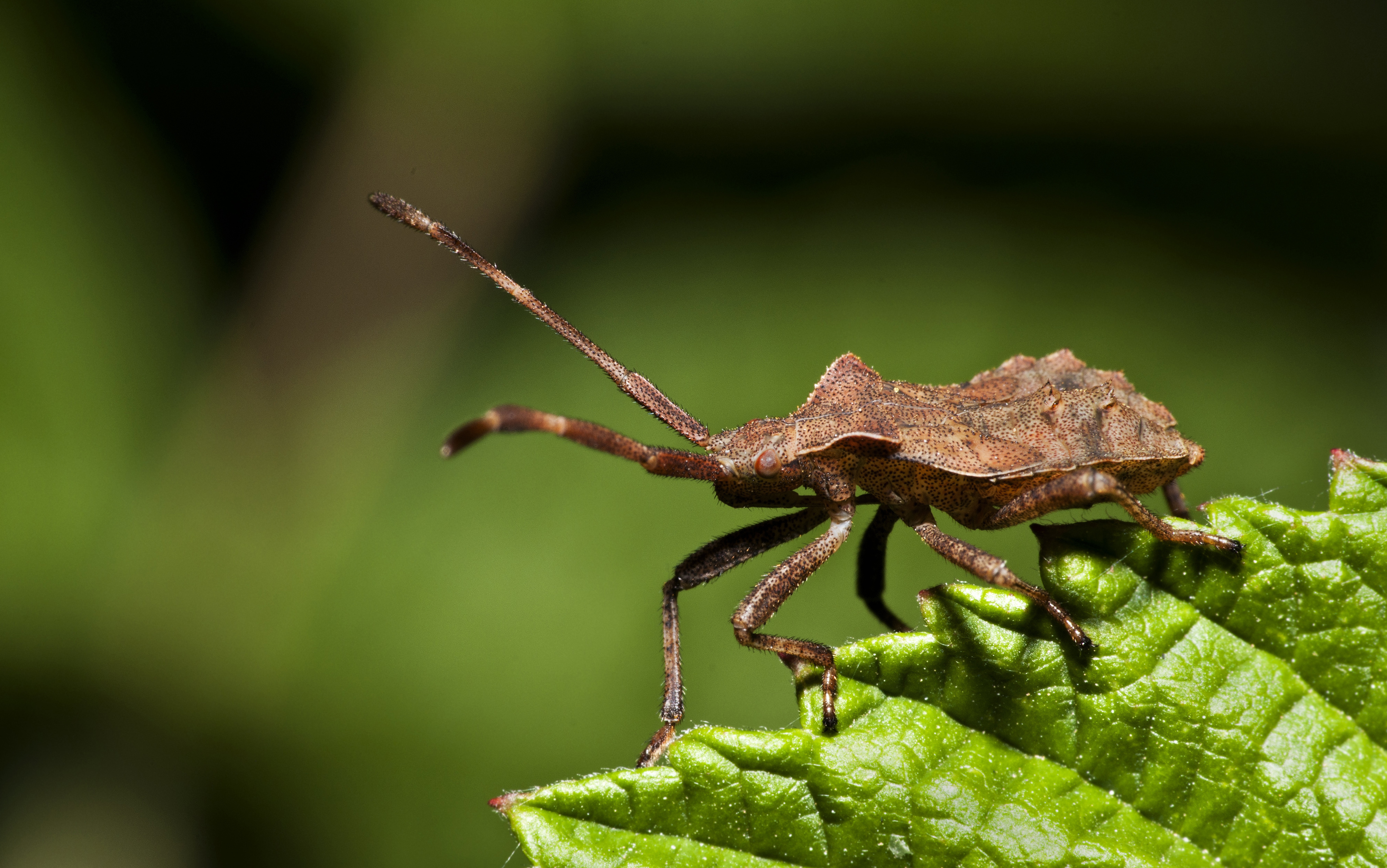
An older nymph showing similar colouration to the adult

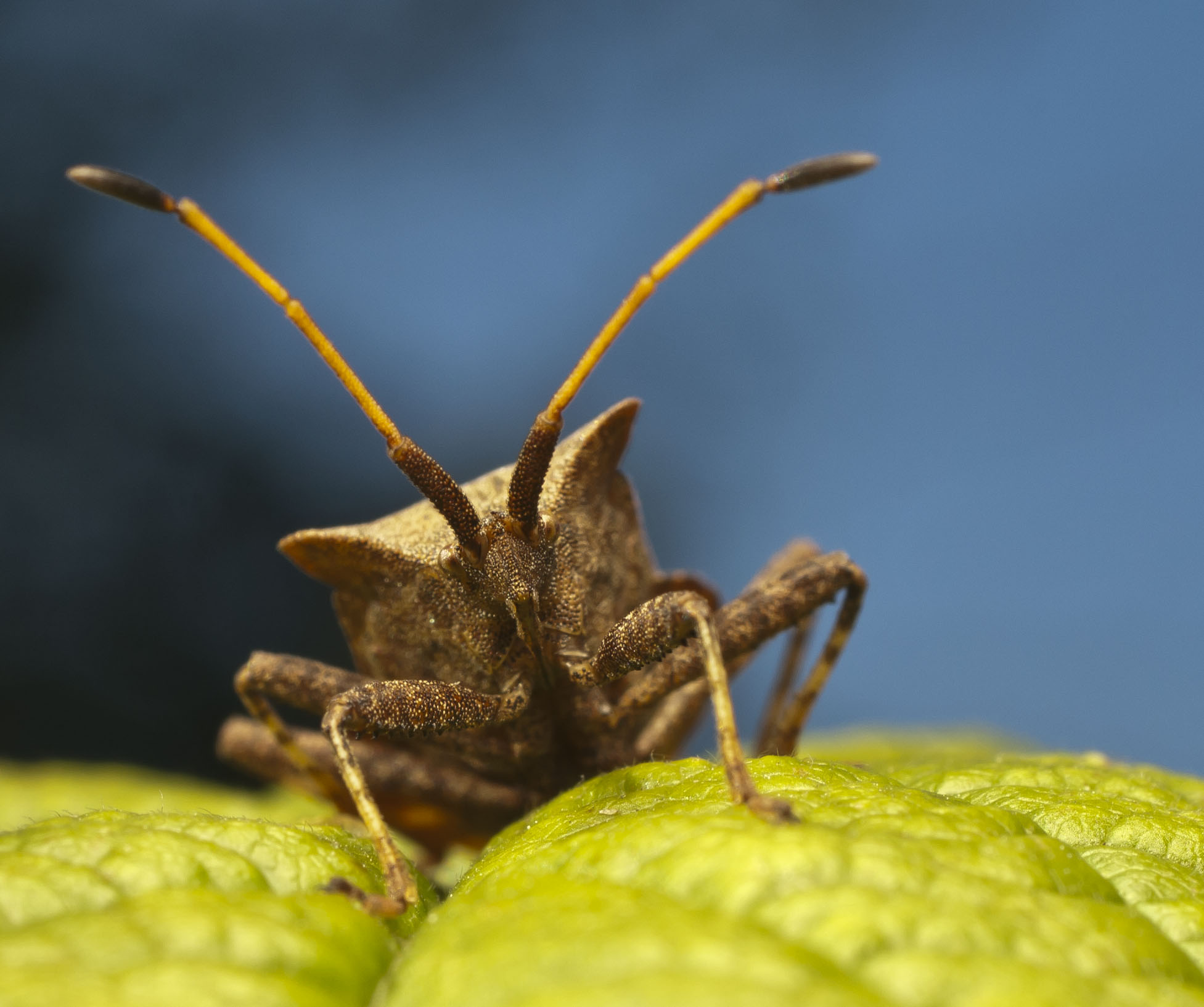
Facial view, showing the rostrum and distinctive orange antennae with black tips.

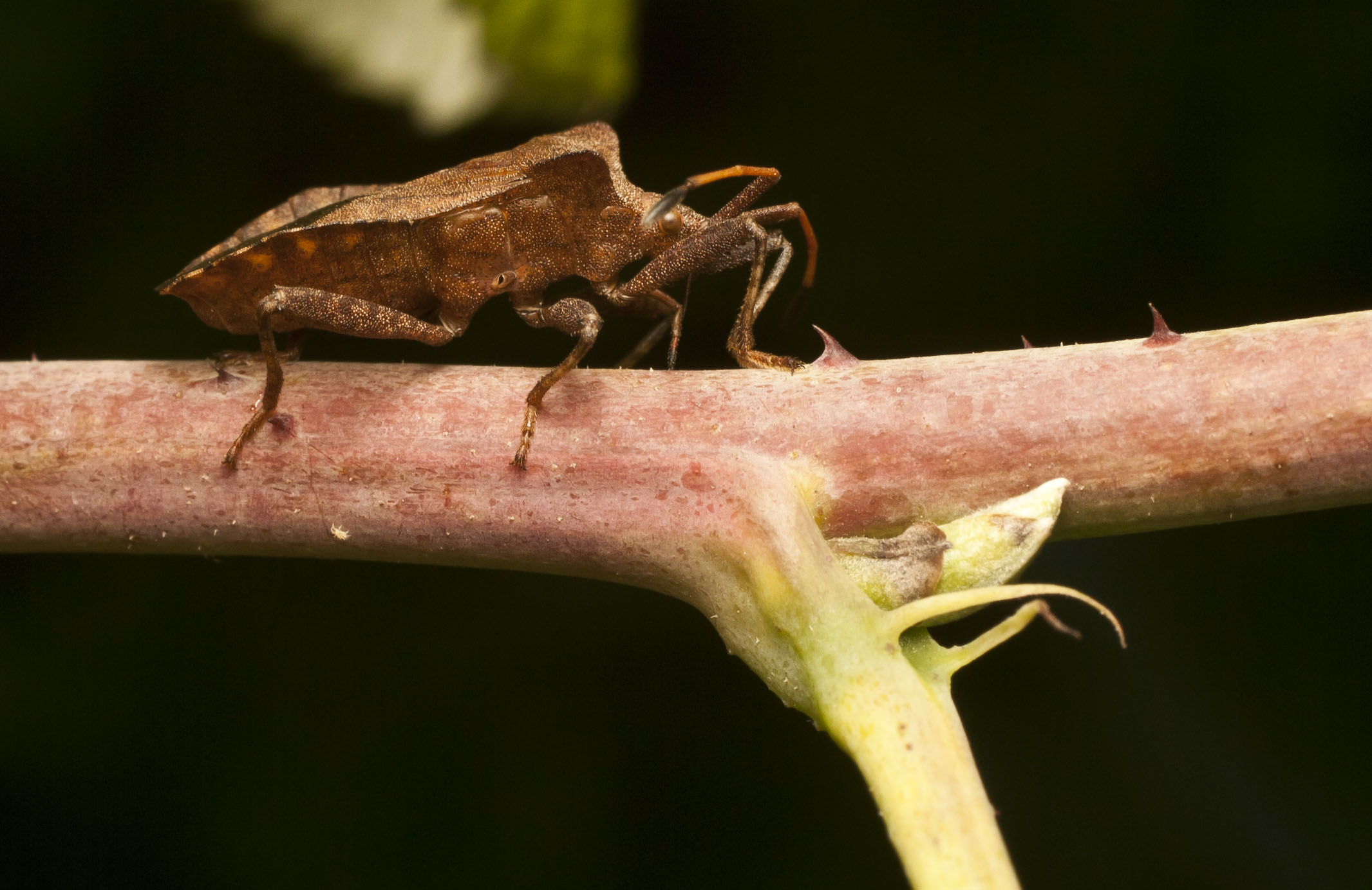
Coreus marginatus feeding on a plant stem

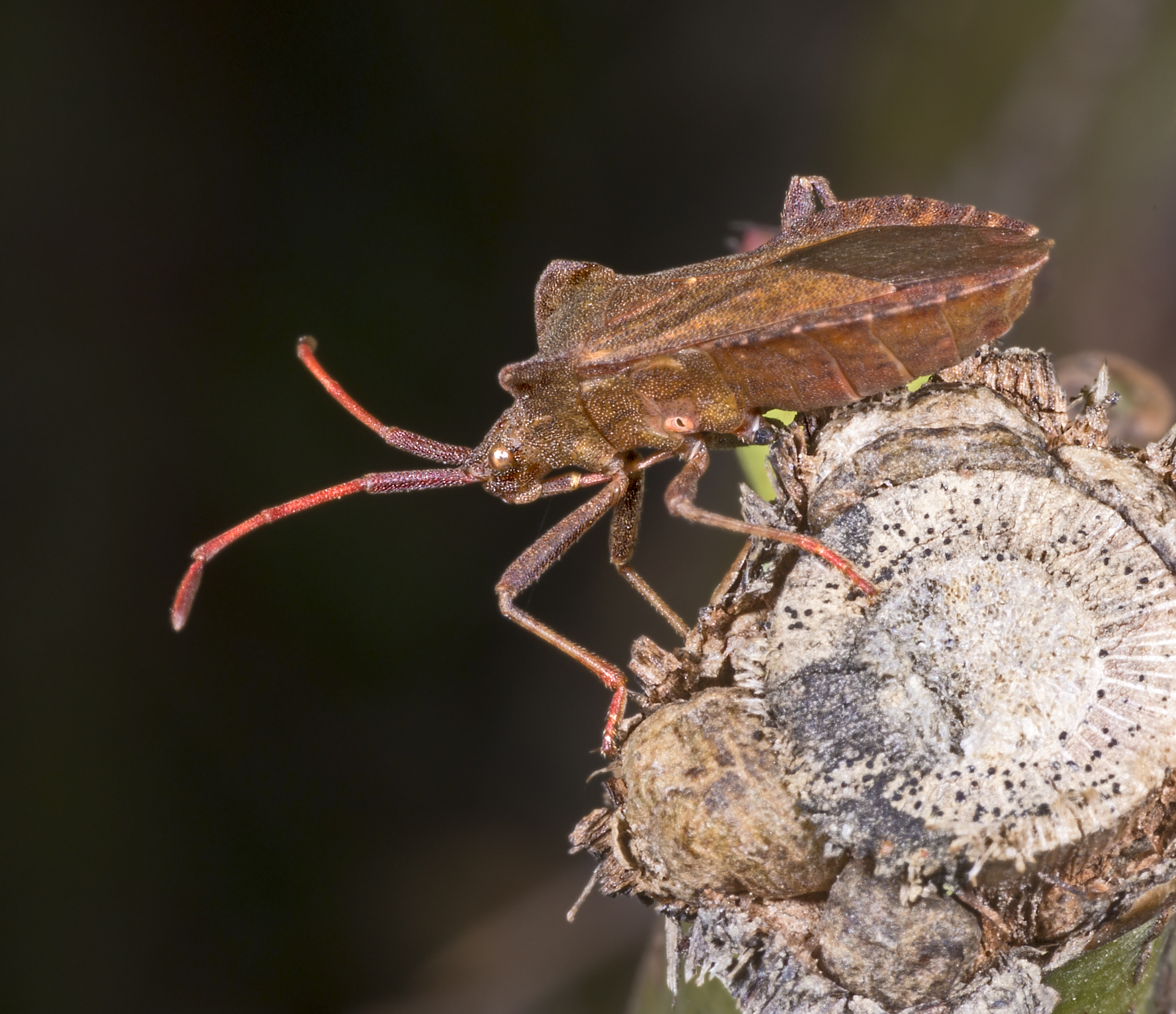
Lateral view, showing the opening of the scent gland.

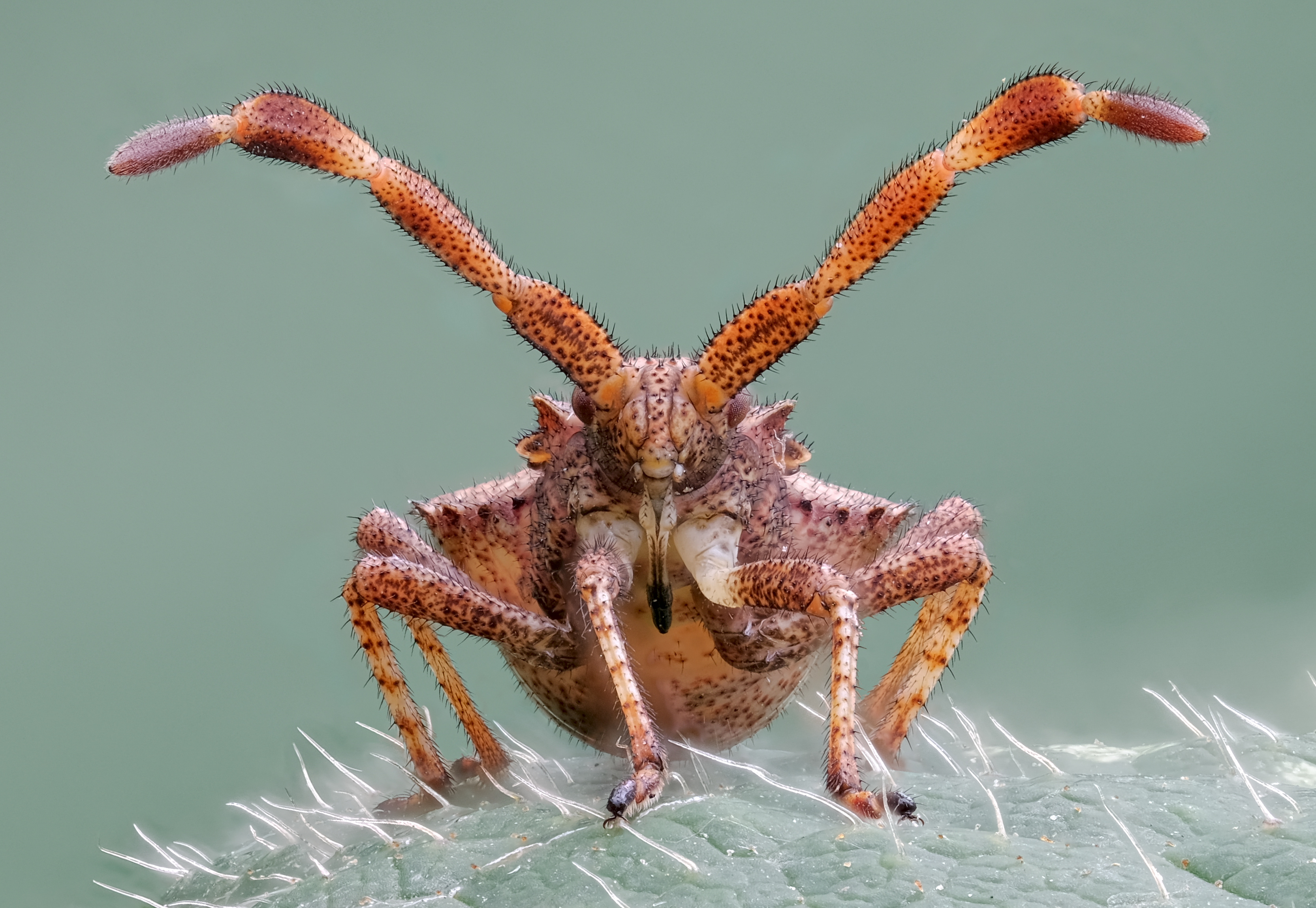
Frontal view, showing the antennae and proboscis.
