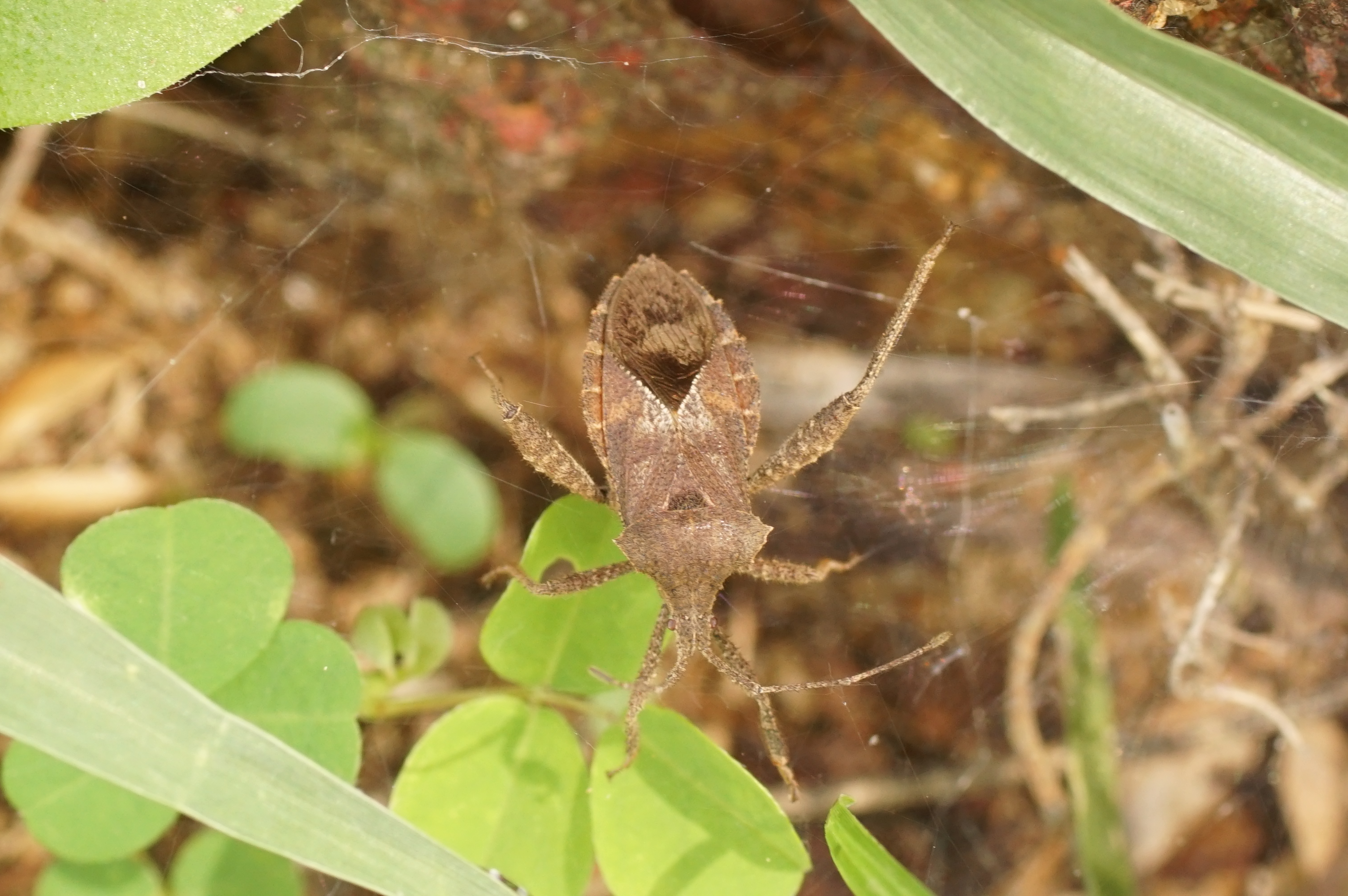

Scientific classification
- Domain: Eukaryota
- Kingdom: Animalia
- Phylum: Arthropoda
- Class: Insecta
- Order: Hemiptera
- Suborder: Heteroptera
- Family: Coreidae
- Genus: Acanthocoris
- Species: A. scabrator

Binomial name
- Acanthocoris scabrator (Fabricius, 1803)

= Acanthocoris scabrator =

Species of bug

Acanthocoris scabrator is a species commonly known as squash bugs. It is a known pest insect of squash, eggplant, mango, red pepper, and gooseberry, and lays eggs on Ipomoea carnea.
