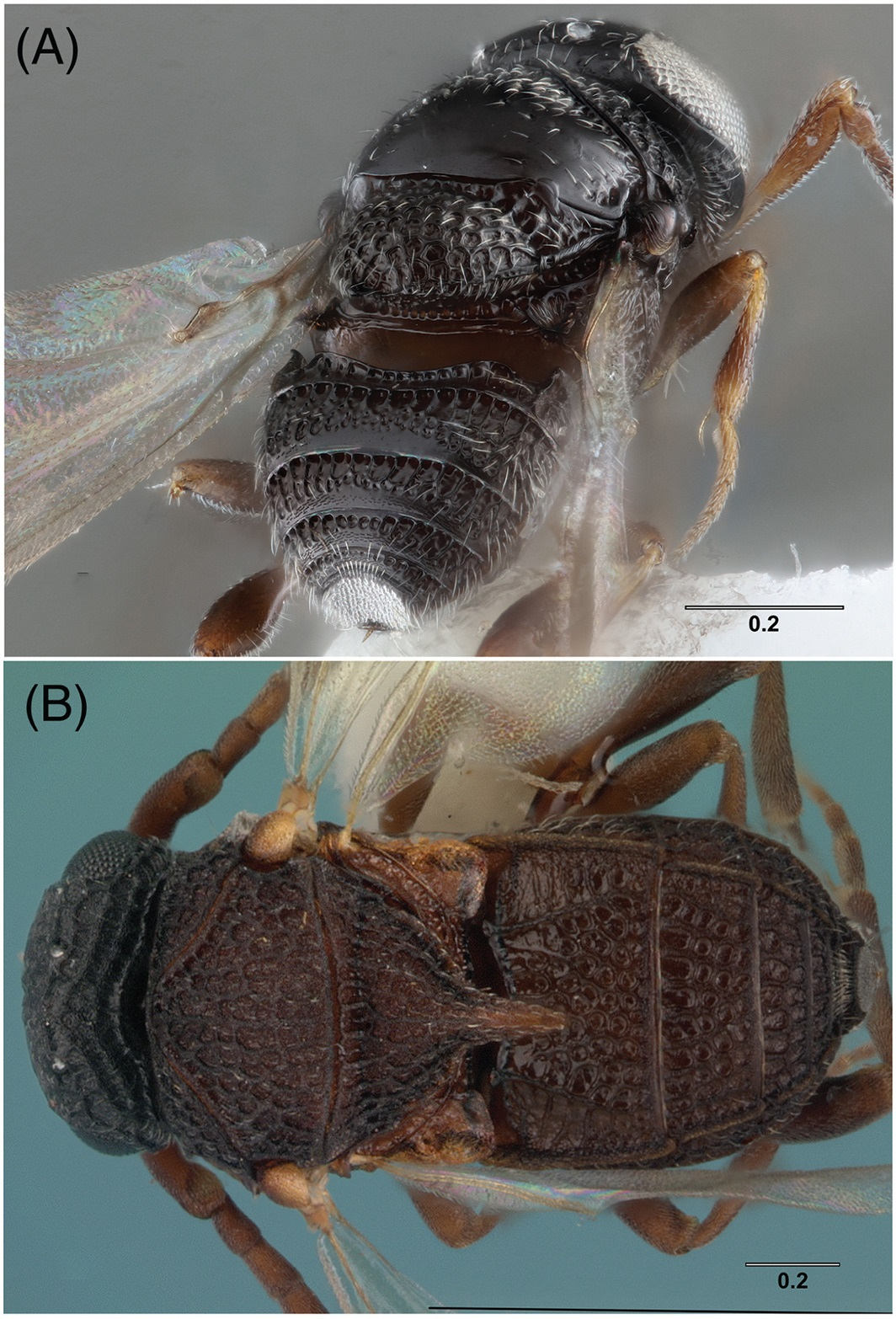
- Huddlestonium exu (top) Plaumannion fritzi (bottom)

Scientific classification
- Kingdom: Animalia
- Phylum: Arthropoda
- Clade: Pancrustacea
- Class: Insecta
- Order: Hymenoptera
- Superfamily: Platygastroidea
- Family: Geoscelionidae; Engel & Huang, 2017

Genera
- See text

= Geoscelionidae =

Geoscelionidae Temporal range: Cenomanian–Recent

Family of wasps

Geoscelionidae is a family of wasps in the superfamily Platygastroidea. It contains three extant species in two genera, native to South America and Africa, and several other genera known from fossils. It was originally erected as the tribe Geoscelionini within Scelionidae. It was raised to a full family in 2021.

== Taxonomy ==
- †Geoscelio Engel and Huang, 2016 (1 species) Burmese amber, Myanmar, Late Cretaceous (Cenomanian)
- †Archaeoscelio Brues, 1940 (2 species) Baltic amber, Eocene
- †Cobaloscelio Johnson and Masner, 2007 (2 species) Baltic amber, Eocene
- Plaumannion Masner & Johnson (2 species) southeastern Brazil and Venezuela
- Huddlestonium Polaszek & Johnson, 2007 (1 species) sub-Saharan Africa
