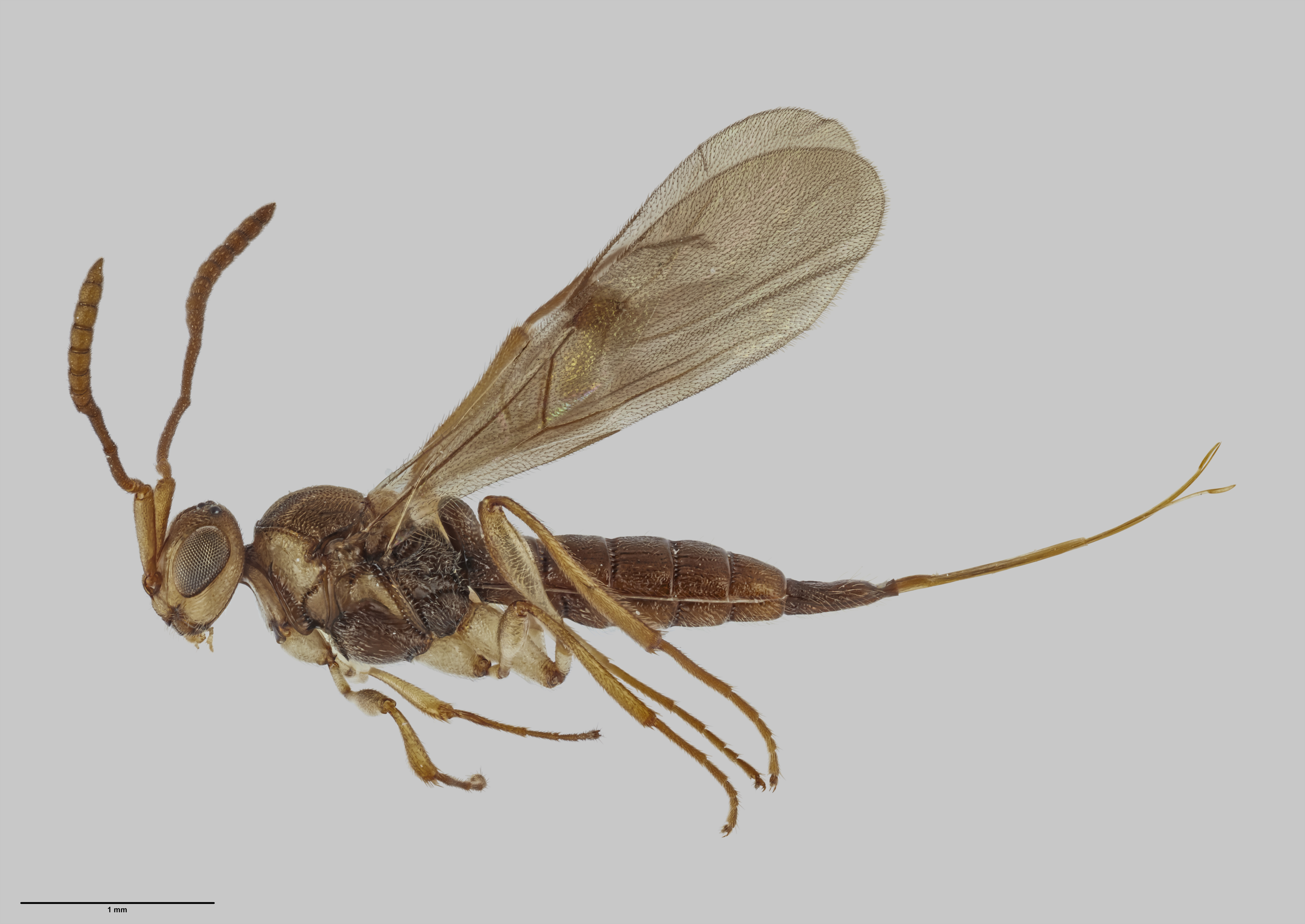
- Archaeoteleia gilbertae

Scientific classification
- Kingdom: Animalia
- Phylum: Arthropoda
- Clade: Pancrustacea
- Class: Insecta
- Order: Hymenoptera
- Superfamily: Platygastroidea
- Family: Sparasionidae; Dahlbom, 1858

Genera
- See text

= Sparasionidae =

Sparasionidae Temporal range: Cenomanian–Recent

Family of wasps

Sparasionidae is a family of wasps in the superfamily Platygastroidea. Known species are parasitoids of the eggs of orthopterans.

== Taxonomy ==
- Archaeoteleia Masner – Burmese amber, Late Cretaceous (Cenomanian) Baltic amber, Eocene – New Zealand, Chile, recent
- †Electroteleia Brues – Baltic amber, Eocene
- Mexon Masner & Johnson – Americas
- Listron Musetti & Johnson – Americas
- Sceliomorpha Ashmead – Americas
- Sparasion Latreille – Nearctic, Palearctic, Afrotropical and Oriental regions
