= Oethecoctonus oecanthi =

Scientific classification
- Kingdom: Animalia
- Phylum: Arthropoda
- Class: Insecta
- Order: Hymenoptera
- Family: Scelionidae
- Genus: Oethecoctonus
- Species: O. oecanthi

Binomial name
- Oethecoctonus oecanthi (Riley, 1893)

Species of wasp

Oethecoctonus oecanthi is a species of parasitoid wasp in the family Platygastridae.
