= Thoron (wasp) =

Scientific classification
- Kingdom: Animalia
- Phylum: Arthropoda
- Class: Insecta
- Order: Hymenoptera
- Family: Scelionidae
- Genus: Thoron; Haliday, 1833

Genus of wasps

Thoron is a genus of wasps in the family Scelionidae. There are about 10 described species in Thoron.

== Species ==
These 10 species belong to the genus Thoron:

- Thoron dayi Johnson & Masner, 2004
- Thoron dux Johnson & Masner, 2004
- Thoron garciai Johnson & Masner, 2004
- Thoron gibbus Ruthe, 1859
- Thoron lautus (Masner, 1972)
- Thoron longicornis Masner & Huggert, 1979
- Thoron metallicus Haliday, 1833
- Thoron rex Johnson & Masner, 2004
- Thoron rivalis Johnson & Masner, 2004
- Thoron spinifer Johnson & Masner, 2004

== See also ==
- List of Scelioninae genera
