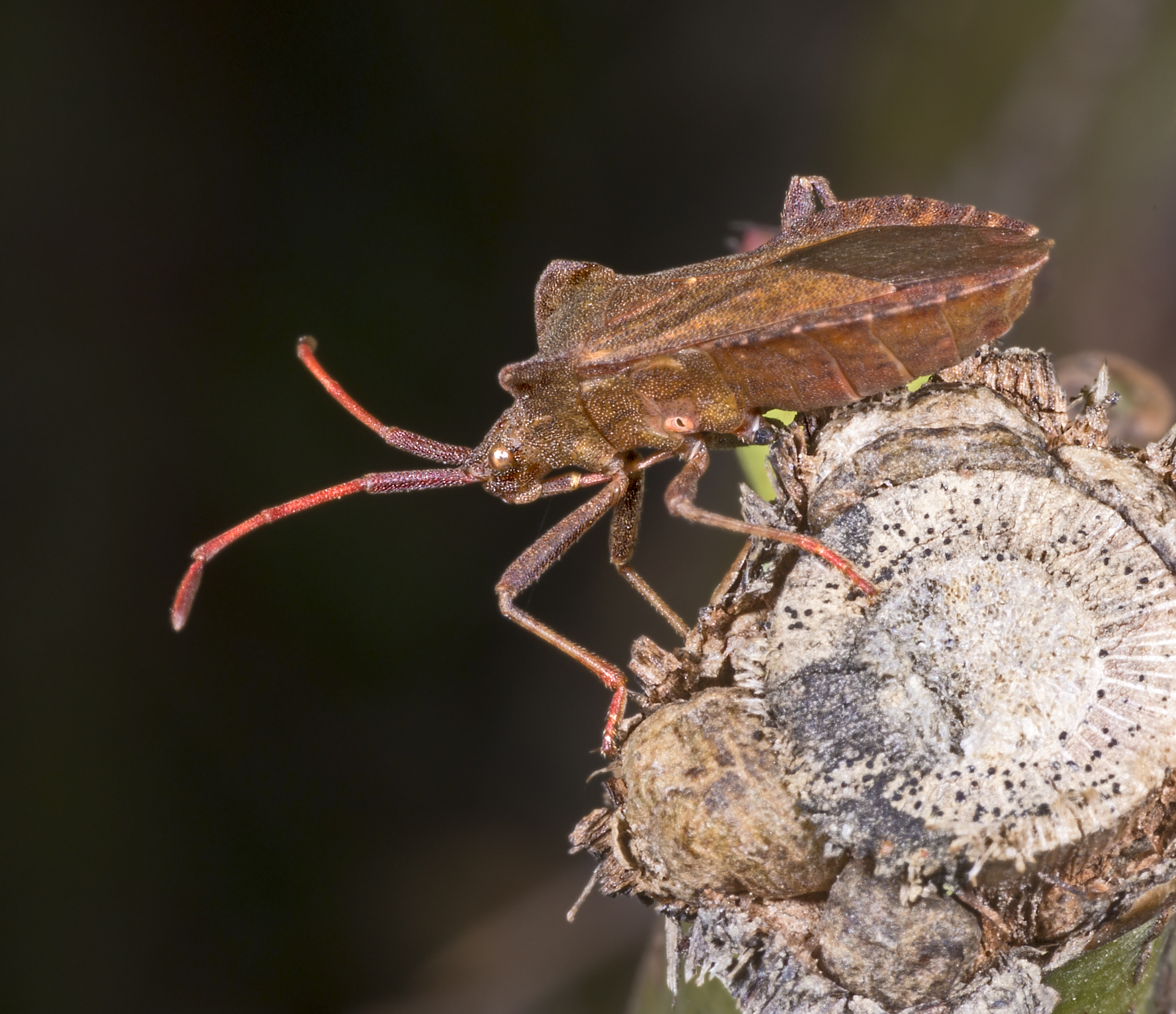
- Coreus marginatus on a bramble plant

Scientific classification
- Kingdom: Animalia
- Phylum: Arthropoda
- Clade: Pancrustacea
- Class: Insecta
- Order: Hemiptera
- Suborder: Heteroptera
- Family: Coreidae
- Subfamily: Coreinae
- Tribe: Coreini
- Genus: Coreus; Fabricius, 1794

Species
- See text

= Coreus =

Genus of true bugs

Coreus is a genus of leaf-footed bug in the Coreinae subfamily. It is the type genus for the Coreidae.

== Species ==
1. Coreus marginatus - type species: Palaearctic
2. Coreus spinigerus - N.E. China
