= Brachyscelio =

Brachyscelio Temporal range: Eocene

Scientific classification
- Domain: Eukaryota
- Kingdom: Animalia
- Phylum: Arthropoda
- Class: Insecta
- Order: Hymenoptera
- Family: Neuroscelionidae
- Genus: †Brachyscelio; Brues, 1940

Extinct genus of wasps

Brachyscelio is an extinct genus of wasps belonging to the family Neuroscelionidae, fossils have been found in Baltic and Rovno amber.

Species:

- Brachyscelio cephalotes Brues, 1940
- Brachyscelio dubius Brues, 1940
- Brachyscelio grandiculus Kononova & Simutnik, 2015
