= Anteris =

Scientific classification
- Kingdom: Animalia
- Phylum: Arthropoda
- Class: Insecta
- Order: Hymenoptera
- Family: Scelionidae
- Subfamily: Scelioninae
- Genus: Anteris; Förster, 1856

Genus of wasps

Anteris is a genus of wasps in the family Scelionidae. There are 12 described species in Anteris.

== Species ==
These 15 species belong to the genus Anteris:

- Anteris aethra (Walker, 1836)
- Anteris asramanes (Walker, 1836)
- Anteris bilineata Thomson, 1859
- Anteris brahmaranya (Mani, 1975)
- Anteris flebilis (Nixon, 1933)
- Anteris indica Sharma, 1978
- Anteris nigriclavata (Ashmead, 1905)
- Anteris perplexa (Kieffer, 1908)
- Anteris pinguis (Nixon, 1933)
- Anteris scutellaris Thomson, 1859
- Anteris simulans Kieffer, 1908
- Anteris szelenyii (Szabó, 1958)
