= Marshalliella =

Scientific classification
- Kingdom: Animalia
- Phylum: Arthropoda
- Class: Insecta
- Order: Hymenoptera
- Family: Platygastridae
- Genus: Marshalliella; Kieffer, 1913
- Species: M. oxygaster

Binomial name
- Marshalliella oxygaster Marshall, 1914

Genus of wasps

Marshalliella is a monotypic genus of wasps belonging to the family Platygastridae. The only species is Marshalliella oxygaster.
