= Oethecoctonus =

Scientific classification
- Kingdom: Animalia
- Phylum: Arthropoda
- Class: Insecta
- Order: Hymenoptera
- Family: Scelionidae
- Subfamily: Scelioninae
- Genus: Oethecoctonus; Ashmead, 1893

Genus of wasps

Oethecoctonus is a genus of parasitoid wasps in the family Scelionidae. There are about six described species in Oethecoctonus.

== Species ==
These six species belong to the genus Oethecoctonus:

- Oethecoctonus insularis (Ashmead, 1894)
- Oethecoctonus laticinctus (Ashmead, 1894)
- Oethecoctonus oecanthi (Riley, 1893)
- Oethecoctonus ophrynopus Masner, 1983
- Oethecoctonus pleuralis Masner, 1983
- Oethecoctonus rufus (Kieffer, 1910)
