= Aradophagus =

Scientific classification
- Domain: Eukaryota
- Kingdom: Animalia
- Phylum: Arthropoda
- Class: Insecta
- Order: Hymenoptera
- Family: Platygastridae
- Genus: Aradophagus; Ashmead, 1893

Genus of wasps

Aradophagus is a genus of wasps belonging to the family Platygastridae.

The genus has almost cosmopolitan distribution.

Species:

- Aradophagus brunneus (Masner & Huggert, 1979)
- Aradophagus diazi Garcia & Masner, 1994
- Aradophagus fasciatus Ashmead, 1893
- Aradophagus microps Masner & Huggert, 1979
- Aradophagus nicolai Mineo & Caleca, 1992
- Aradophagus pulchricornis Masner & Huggert, 1979
- Aradophagus pulchricorpus (Dodd, 1915)
- Aradophagus pulchripennis (Dodd, 1914)
- Aradophagus sarotes (Masner & Huggert, 1979)
- Aradophagus squamosus (Dodd, 1926)
- Aradophagus trjapitzini (Masner & Huggert, 1979)
