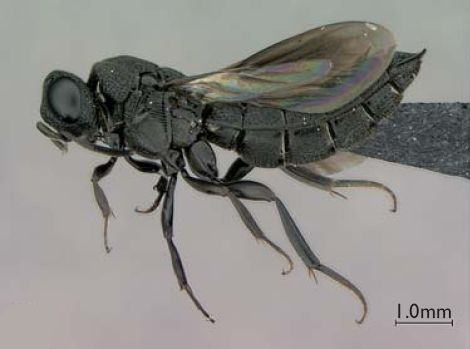

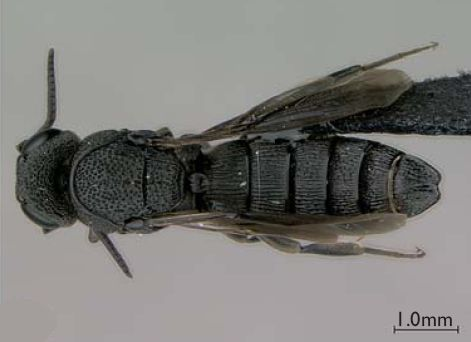
- Nixonia mcgregori in lateral (top) and dorsal views

Scientific classification
- Kingdom: Animalia
- Phylum: Arthropoda
- Clade: Pancrustacea
- Class: Insecta
- Order: Hymenoptera
- Superfamily: Platygastroidea
- Family: Nixoniidae; Chen et al. 2021
- Genus: Nixonia; Masner, 1976

= Nixonia =

Genus of wasps

Nixonia is a genus of wasps. It is the only member of the family Nixoniidae in the superfamily Platygastroidea. They are amongst the largest of the platygastroids at up to 9 mm in length. Members of the genus are known from Africa, the Indian subcontinent and Southeast Asia. The biology of only one species is known, which parasitizes orthopteran eggs.

== Taxonomy ==
- Nixonia atra Masner, 1970
- Nixonia bini Johnson & Masner, 2006
- Nixonia corrugata Johnson & Masner, 2006
- Nixonia elongata Johnson & Masner, 2006
- Nixonia flavocincta Johnson & Masner, 2006
- Nixonia gigas Johnson & Masner, 2006
- Nixonia krombeini Johnson & Masner, 2006
- Nixonia lamorali Johnson & Masner, 2006
- Nixonia masneri van Noort & Johnson, 2009
- Nixonia mcgregori van Noort & Johnson, 2009
- Nixonia pecki Johnson & Masner, 2006
- Nixonia pretiosa Masner, 1958 .
- Nixonia priesneri Johnson & Masner, 2006
- Nixonia sicaria Johnson & Masner, 2006
- Nixonia stygica Johnson & Masner, 2006
- Nixonia watshami Johnson & Masner, 2006
