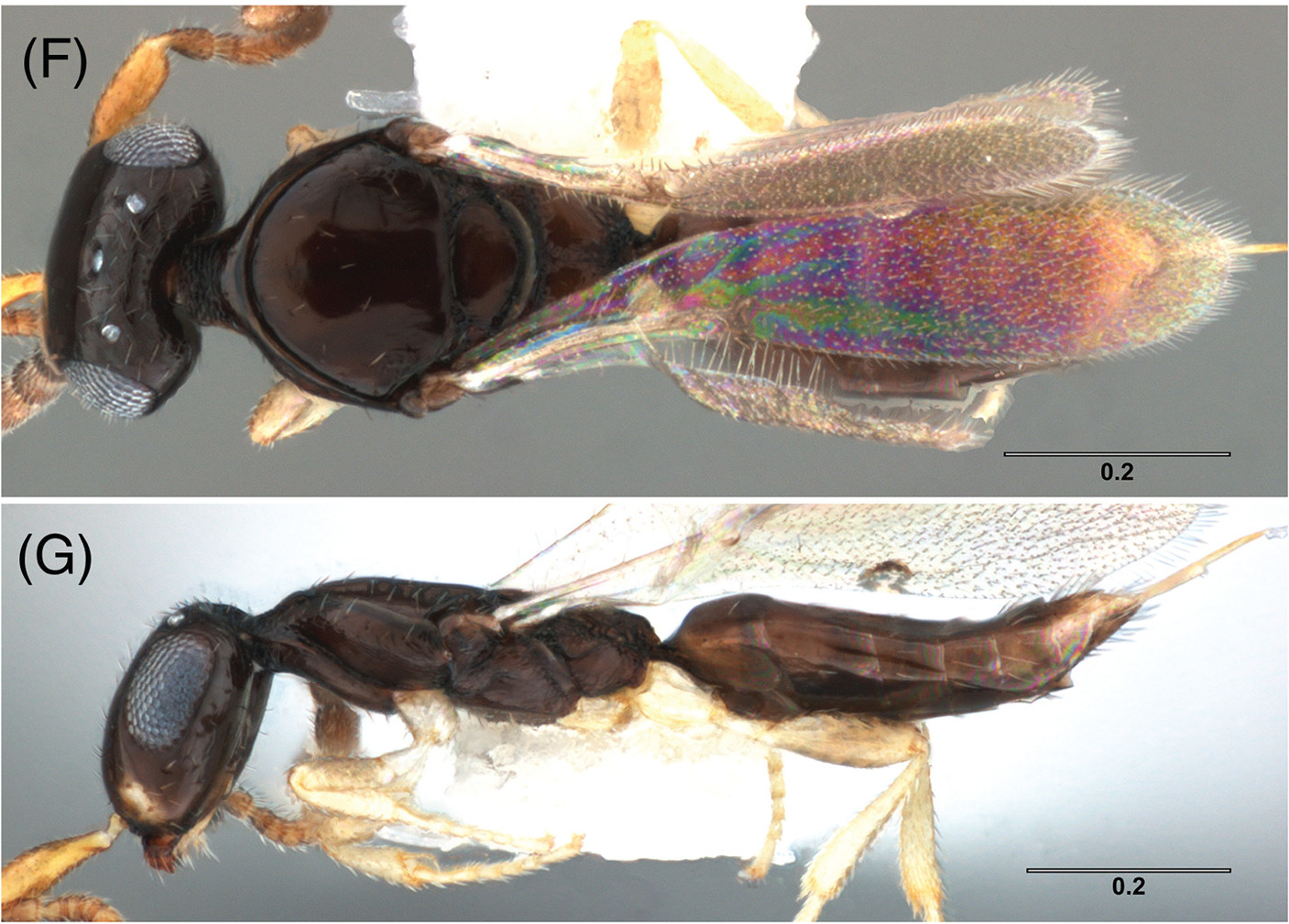

Scientific classification
- Kingdom: Animalia
- Phylum: Arthropoda
- Clade: Pancrustacea
- Class: Insecta
- Order: Hymenoptera
- Infraorder: Proctotrupomorpha
- Superfamily: Platygastroidea
- Family: Janzenellidae; Johnson & Austin, 2021
- Genus: Janzenella; Masner & Johnson, 2007

Type species
- Janzenella innupta Masner & Johnson, 2007

Other species
- †Janzenella theia Bremer et al., 2021

= Janzenella =

Janzenella Temporal range: Eocene–Recent

Genus of wasps

Janzenella is a genus of wasp, the only member of the family Janzenellidae within the superfamily Platygastroidea. It contains only a single living species, Janzenella innupta, which has only been collected in Costa Rica. Fossil members of the living species have also been described from Miocene aged Dominican amber. A Late Eocene fossil species, Janzenella theia is known from specimens entombed in Baltic amber.
