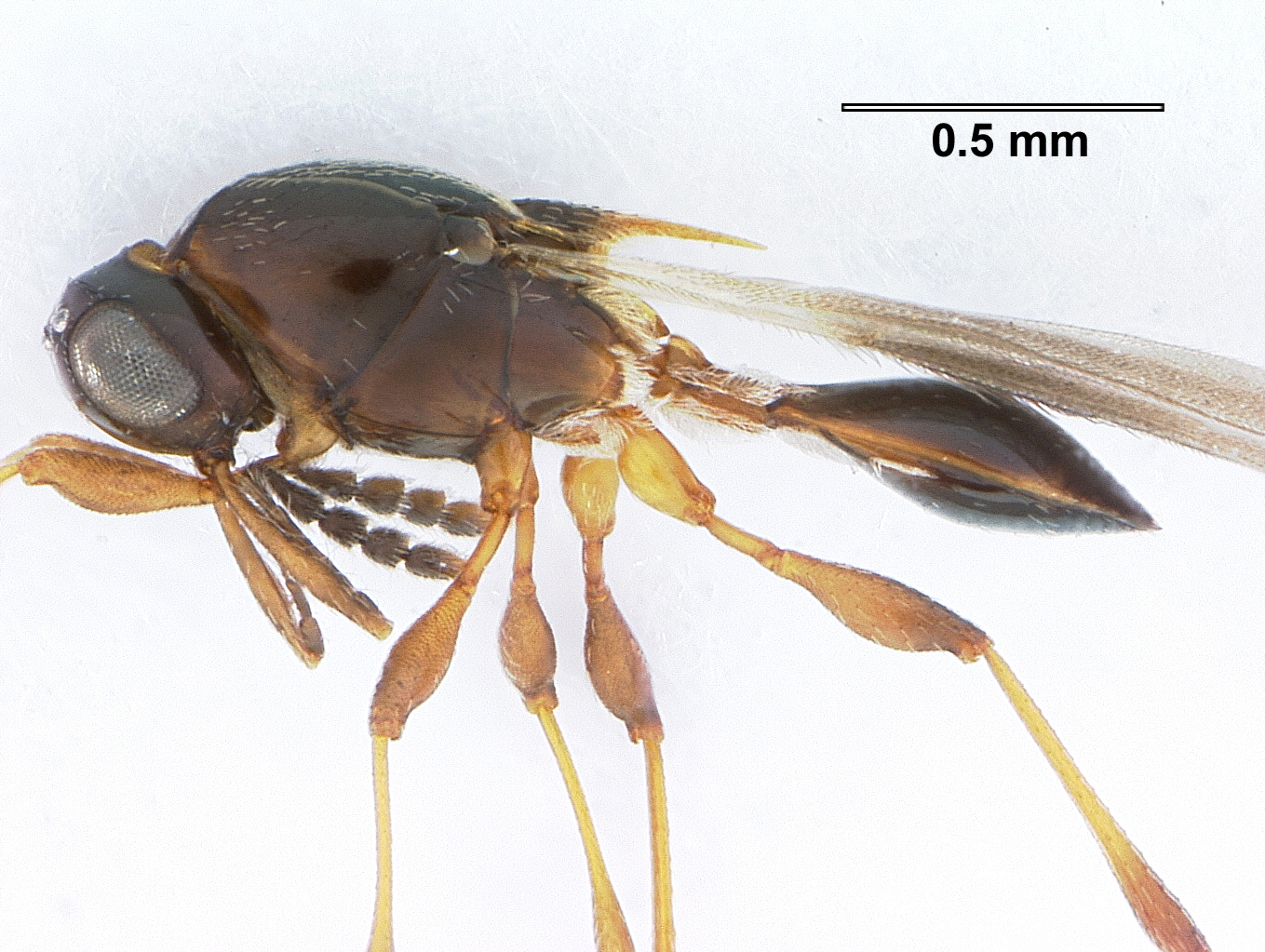
- A platygastrid wasp (Leptacis sp.)

Scientific classification
- Kingdom: Animalia
- Phylum: Arthropoda
- Clade: Pancrustacea
- Class: Insecta
- Order: Hymenoptera
- Infraorder: Proctotrupomorpha
- Superfamily: Platygastroidea

Families
- Geoscelionidae; Janzenellidae; Neuroscelionidae; Nixoniidae; Platygastridae; †Proterosceliopsidae; Scelionidae; Sparasionidae

= Platygastroidea =

Platygastroidea Temporal range: Barremian–Present

Superfamily of wasps

Platygastroidea is a superfamily of parasitoid wasps with more than 4400 described species, but it is estimated that there may be a total of about 10 000 species worldwide.

These are mostly very small (1-2.5 mm) wasps although some species are as small as 0.5 mm, with others being up to 12 mm long. Most are solitary endoparasites of insect and spider eggs. Their gross morphology (habitus) is diverse as it depends largely on the shape and size of the host egg - their bodies range from short and stocky to thin and elongated.

== Systematics ==
The superfamily has often been treated as a lineage within the superfamily Proctotrupoidea, but most classifications since 1977 have recognized it as an independent group within the Proctotrupomorpha.

The family Scelionidae was briefly considered to be a subfamily of the Platygastridae, though subsequent analyses have reversed this decision. Chen et al (2021) recognizes eight families, including five new extant families (Geoscelionidae, Janzenellidae, Neuroscelionidae, Nixoniidae, and Sparasionidae) and one extinct family †Proterosceliopsidae, known from fossils found in Cretaceous amber. Members of the group are known from the Early Cretaceous to present. The ancestral hosts of the group are orthopterans, with various lineages switching hosts to other insects.

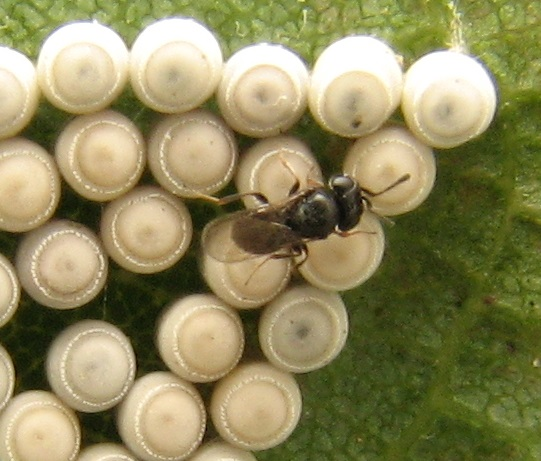
Trissolcus (family Scelionidae) on Chinavia eggs
