= Roena =

Roena is a surname and given name. Notable people with the name include:

surname

- Roberto Roena (1940–2021), Puerto Rican salsa music percussionist, orchestra leader, and dancer

given name

- Roena Muckelroy Savage (1904–1991), American concert soprano, voice educator, and choir director
