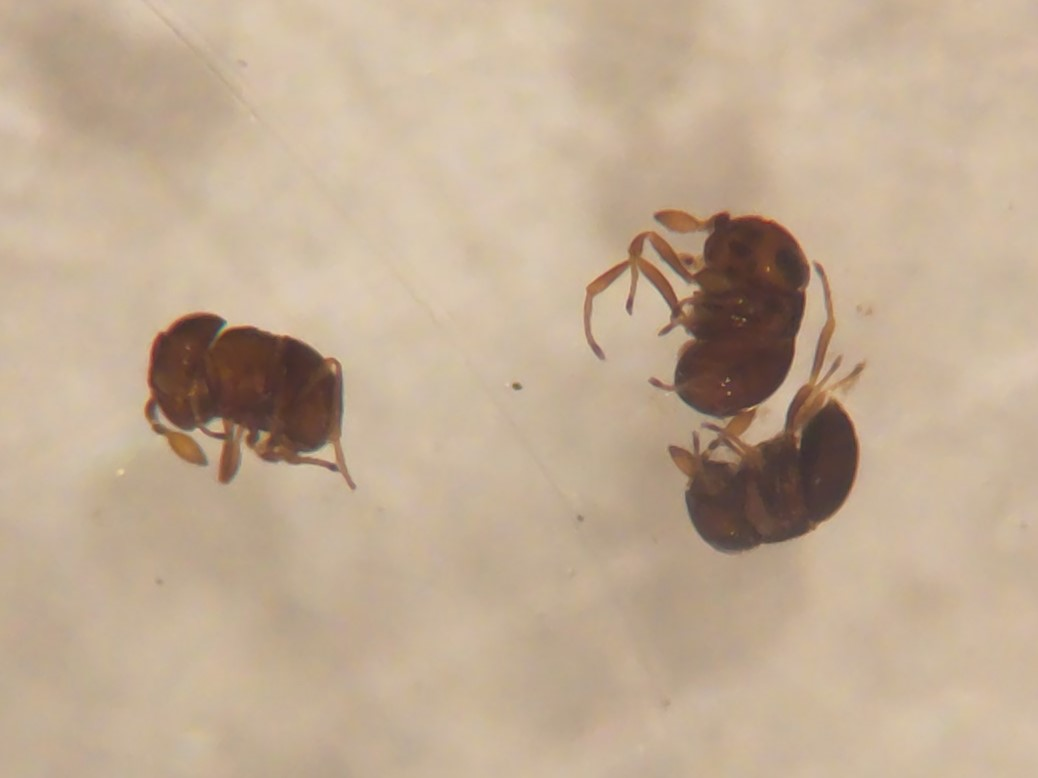
- Three female Baeus wasps under the microscope.

Scientific classification
- Kingdom: Animalia
- Phylum: Arthropoda
- Clade: Pancrustacea
- Class: Insecta
- Order: Hymenoptera
- Family: Scelionidae
- Subfamily: Scelioninae
- Genus: Baeus; Haliday, 1833

= Baeus =

Genus of wasps

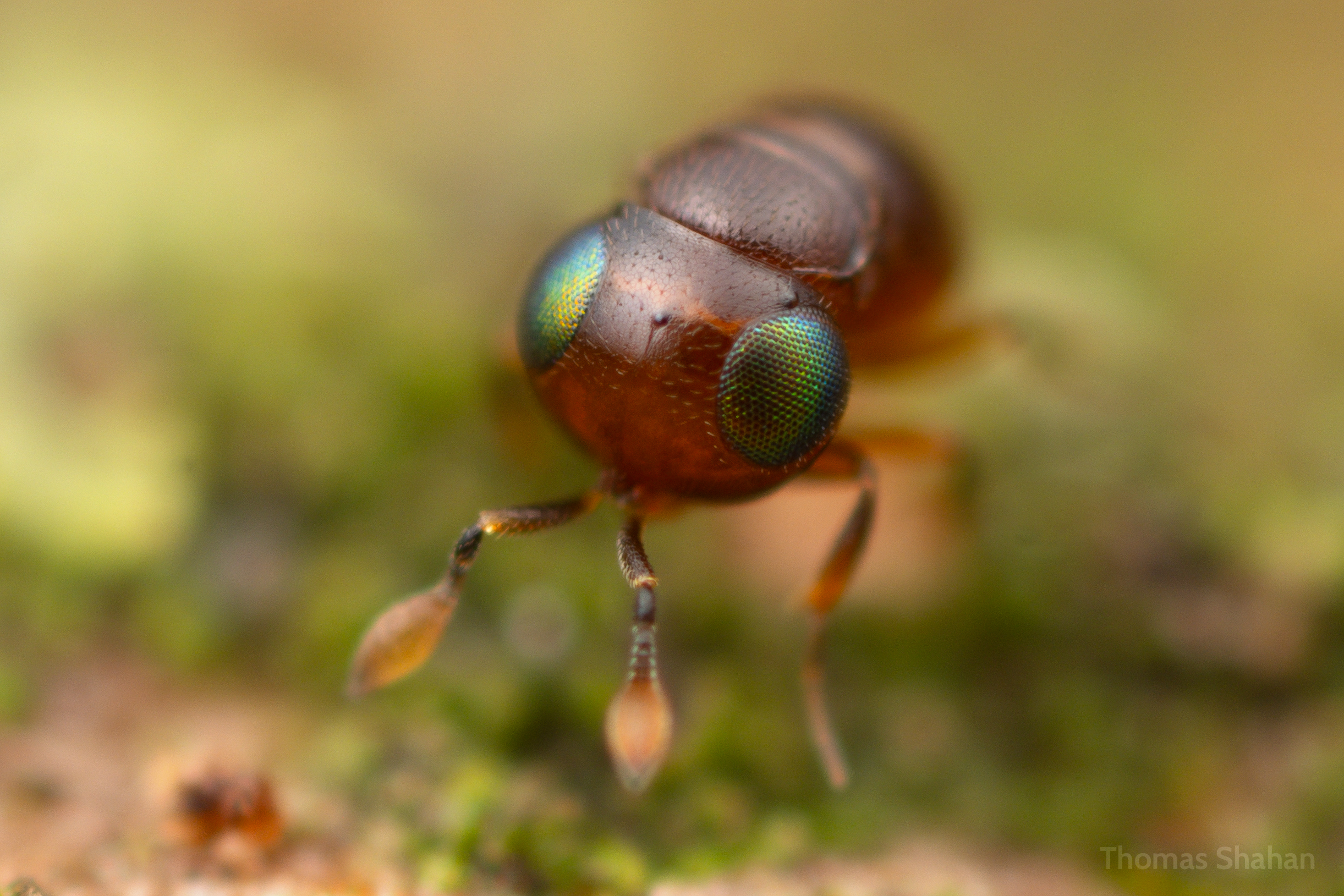
Baeus sp. from Oklahoma, USA.

Baeus is a genus of wasps in the family Scelionidae. They are parasitoids of spider eggs. They have a cosmopolitan distribution, being found on every continent but Antarctica. Baeus wasps are extremely sexually dimorphic; while females are very compact and have reduced or fused segments, males are winged and have a more typical appearance for wasps in Scelionidae.

== Species ==
These 95 species belong to the genus Baeus:

- Baeus acuminatus Veenakumari, 2020
- Baeus agniparvathus Veenakumari, 2020
- Baeus airavata Veenakumari, 2020
- Baeus americanus Howard, 1890
- Baeus anelosimus Margaría & Loiácono, 2006
- Baeus arachnevora (Risbec, 1956)
- Baeus arachnophagus Veenakumari, 2020
- Baeus archaearaneus Loiácono, 1973
- Baeus arthuri Stevens, 2007
- Baeus auraticeps Girault, 1915
- Baeus bagheera Veenakumari, 2020
- Baeus bharathiae Veenakumari, 2020
- Baeus californicus Pierce, 1939
- Baeus castaneus Kieffer, 1908
- Baeus chakora Veenakumari, 2020
- Baeus chitrasena Veenakumari, 2020
- Baeus ciprianii Veenakumari, 2020
- Baeus curvatus Kieffer, 1910
- Baeus cyclosae Margaría & Loiácono, 2006
- Baeus densipilosus Veenakumari, 2020
- Baeus dorianus Mineo, 2013
- Baeus dux Girault, 1933
- Baeus flaviscapus Veenakumari, 2020
- Baeus fluminensis Araujo & Vivallo
- Baeus gajakarna Veenakumari, 2020
- Baeus giganteus Veenakumari, 2020
- Baeus glenysae Stevens, 2007
- Baeus hallarakeri Stevens, 2007
- Baeus himalayanus Veenakumari, 2020
- Baeus iqbali Stevens, 2007
- Baeus itatiaiaensis Araujo & Vivallo
- Baeus jabaquara Margaría & Loiácono, 2006
- Baeus japonicus Kononova & Fursov, 1999
- Baeus jenningsi Stevens, 2007
- Baeus krishnareddyi Veenakumari, 2020
- Baeus krumbiegeli Veenakumari, 2020
- Baeus kubera Veenakumari, 2020
- Baeus kuscheli Ogloblin, 1957
- Baeus latrodecti Dozier, 1931
- Baeus leai Dodd, 1914
- Baeus leucophthalmus Araujo & Vivallo
- Baeus longiabdominalis Veenakumari, 2020
- Baeus machadoi (Risbec, 1957)
- Baeus mahanetra Veenakumari, 2020
- Baeus mareecha Veenakumari, 2020
- Baeus maruzzae Mineo, 2013
- Baeus maryae Stevens, 2007
- Baeus matthewi Stevens, 2007
- Baeus melanocephalus Araujo & Vivallo
- Baeus menaka Veenakumari, 2020
- Baeus metazygiae Loiácono & Margaría, 2004
- Baeus minoculo Mineo, 2013
- Baeus minutus Ashmead, 1893
- Baeus mirandus Kononova, 1999
- Baeus moorei Stevens, 2007
- Baeus morenus Araujo & Vivallo
- Baeus murphyi Stevens, 2007
- Baeus mymyae Stevens, 2007
- Baeus nbairus Veenakumari, 2020
- Baeus nicobarensis Veenakumari, 2020
- Baeus niger Ashmead, 1893
- Baeus nigrum Kononova & Fursov, 1999
- Baeus ocellatus Stevens, 2007
- Baeus persordidus Perkins, 1910
- Baeus piceus Ashmead, 1893
- Baeus platensis (Brèthes, 1913)
- Baeus poggianus Mineo, 2013
- Baeus prolatusspissus Stevens, 2007
- Baeus pygmaeus Veenakumari, 2020
- Baeus rachanae Veenakumari, 2020
- Baeus rambha Veenakumari, 2020
- Baeus ravana Veenakumari, 2020
- Baeus reticulatus Veenakumari, 2020
- Baeus rotundiventris Gahan, 1924
- Baeus rufus Kononova & Fursov, 1999
- Baeus saliens (Hickman, 1967)
- Baeus scrobiculus Stevens, 2007
- Baeus seminulum Haliday, 1833
- Baeus senus Kozlov & Lê, 1987
- Baeus spirolimbus Stevens, 2007
- Baeus sreedeviae Veenakumari, 2020
- Baeus striatus Veenakumari, 2020
- Baeus takshaka Veenakumari, 2020
- Baeus tejaswii Veenakumari, 2020
- Baeus tilottama Veenakumari, 2020
- Baeus tripurasundari Veenakumari, 2020
- Baeus tropaeumusbrevis Stevens, 2007
- Baeus tropaeumusdensus Stevens, 2007
- Baeus tumburu Veenakumari, 2020
- Baeus urvashi Veenakumari, 2020
- Baeus ventricosus Ogloblin, 1957
- Baeus vichitra Veenakumari, 2020
- Baeus vulcanus Stevens, 2007
- Baeus xanthoclavatus Veenakumari, 2020
- Baeus zabriskiei (Ashmead, 1893)
