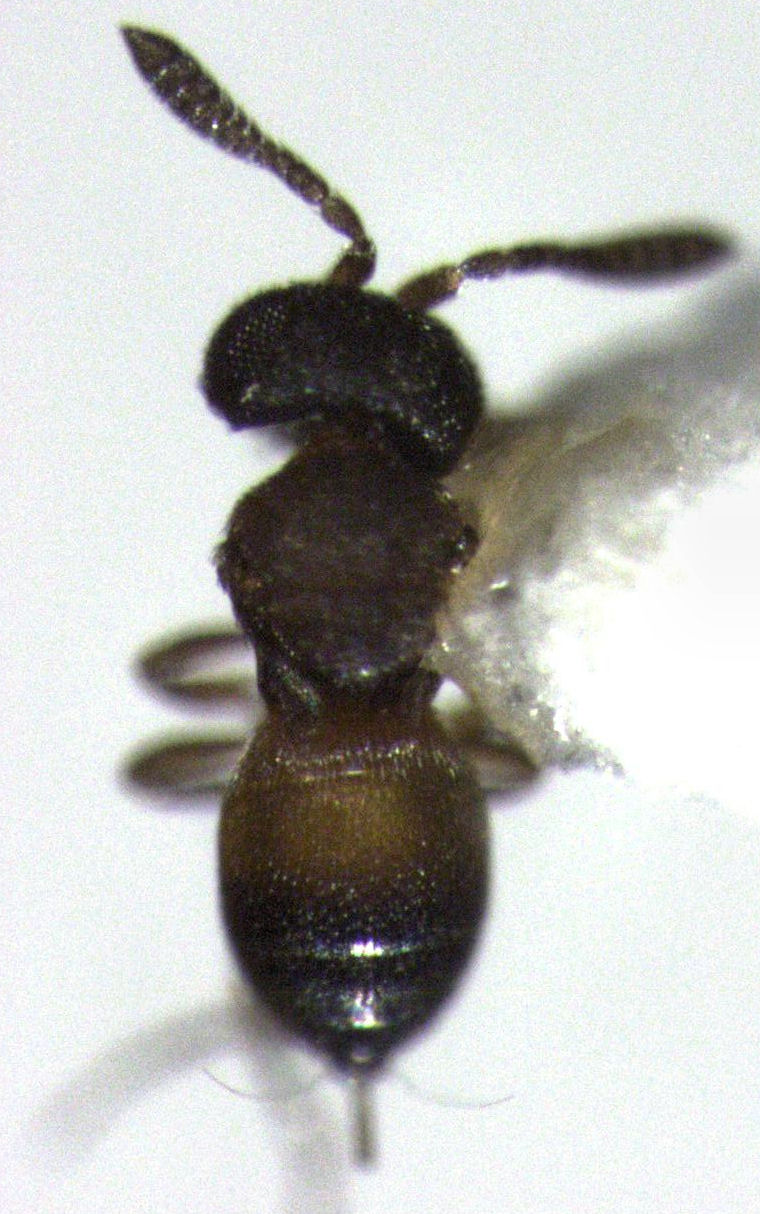
- Gryon sp.
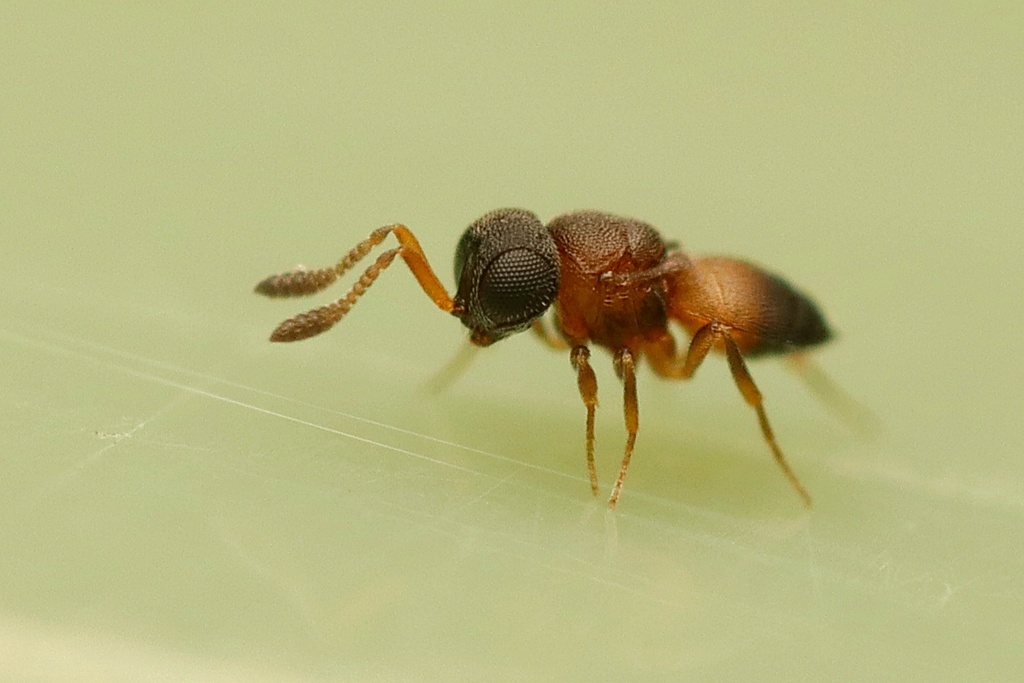
- Gryon misellum from New Zealand

Scientific classification
- Kingdom: Animalia
- Phylum: Arthropoda
- Clade: Pancrustacea
- Class: Insecta
- Order: Hymenoptera
- Family: Scelionidae
- Subfamily: Scelioninae
- Genus: Gryon; Haliday, 1833

Type species
- Gryon missellum Haliday, 1833

= Gryon (wasp) =

Genus of wasps

Gryon is a genus of parasitoid wasps in the family Scelionidae.

== Species ==
- Gryon austrafricanum Mineo, 1979
- Gryon basilwskyi (Risbec, 1957)
- Gryon basokoi (Risbec, 1958)
- Gryon bimaculatum Mineo, 1983
- Gryon bini Mineo, 1983
- Gryon charon (Nixon, 1934)
- Gryon coum (Nixon, 1934)
- Gryon eugeniae (Risbec, 1953)
- Gryon festivum (Kieffer, 1910)
- Gryon fulviventre (Crawford, 1912)
- Gryon giganteum Mineo, 1983
- Gryon hiberus (Nixon, 1934)
- Gryon ialokombae Mineo, 1983
- Gryon iammancoi Mineo, 1983
- Gryon janus (Nixon, 1934)
- Gryon kelnerpillauti Mineo, 1983
- Gryon kentyotum Mineo, 1982
- Gryon letus (Nixon, 1934)
- Gryon magnoculo Mineo, 1983
- Gryon mirperusi (Risbec, 1950)
- Gryon misellum Haliday, 1833
- Gryon morosum Mineo, 1983
- Gryon myndus (Nixon, 1934)
- Gryon naevium (Nixon, 1934)
- Gryon nitens (Szabó, 1963)
- Gryon oculatum Mineo, 1983
- Gryon odontogusi (Risbec, 1955)
- Gryon pappi Mineo, 1983
- Gryon paracharontis Mineo, 1982
- Gryon parasomaliense Mineo, 1983
- Gryon pisum Nixon, 1934
- Gryon rhinocori (Risbec, 1950)
- Gryon rugulosum (Fouts, 1934)
- Gryon sancti Mineo, 1983
- Gryon saxatile (Kieffer, 1910)
- Gryon scutidepressi Mineo, 1983
- Gryon sesbaniae (Risbec, 1956)
- Gryon somaliense Mineo, 1983
- Gryon urum Mineo, 1982
- Gryon watshami Mineo, 1983
- Gryon zimbabwense Mineo, 1983
