= Merriwa quadridentata =

Scientific classification
- Kingdom: Animalia
- Phylum: Arthropoda
- Class: Insecta
- Order: Hymenoptera
- Family: Platygastridae
- Genus: Merriwa; Dodd, 1920
- Species: M. quadridentata

Binomial name
- Merriwa quadridentata Dodd, 1920

Species of wasp

Merriwa is a monotypic genus of wasps belonging to the family Scelionidae. The only species is Merriwa quadridentata.

The species is found in Central Malesia.
