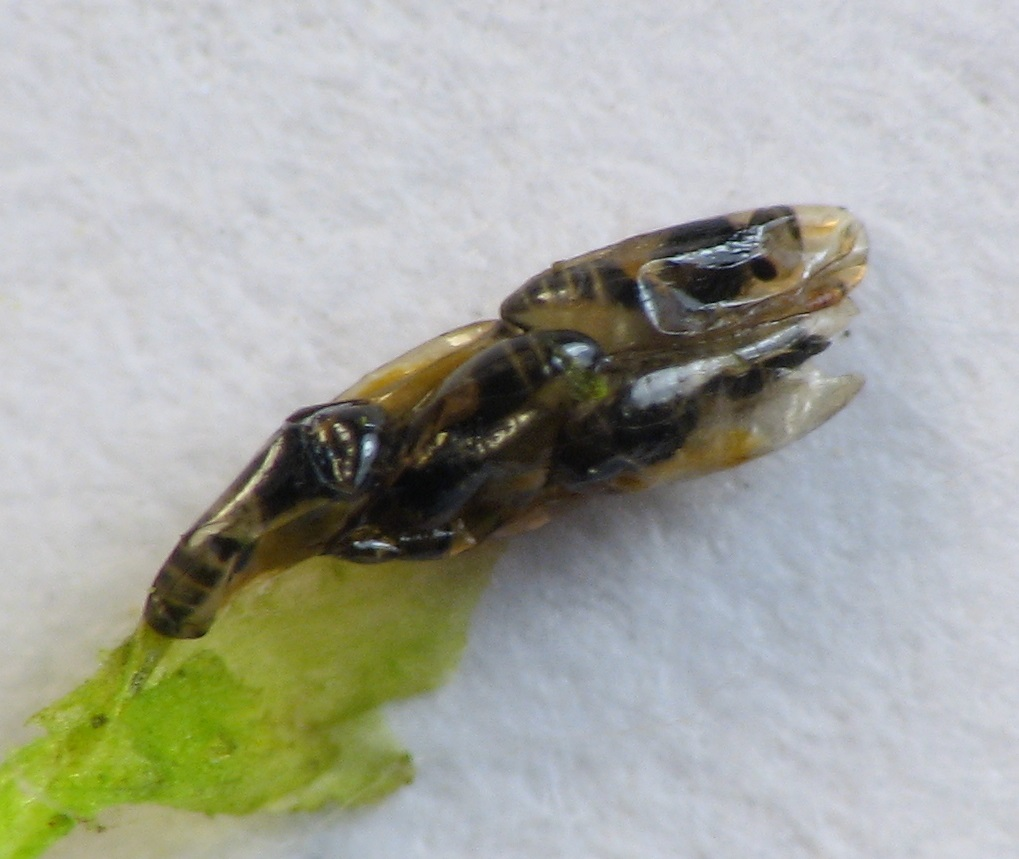
- Platygaster pupae inside gall

Scientific classification
- Kingdom: Animalia
- Phylum: Arthropoda
- Clade: Pancrustacea
- Class: Insecta
- Order: Hymenoptera
- Family: Platygastridae
- Subfamily: Platygastrinae; Haliday, 1833

Genera
- See text

= Platygastrinae =

Subfamily of wasps

Platygastrinae is a subfamily of parasitoid wasps in the family Platygastridae. They are parasitoids of gall midge eggs.

Platygaster sp. in copula

== Genera ==
Acerotella - Aceroteta - Allostemma - Allotropa - Almargella - Amblyaspis - Anectadius - Anirama - Annettella - Anopedias - Ceratacis - Criomica - Diplatygaster - Eritrissomerus - Euxestonotus - Gastrotrypes - Holocoeliella - Inostemma - Iphitrachelus - Isocybus - Isostasius - Leptacis - Magellanium - Metaclisis - Metanopedias - Moninostemma - Orseta - Piestopleura - Platygastemma - Platygaster - Platygasterites - Proleptacis - Proplatygaster - Prosactogaster - Prosinostemma - Prosynopeas - Pyrgaspis - Rao - Sacespalus - Stosta - Synopeas - Trichacis - Trichacoides - Tricholeptacis - Zelostemma
