= List of Synopeas species =

These species belong to Synopeas, a genus of parasitoid wasps in the family Platygastridae.

== Synopeas species ==
- Synopeas abaris (Walker, 1836)
- Synopeas abdominator (Fouts, 1925)
- Synopeas aciculatum (Fouts, 1924)
- Synopeas acuminatum Kieffer, 1916
- Synopeas acuticornis Buhl, 2003
- Synopeas acutispinus Buhl, 1998
- Synopeas acutiventris Buhl, 1997
- Synopeas affine (Nees von Esenbeck, 1834)
- Synopeas affinis (Nees, 1834)
- Synopeas africanus Buhl, 2004
- Synopeas alatus Buhl, 2004
- Synopeas amandae Awad, 2021
- Synopeas anderssoni Buhl, 2013
- Synopeas angustulum (Fouts, 1925)
- Synopeas anomaliventre (Ashmead, 1887)
- Synopeas anunu Awad, 2021
- Synopeas argentinensis Buhl, 2004
- Synopeas ashmeadii Dalla Torre, 1898
- Synopeas athenaeum (Walker, 1839)
- Synopeas atturense Mukerjee, 1981
- Synopeas auripes (Ashmead, 1893)
- Synopeas autumnalis Buhl, 1998
- Synopeas balabacensis Buhl, 1997
- Synopeas bengalense Mukerjee, 1978
- Synopeas bialowiezaensis Buhl, 2005
- Synopeas bicolor Sundholm, 1970
- Synopeas bifoveatum (Kieffer, 1912)
- Synopeas bifurcatus Buhl, 2001
- Synopeas blascoi Buhl, 1998
- Synopeas bohemani Buhl, 1998
- Synopeas bradleyi (Fouts, 1924)
- Synopeas breve Buhl, 1998
- Synopeas brevis Buhl, 1998
- Synopeas breviventre (Ashmead, 1893)
- Synopeas butterilli Buhl, 2013
- Synopeas calecai Buhl & Asadi, 2021
- Synopeas carinator (Fouts, 1925)
- Synopeas carinifrons Buhl, 2001
- Synopeas carpentieri Kieffer, 1916
- Synopeas chica Buhl, 2004
- Synopeas chinensis Buhl, 2007
- Synopeas ciliatum Thomson, 1859
- Synopeas codex Awad, 2021
- Synopeas collinus Choi & Buhl, 2006
- Synopeas compressiventris (Szabó, 1981)
- Synopeas congoanum (Risbec, 1958)
- Synopeas convexum Thomson, 1859
- Synopeas crassiceps Buhl, 1997
- Synopeas craterum (Walker, 1836)
- Synopeas cryptus Buhl, 2004
- Synopeas csoszi Buhl, 2004
- Synopeas curvicauda (Förster, 1856)
- Synopeas cynipsiphilum (Ashmead, 1887)
- Synopeas cynipsoides Buhl, 2004
- Synopeas daucicola Kieffer, 1916
- Synopeas decumbens Buhl, 1997
- Synopeas decurvatum (Nees von Esenbeck, 1834)
- Synopeas dentiscutellaris (Szabó, 1979)
- Synopeas dentiscutum (Szabó, 1981)
- Synopeas discoideus Buhl, 2005
- Synopeas doczkali Buhl, 2010
- Synopeas donizettii Vlug, 1995
- Synopeas dravedensis Buhl, 2004
- Synopeas dubiosum (Fouts, 1925)
- Synopeas epigeios Buhl, 2006
- Synopeas esenbecki Buhl, 1999
- Synopeas eugeniae Kieffer & Herbst, 1911
- Synopeas euryale (Walker, 1836)
- Synopeas figitiformis Thomson, 1859
- Synopeas flavicorne (Ashmead, 1893)
- Synopeas flavipes Ashmead, 1896
- Synopeas floridanum (Ashmead, 1893)
- Synopeas fluminale Yamagishi, 1980
- Synopeas fontali Buhl, 2002
- Synopeas forshagei Buhl, 2006
- Synopeas foutsi Masner, 1967
- Synopeas frontale Buhl, 2010
- Synopeas frontalis Buhl, 1998
- Synopeas fulvimanus Buhl, 2004
- Synopeas fungorum Buhl, 2000
- Synopeas fuscicola Box, 1921
- Synopeas fuscus Buhl, 1998
- Synopeas gallicola Kieffer, 1916
- Synopeas gastralis Buhl, 2001
- Synopeas gibberosus Buhl, 1997
- Synopeas globatum (Fouts, 1924)
- Synopeas goengeti Buhl, 1997
- Synopeas gracilicorne Kieffer, 1916
- Synopeas gracilicornis Kieffer, 1916
- Synopeas grenadense (Ashmead, 1896)
- Synopeas guatemalae Buhl, 2003
- Synopeas hakonense (Ashmead, 1904)
- Synopeas haladai Buhl, 2007
- Synopeas hansseni Buhl, 1998
- Synopeas hastatus Buhl, 2002
- Synopeas hopkinsi (Crawford & Bradley, 1911)
- Synopeas howardii (Ashmead, 1888)
- Synopeas hyllus (Walker, 1836)
- Synopeas ibadanensis Buhl, 2004
- Synopeas idarniforme (Dodd, 1916)
- Synopeas ilsei Vlug, 1995
- Synopeas incertum (Ashmead, 1887)
- Synopeas indicum Mani, 1975
- Synopeas indopeninsulare Mani, 1975
- Synopeas inerme Thomson, 1859
- Synopeas inermis Thomson, 1859
- Synopeas inquilinum Kieffer, 1904
- Synopeas insulare (Ashmead, 1894)
- Synopeas intermedius Buhl, 2003
- Synopeas involutum Kieffer, 1916
- Synopeas isus (Walker, 1839)
- Synopeas iteobia Kieffer, 1916
- Synopeas japonicum (Ashmead, 1904)
- Synopeas jasium (Walker, 1836)
- Synopeas johansoni Buhl, 2015
- Synopeas kalubia Awad, 2021
- Synopeas kanwonensis Buhl, 2006
- Synopeas kaszabi Buhl, 2004
- Synopeas kiki Awad, 2021
- Synopeas kimi Choi & Buhl, 2006
- Synopeas kira Awad, 2021
- Synopeas klingunculum Awad, 2021
- Synopeas koponeni Buhl, 2003
- Synopeas koreana Buhl, 2006
- Synopeas kovacsi Buhl, 2004
- Synopeas larides (Walker, 1836)
- Synopeas leda (Walker, 1839)
- Synopeas lemkaminensis Buhl, 1997
- Synopeas leroyi (Risbec, 1958)
- Synopeas leve Fouts, 1935
- Synopeas levis Fouts, 1934
- Synopeas longifuniculus Buhl, 2002
- Synopeas longiventre (Ashmead, 1893)
- Synopeas lugubre Thomson, 1859
- Synopeas lugubris Thomson, 1859
- Synopeas luli Awad, 2021
- Synopeas luteolipes Buhl, 1997
- Synopeas luzonicum (Ashmead, 1905)
- Synopeas macrurus (Ashmead, 1896)
- Synopeas maculipes (Ashmead, 1887)
- Synopeas madagascariense (Risbec, 1953)
- Synopeas madridiana Buhl, 2001
- Synopeas magnussoni Buhl, 2010
- Synopeas mahunkai Buhl, 2006
- Synopeas mangiferae Austin, 1984
- Synopeas marttii Buhl, 2004
- Synopeas maximum Awad & Talamas, 2023
- Synopeas mazumbaiense Buhl & MS, 2008
- Synopeas melampus Förster, 1861
- Synopeas meridionalis Brues, 1922
- Synopeas millefolii (Kieffer, 1913)
- Synopeas minor (Brues, 1922)
- Synopeas mongolicus Buhl, 2004
- Synopeas montanus Buhl, 1997
- Synopeas monticola (Kieffer, 1910)
- Synopeas mucronatum (Ratzeburg, 1852)
- Synopeas mukerjeei Buhl, 1997
- Synopeas muticum (Nees von Esenbeck, 1834)
- Synopeas myles (Walker, 1836)
- Synopeas neglectus Buhl, 2004
- Synopeas nepalense Mukerjee, 1981
- Synopeas nervicola Kieffer, 1916
- Synopeas nervorum Kieffer, 1916
- Synopeas neurolasiopterae Brèthes, 1922
- Synopeas neuroteri Kieffer, 1916
- Synopeas nievesaldreyi Buhl, 2002
- Synopeas nigeriana Buhl, 2004
- Synopeas nigerrimum Sundholm, 1970
- Synopeas nigripes Ashmead, 1893
- Synopeas nigriscapis Förster, 1861
- Synopeas nigroides Buhl, 2001
- Synopeas nottoni Buhl, 2009
- Synopeas noyesi Buhl, 2009
- Synopeas obesus Buhl, 2001
- Synopeas occultum Awad, 2021
- Synopeas opacum Thomson, 1859
- Synopeas osaces (Walker, 1836)
- Synopeas osgoodi MacGown, 1974
- Synopeas otiosum Kieffer, 1924
- Synopeas palawanensis Buhl, 1997
- Synopeas pallescens Buhl, 1997
- Synopeas pallidicornis Buhl, 2006
- Synopeas panamaensis Buhl, 2002
- Synopeas paolii Fouts, 1934
- Synopeas pattiae Awad, 2021
- Synopeas pauliani (Risbec, 1957)
- Synopeas pennsylvanicum (Fouts, 1924)
- Synopeas pinnei Buhl, 2009
- Synopeas pisi (Förster, 1856)
- Synopeas planiscutellum Buhl, 1997
- Synopeas pleuralis Buhl, 2004
- Synopeas polaszeki Buhl, 2004
- Synopeas procerus Buhl, 2005
- Synopeas procon Austin, 1984
- Synopeas prospectum Förster, 1861
- Synopeas psychotriae Buhl, 2013
- Synopeas pterocarpi Buhl, 2013
- Synopeas pubescens (Ashmead, 1893)
- Synopeas pulupulu Awad, 2021
- Synopeas pumilus Buhl & Choi, 2006
- Synopeas punctatum (Ashmead, 1893)
- Synopeas punctigaster (Szabó, 1981)
- Synopeas queenslandicus Buhl, 2004
- Synopeas raphanistri Kieffer, 1916
- Synopeas rectum (Ratzeburg, 1852)
- Synopeas recurvatus Buhl, 2003
- Synopeas reticulatifrons Buhl, 2002
- Synopeas reticulatum (Szabó, 1966)
- Synopeas rhane (Walker, 1836)
- Synopeas rhanis (Walker, 1836)
- Synopeas rigidicornis Förster, 1861
- Synopeas rionegroensis Buhl, 2004
- Synopeas robustus Buhl, 2004
- Synopeas romsoeense Buhl, 1999
- Synopeas romsoeensis Buhl, 1999
- Synopeas roncavei Awad, 2021
- Synopeas ronquisti Buhl, 2010
- Synopeas royi Buhl, 2001
- Synopeas ruficoxa Buhl, 2006
- Synopeas rufipes (Ashmead, 1894)
- Synopeas rufiscapus Ashmead, 1893
- Synopeas rugiceps Ashmead
- Synopeas rugosiceps (Kieffer, 1926)
- Synopeas russelli MacGown, 2003
- Synopeas saccharale (Dodd, 1916)
- Synopeas saintexuperyi Buhl, 1997
- Synopeas salice Szelényi, 1940
- Synopeas salicicola (Kieffer, 1916)
- Synopeas salicis Szelenyi, 1940
- Synopeas sanga Awad, 2021
- Synopeas saopaulensis Buhl, 2004
- Synopeas sculpturatum Buhl, 1997
- Synopeas seychellense (Kieffer, 1912)
- Synopeas soederlundi Buhl, 2005
- Synopeas solidus Buhl, 2001
- Synopeas solomonensis Buhl, 1997
- Synopeas sose (Walker, 1836)
- Synopeas sosis (Walker, 1836)
- Synopeas spinifer Kozlov, 1978
- Synopeas spiniferum Kozlov, 1978
- Synopeas spinulus Buhl, 2004
- Synopeas srilankensis Buhl, 2003
- Synopeas stigenbergae Buhl, 2013
- Synopeas striatifrons (Ashmead, 1893)
- Synopeas striatitergitis Buhl, 2004
- Synopeas striatum (Risbec, 1958)
- Synopeas subaequale (Förster, 1856)
- Synopeas subaequalis (Foerster, 1856)
- Synopeas substrigosus Buhl, 2006
- Synopeas subtilis Buhl, 2004
- Synopeas sundholmi Buhl, 2005
- Synopeas suomiana Buhl, 2003
- Synopeas talhouki Vlug, 1976
- Synopeas tarsa (Walker, 1836)
- Synopeas temporale Austin, 1984
- Synopeas texanum (Fouts, 1925)
- Synopeas thersippus (Walker, 1839)
- Synopeas thorkildi Buhl, 2004
- Synopeas thysanus Kozlov, 1978
- Synopeas tosticola Kozlov
- Synopeas toto Awad, 2021
- Synopeas trebium (Walker, 1836)
- Synopeas tripartitum (Kieffer, 1917)
- Synopeas tropicus Buhl, 1997
- Synopeas tuberosum Sundholm, 1970
- Synopeas valavala Awad, 2021
- Synopeas varipes (Harrington, 1900)
- Synopeas velutinum (Walker, 1836)
- Synopeas ventrale (Westwood, 1833)
- Synopeas ventricosus Buhl, 1997
- Synopeas vulgaris Buhl, 2004
- Synopeas wangsjoi Buhl, 2009
- Synopeas wasmanni Kieffer, 1916
- Synopeas weaveri Buhl, 2001
- Synopeas xanthopus Kieffer, 1913
- Synopeas xenarchus (Walker, 1839)
- Synopeas yanagi Yamagishi, 1980
- Synopeas zaitama Yoshida & Hirashima, 1979
- Synopeas zhangi Awad, 2021
- Synopeas zomborii Buhl, 2004
