= List of Platygaster species =

These 561 species belong to the genus Platygaster, platygastrids.

== Platygaster species ==
- Platygaster aberrans Buhl, 1998
- Platygaster abia Walker, 1836
- Platygaster abicollis MacGown & Osgood, 1971
- Platygaster abisares Walker, 1836
- Platygaster aboriginalis Buhl, 2004
- Platygaster abrupta Buhl, 1994
- Platygaster acciculosis Drake, 1970
- Platygaster aciculata Ashmead, 1893
- Platygaster acrisius Walker, 1836
- Platygaster actinomeridis (Ashmead, 1893)
- Platygaster acuticlava Buhl, 1998
- Platygaster acutocularis Buhl, 1998
- Platygaster aebeloeensis Buhl, 2001
- Platygaster aegeus Walker, 1836
- Platygaster affinis Fouts, 1925
- Platygaster alnicola (Ashmead, 1893)
- Platygaster alticola Kieffer, 1910
- Platygaster ambositrensis Risbec, 1955
- Platygaster americana (Ashmead, 1887)
- Platygaster aneurus (Provancher, 1887)
- Platygaster angulata (Ashmead, 1893)
- Platygaster angustula (Thomson, 1859)
- Platygaster anopediana Buhl, 2005
- Platygaster anormis (Brues, 1910)
- Platygaster antennariae (Ashmead, 1893)
- Platygaster anura Fouts, 1925
- Platygaster aphidis Ashmead, 1893
- Platygaster apicalis Thomson, 1859
- Platygaster applanata Buhl, 2001
- Platygaster appropinquata Buhl, 2006
- Platygaster aptera Nees, 1834
- Platygaster armata Buhl, 2017
- Platygaster artemisiae (Ashmead, 1893)
- Platygaster ashmeadiana Huggert, 1973
- Platygaster asiatica Buhl, 2004
- Platygaster astericola (Ashmead, 1893)
- Platygaster asynaptae (Ashmead, 1893)
- Platygaster ater Buhl, 2011
- Platygaster athamas Walker, 1836
- Platygaster atrae Fouts, 1924
- Platygaster atriplicis (Ashmead, 1893)
- Platygaster attenuata Walker, 1836
- Platygaster australis (Dodd, 1916)
- Platygaster automenes Walker, 1839
- Platygaster baccharicola (Ashmead, 1887)
- Platygaster baccharidis Kieffer & Jörgensen, 1910
- Platygaster baezi Buhl, 2003
- Platygaster baloghi Buhl, 2004
- Platygaster basi Vlug, 1995
- Platygaster beneficiens MacGown, 1979
- Platygaster betulae (Kieffer, 1916)
- Platygaster betularia Kieffer, 1916
- Platygaster biroi Buhl, 2004
- Platygaster blascozumetae Buhl, 1998
- Platygaster bonessi Buhl, 2000
- Platygaster boneti Buhl, 2006
- Platygaster borealis Buhl, 1998
- Platygaster brachyptera Buhl, 2004
- Platygaster brevicornis Förster, 1861
- Platygaster brevipetiolata Buhl, 2004
- Platygaster brevistriata Kieffer, 1916
- Platygaster bucolion Walker, 1836
- Platygaster bureschi Szabó, 1959
- Platygaster burkei (Rohwer, 1917)
- Platygaster californica (Ashmead, 1893)
- Platygaster canestrinii (Rondani, 1866)
- Platygaster caninifrons (Brues, 1910)
- Platygaster caryae Ashmead, 1893
- Platygaster caulicola Kieffer & Jörgensen, 1910
- Platygaster cebes Walker, 1836
- Platygaster cecconii Kieffer, 1913
- Platygaster cecidomyiae Ratzeburg, 1852
- Platygaster cenone Fouts
- Platygaster chaos
- Platygaster chilensis (Brèthes, 1915)
- Platygaster chloropus Thomson, 1859
- Platygaster chrysippus Walker, 1836
- Platygaster ciliata Buhl & Choi, 2006
- Platygaster clavata Buhl, 1994
- Platygaster cochleata Walker, 1836
- Platygaster coloradensis (Ashmead, 1893)
- Platygaster columbiana Fouts, 1924
- Platygaster compressa Fouts, 1934
- Platygaster compressicornis (Thomson, 1859)
- Platygaster compressiventris (Ashmead, 1893)
- Platygaster confinis Thomson, 1859
- Platygaster consobrina Kieffer, 1913
- Platygaster contorticornis Ratzeburg, 1844
- Platygaster convergens Kieffer, 1913
- Platygaster coorgensis (Mukerjee, 1978)
- Platygaster corcyrana Buhl, 1996
- Platygaster corni Kieffer, 1916
- Platygaster coronata (Brues, 1910)
- Platygaster corvina Förster, 1861
- Platygaster costaricae Buhl, 2003
- Platygaster cottei Kieffer, 1913
- Platygaster crassa (Kryger & Schmiedeknecht, 1938)
- Platygaster crassicornis Buhl, 1998
- Platygaster crenulata Buhl, 2004
- Platygaster cruciferarum Kieffer, 1916
- Platygaster csoszi Buhl, 2004
- Platygaster cuspidata Buhl, 2005
- Platygaster cynipicola (Ashmead, 1893)
- Platygaster cyrsilus Walker, 1836
- Platygaster dalgaardi Buhl, 2006
- Platygaster damokles Buhl, 1998
- Platygaster danica Buhl, 1999
- Platygaster danielssoni Buhl, 1998
- Platygaster danyiensis Buhl, 2014
- Platygaster davei Buhl, 2010
- Platygaster deipyla Walker, 1836
- Platygaster delyi Buhl, 2006
- Platygaster demades Walker, 1836
- Platygaster dentata Buhl, 2001
- Platygaster denticulata Buhl, 2001
- Platygaster depressiventris Thomson, 1859
- Platygaster dictys Walker, 1836
- Platygaster dilata Buhl, 2001
- Platygaster diplosidis (Ashmead, 1893)
- Platygaster diplosisae Risbec, 1956
- Platygaster disincta Fouts
- Platygaster distincta Fouts, 1926
- Platygaster dombeyae Risbec, 1953
- Platygaster draskovitsi Buhl, 2006
- Platygaster dryomiae Dieuzeide, 1927
- Platygaster dryope Walker, 1836
- Platygaster dubia (Ashmead, 1894)
- Platygaster elissa Walker, 1839
- Platygaster elongata Haliday, 1833
- Platygaster ennius Walker, 1836
- Platygaster ensifer (Westwood, 1833)
- Platygaster entwistlei Buhl, 1997
- Platygaster equestris Spittler, 1969
- Platygaster ericeti Rondani, 1877
- Platygaster eriphyle Walker, 1836
- Platygaster errans Fouts, 1924
- Platygaster eryngii Kieffer, 1916
- Platygaster estonica Buhl, 2004
- Platygaster ethiopica Buhl, 2004
- Platygaster etsuhoae Buhl, 1998
- Platygaster eucalyptodiplosisae Buhl, 2017
- Platygaster euhemerus Walker, 1836
- Platygaster eurotiae (Ashmead, 1893)
- Platygaster euurae (Ashmead, 1893)
- Platygaster euxestonotoides Buhl, 1998
- Platygaster exiguae Fouts, 1926
- Platygaster felti Fouts, 1920
- Platygaster fennica Buhl, 2003
- Platygaster filicaudis Fouts, 1925
- Platygaster filicornis Walker, 1836
- Platygaster flabellata Buhl, 2003
- Platygaster flagellata Buhl, 2003
- Platygaster flavifemorata Buhl & Choi, 2006
- Platygaster flavitarsis Fouts, 1926
- Platygaster floridensis Ashmead, 1887
- Platygaster foersteri (Gahan, 1919)
- Platygaster formicarum Kieffer, 1916
- Platygaster forshagei Buhl, 2006
- Platygaster foutsi Huggert, 1973
- Platygaster frater Buhl, 2006
- Platygaster fumipennis Fouts, 1924
- Platygaster funesta Motschulsky, 1852
- Platygaster fungicola Kieffer, 1916
- Platygaster fusca Buhl, 2004
- Platygaster fuscalis Buhl, 2011
- Platygaster fuscipennis Fouts, 1924
- Platygaster gahani Fouts, 1924
- Platygaster gaia Buhl, 2004
- Platygaster galbus Ushakumari, 2004
- Platygaster galenus Walker, 1836
- Platygaster gambiana Buhl, 2006
- Platygaster genata Buhl, 1998
- Platygaster generalii Rondani, 1866
- Platygaster germanica Buhl, 1998
- Platygaster gifuensis (Ashmead, 1904)
- Platygaster glemhornae Buhl, 2010
- Platygaster globicola Kieffer & Jörgensen, 1910
- Platygaster gorge Walker, 1836
- Platygaster gorgo Walker, 1839
- Platygaster gracilicornis (Ashmead, 1894)
- Platygaster gracilipes Huggert, 1975
- Platygaster gracilis Ashmead
- Platygaster gyge Walker, 1836
- Platygaster gyrone Szelényi, 1958
- Platygaster hanseni Buhl, 2006
- Platygaster hanssoniana Buhl, 2003
- Platygaster harpagoceras
- Platygaster henkvlugi Buhl, 1996
- Platygaster hera Buhl, 1998
- Platygaster herricki Packard, 1880
- Platygaster heterothalami Kieffer & Jörgensen, 1910
- Platygaster hiemalis Forbes, 1888
- Platygaster hoffmeyeri Buhl, 2006
- Platygaster hovmoelleri Buhl, 2006
- Platygaster huachucae (Ashmead, 1893)
- Platygaster huggerti Buhl, 2001
- Platygaster hyalinata (Thomson, 1859)
- Platygaster hyalinipennis (Ashmead, 1887)
- Platygaster hybrida Buhl, 1994
- Platygaster hyemalis Curtis, 1830
- Platygaster hygrophila Kieffer, 1916
- Platygaster iberica Buhl, 1998
- Platygaster ilona Szabó, 1976
- Platygaster imlaci Buhl, 1997
- Platygaster inconspicua Buhl, 1999
- Platygaster indefinita Buhl, 2006
- Platygaster inderdaadi Vlug, 1995
- Platygaster indica Mukerjee, 1978
- Platygaster inermis Walker, 1836
- Platygaster ingeniosus Matsuo & Yamagishi, 2018
- Platygaster insularis (Ashmead, 1894)
- Platygaster intermedia Buhl, 2006
- Platygaster intermedius Ushakumari, 2004
- Platygaster iolas Walker, 1836
- Platygaster iteocrypta Kieffer, 1916
- Platygaster iteophila (Kieffer, 1916)
- Platygaster javieri Buhl, 1998
- Platygaster juniperella MacGown, 1979
- Platygaster juniperi MacGown, 1979
- Platygaster juniperina MacGown, 1979
- Platygaster jutlandica Buhl, 2006
- Platygaster kalmiae Fouts, 1925
- Platygaster karlssoni Buhl, 2010
- Platygaster kaszabi Buhl, 2004
- Platygaster kenyana Buhl, 2004
- Platygaster keralicus Ushakumari, 2004
- Platygaster kimballi MacGown, 1974
- Platygaster komugi Ishii, 1953
- Platygaster koponeni Buhl, 2003
- Platygaster koreana Buhl, 2006
- Platygaster krarupi Buhl, 1995
- Platygaster kui Choi & Buhl, 2006
- Platygaster laevicollis (Ashmead, 1893)
- Platygaster laevifrons Buhl, 2002
- Platygaster laeviventris Thomson, 1859
- Platygaster lamelliformis Huggert, 1973
- Platygaster lampronota Fouts, 1924
- Platygaster lanceolata Buhl, 1996
- Platygaster lapponica Thomson, 1859
- Platygaster laricis Haliday, 1836
- Platygaster lasiopterae Kieffer & Jörgensen, 1910
- Platygaster lasiorum Kieffer, 1916
- Platygaster lata Förster, 1861
- Platygaster latescens (Brues, 1910)
- Platygaster laticeps Thomson, 1859
- Platygaster laticlavus (Ashmead, 1894)
- Platygaster laticornis Buhl, 2004
- Platygaster latifrons Huggert, 1973
- Platygaster latiptera Buhl, 2010
- Platygaster leguminicolae Fouts, 1920
- Platygaster leileri Buhl, 2007
- Platygaster leptines Walker, 1836
- Platygaster leptoptera Buhl, 1998
- Platygaster leptosoma Buhl, 2006
- Platygaster leucanthemi (Kieffer, 1916)
- Platygaster libocedri MacGown, 1974
- Platygaster liga Buhl, 2014
- Platygaster linearis Fouts, 1924
- Platygaster lineaticeps Buhl, 1994
- Platygaster litoralis Buhl, 1998
- Platygaster lobata Buhl, 2014
- Platygaster longestriata Kieffer, 1916
- Platygaster longestriolata Thomson, 1859
- Platygaster longicaudata Kieffer, 1906
- Platygaster lubomasneri Buhl, 1995
- Platygaster lucida Fouts, 1924
- Platygaster luctuosa Kieffer & Herbst, 1911
- Platygaster lugens Kieffer, 1926
- Platygaster lundensis Buhl, 1997
- Platygaster lupinicola (Ashmead, 1893)
- Platygaster luteocoxalis (Kozlov, 1966)
- Platygaster lyciicola Kieffer & Jörgensen, 1910
- Platygaster lyneborgi Buhl, 1998
- Platygaster lysicles Walker, 1836
- Platygaster maarteni Vlug, 1995
- Platygaster macgowni Buhl, 2001
- Platygaster macroptera Buhl, 2004
- Platygaster mahensis Kieffer, 1912
- Platygaster mainensis MacGown & Osgood, 1971
- Platygaster malabarica (Mukerjee, 1978)
- Platygaster malaisei Buhl, 2005
- Platygaster malpighii Kieffer, 1916
- Platygaster mandrakae Risbec, 1955
- Platygaster manto Walker, 1836
- Platygaster marchali Kieffer, 1906
- Platygaster marginata Thomson, 1859
- Platygaster martikaineni Buhl, 2003
- Platygaster marttii Buhl, 2003
- Platygaster marylandica Fouts, 1924
- Platygaster masneri Huggert, 1975
- Platygaster matsutama Yoshida & Hirashima, 1979
- Platygaster matuschanskavaskyi Buhl, 2003
- Platygaster mayetiolae Kieffer, 1916
- Platygaster mayi Buhl, 2017
- Platygaster mediocris (Brues, 1910)
- Platygaster meduxnekeagensis Buhl, 2006
- Platygaster melanocera (Ashmead, 1887)
- Platygaster melliscapus (Ashmead, 1893)
- Platygaster meridionalis (Ashmead, 1894)
- Platygaster micromma Buhl, 2010
- Platygaster microsculpturata Buhl, 1999
- Platygaster minima (Mukerjee, 1978)
- Platygaster minthe Walker, 1836
- Platygaster minuta Zetterstedt, 1840
- Platygaster minutissima Fouts, 1925
- Platygaster minutula Dalla Torre, 1898
- Platygaster mirabilis (Ashmead, 1893)
- Platygaster misella Buhl, 2006
- Platygaster moczari Szabó, 1976
- Platygaster modesta Buhl, 1998
- Platygaster molsensis Buhl, 1995
- Platygaster mongolica Buhl, 2004
- Platygaster mumfordi Fouts, 1934
- Platygaster munita Walker, 1836
- Platygaster munki Buhl, 1994
- Platygaster muscivora Risbec, 1950
- Platygaster myrmecobia Kieffer, 1913
- Platygaster narendrani Ushakumari, 2004
- Platygaster nashi Buhl & O'Connor, 2011
- Platygaster natalensis Buhl, 2003
- Platygaster nigeriana Buhl, 2004
- Platygaster nigerrimus (Kieffer, 1926)
- Platygaster nigra Nees von Esenbeck, 1834
- Platygaster nigricoxa Fouts, 1925
- Platygaster nigrifemur (Ashmead, 1890)
- Platygaster nigripes Ratzeburg, 1852
- Platygaster nigrita Buhl, 2004
- Platygaster nigrocoxatus Ushakumari, 2004
- Platygaster nisus Walker, 1836
- Platygaster nodicola (Kieffer, 1916)
- Platygaster noonae Buhl, 1995
- Platygaster norvegica Kieffer, 1913
- Platygaster nottoni Buhl, 1995
- Platygaster novaezealandiae Buhl, 2011
- Platygaster noveboracensis (Brues, 1910)
- Platygaster oblonga Buhl, 2005
- Platygaster obscura Nees von Esenbeck, 1834
- Platygaster obscuripennis Ashmead, 1893
- Platygaster oculata Buhl, 2004
- Platygaster oebalus Walker, 1836
- Platygaster oeclus Walker, 1836
- Platygaster oenone Fouts, 1925
- Platygaster oleae Szelényi, 1940
- Platygaster opaca Ruthe, 1859
- Platygaster orcus Walker, 1836
- Platygaster ornata Kieffer, 1906
- Platygaster orus Walker, 1836
- Platygaster oryzae Cameron, 1891
- Platygaster oscus Walker, 1836
- Platygaster otandjoboliensis Buhl, 2014
- Platygaster otanes Walker, 1836
- Platygaster oviventris Buhl, 2004
- Platygaster paches Walker, 1842
- Platygaster pallida Fouts, 1925
- Platygaster pallidicoxalis (Ashmead, 1894)
- Platygaster pallipes (Ashmead, 1890)
- Platygaster panamaensis Buhl, 2002
- Platygaster panchganii Mani, 1975
- Platygaster pappi Buhl, 2004
- Platygaster parallela Walker, 1835
- Platygaster parvula Zetterstedt, 1840
- Platygaster pauliani Risbec, 1953
- Platygaster pedasus Walker, 1836
- Platygaster pedestris Buhl, 2004
- Platygaster pelias Walker, 1836
- Platygaster pentatoma (Ashmead, 1893)
- Platygaster perineti Risbec, 1953
- Platygaster perplexa Fouts, 1925
- Platygaster persicariae Kieffer, 1906
- Platygaster philinna Walker, 1836
- Platygaster philippiae Risbec, 1953
- Platygaster phragmitiphila Buhl, 2006
- Platygaster phragmitis (Schrank, 1781)
- Platygaster picipes Förster, 1861
- Platygaster pilco Sundholm, 1970
- Platygaster pinaensis Buhl, 1998
- Platygaster pini Fouts
- Platygaster pinicola (Ashmead, 1893)
- Platygaster piniphila MacGown, 1979
- Platygaster pinyonicola MacGown, 1979
- Platygaster piso Sundholm, 1970
- Platygaster plana Buhl, 1994
- Platygaster planivertex Buhl, 2014
- Platygaster planoides Buhl, 1995
- Platygaster platyptera Buhl, 2005
- Platygaster pleuron Walker, 1836
- Platygaster plotina Walker, 1836
- Platygaster pluto (Ashmead, 1887)
- Platygaster podocarpi Buhl, 2015
- Platygaster polaszeki Buhl, 2004
- Platygaster polita Thomson, 1859
- Platygaster politiceps Buhl, 2013
- Platygaster ponderosae MacGown, 1979
- Platygaster praecox Buhl, 1999
- Platygaster producta MacGown, 1979
- Platygaster prolata MacGown, 1971
- Platygaster propucta Macgown
- Platygaster proxima (Ashmead, 1893)
- Platygaster pruni
- Platygaster pseudotsugae MacGown, 1979
- Platygaster pubiventris Buhl, 2005
- Platygaster puccinii Vlug, 1995
- Platygaster punctiventris Buhl, 2006
- Platygaster pygmaea Kieffer, 1913
- Platygaster pyramidalis Nees von Esenbeck, 1834
- Platygaster quadriceps Buhl, 2006
- Platygaster quadrifarius (Kieffer, 1916)
- Platygaster ramachandrai (Rao, 1950)
- Platygaster relativa Fouts, 1924
- Platygaster resinosae MacGown, 1979
- Platygaster retuertae Buhl, 1998
- Platygaster reyi Buhl, 2001
- Platygaster rhabdophagae MacGown, 1979
- Platygaster riparia Yamagishi, 1980
- Platygaster robertensis Buhl, 2017
- Platygaster robiniae Buhl & Duso, 2008
- Platygaster rohweri Fouts, 1924
- Platygaster romanica Popovici & Buhl, 2005
- Platygaster rossinii Vlug, 1995
- Platygaster rubi (Ashmead, 1893)
- Platygaster ruficornis (Latreille, 1805)
- Platygaster rufidens Fouts, 1925
- Platygaster rufitibia Buhl, 1999
- Platygaster rugosiceps Buhl, 1994
- Platygaster rutilipes Buhl, 1997
- Platygaster rutubus Walker, 1836
- Platygaster rwankwiensis Risbec, 1958
- Platygaster sagana Walker, 1836
- Platygaster salicicola (Ashmead, 1893)
- Platygaster saliciperdae Kieffer, 1913
- Platygaster salvadorae Rao, 1950
- Platygaster sambuci (Kieffer, 1916)
- Platygaster sasii Ushakumari, 2004
- Platygaster satara Mani, 1975
- Platygaster scorpoides Muesebeck & Walkley, 1951
- Platygaster scotica Kieffer, 1913
- Platygaster scrophulariae (Kieffer, 1916)
- Platygaster sculptiventris Buhl, 2007
- Platygaster scutellator Fouts, 1925
- Platygaster semiflava Buhl, 2006
- Platygaster semiglabra (Girault, 1920)
- Platygaster setosa Buhl, 2003
- Platygaster shastensis Fouts, 1924
- Platygaster signata (Förster, 1861)
- Platygaster signe Buhl, 2006
- Platygaster similis MacGown, 1974
- Platygaster simplex (Brues, 1922)
- Platygaster singularis Buhl, 2006
- Platygaster sinica Buhl, 1996
- Platygaster sociabilis Kieffer & Jörgensen, 1910
- Platygaster soederlundi Buhl, 1998
- Platygaster solidaginis (Ashmead, 1887)
- Platygaster solodovnikovi Buhl, 2011
- Platygaster sonchis Walker, 1836
- Platygaster sophianae Szabó, 1976
- Platygaster specularis Buhl, 1998
- Platygaster spiniger Nees, 1834
- Platygaster spinigera Nees von Esenbeck, 1834
- Platygaster splendens Sundholm, 1970
- Platygaster splendidula Ruthe, 1859
- Platygaster srilankensis Buhl, 2003
- Platygaster stachydis (Kieffer, 1916)
- Platygaster stefaniellae Buhl, 2000
- Platygaster stefaniolae Buhl, 1998
- Platygaster sterope Walker, 1836
- Platygaster stimulator Yamagishi, 1980
- Platygaster strato Walker, 1836
- Platygaster striaticeps (Ashmead, 1893)
- Platygaster striaticollis (Ashmead, 1893)
- Platygaster striatidorsum Buhl, 1998
- Platygaster striatifacies Buhl, 1996
- Platygaster striatifrons Fouts, 1925
- Platygaster striatipleura Buhl, 2004
- Platygaster striatitergitis Buhl, 1995
- Platygaster striatithorax Buhl, 1994
- Platygaster striolata Nees von Esenbeck, 1834
- Platygaster stylata Huggert, 1980
- Platygaster subanguliceps Buhl, 2014
- Platygaster subapicalis Buhl, 2006
- Platygaster subfilicornis Buhl, 2006
- Platygaster subparallela Buhl, 2017
- Platygaster subplana Buhl, 2005
- Platygaster subterranea (Kieffer, 1916)
- Platygaster subtilis Förster, 1861
- Platygaster subuliformis Kieffer, 1926
- Platygaster suecica (Kieffer, 1926)
- Platygaster sugitama Yoshida & Hirashima, 1979
- Platygaster sylea Walker, 1843
- Platygaster sylveni Buhl, 2009
- Platygaster szelenyii Huggert, 1975
- Platygaster tacita Fouts, 1925
- Platygaster tanus Ushakumari, 2004
- Platygaster taras Walker, 1836
- Platygaster taylori MacGown, 1974
- Platygaster tenerifensis Buhl, 2001
- Platygaster tengoei Buhl, 2010
- Platygaster tenuicornis Förster, 1861
- Platygaster tephrosiae
- Platygaster terco Sundholm, 1970
- Platygaster texana Fouts, 1924
- Platygaster tibialis Kieffer, 1905
- Platygaster tisias Walker, 1836
- Platygaster topali Buhl, 2004
- Platygaster topaliana Buhl, 2004
- Platygaster transsylvanica (Szelényi, 1958)
- Platygaster transversiceps Buhl, 1998
- Platygaster tricarinata Buhl, 2014
- Platygaster tripotini Buhl & Choi, 2006
- Platygaster truncata Buhl, 2004
- Platygaster tschirnhausi Buhl, 2014
- Platygaster tsitsikamensis Buhl, 2005
- Platygaster tuberata Kieffer, 1916
- Platygaster tuberculatrix Buhl, 2011
- Platygaster tuberculi (Kieffer, 1916)
- Platygaster tuberosa Nees von Esenbeck, 1834
- Platygaster tuberosula Kieffer, 1926
- Platygaster tubulosa Brues, 1922
- Platygaster tumida (Ashmead, 1893)
- Platygaster tumoricola Kieffer & Jörgensen, 1910
- Platygaster ulmicola Kieffer, 1916
- Platygaster ungeri Buhl, 1999
- Platygaster uniformis Buhl, 2006
- Platygaster urnicola Yamagishi, 1980
- Platygaster urniphila Matsuo & Yamagishi, 2018
- Platygaster utahensis (Ashmead, 1893)
- Platygaster uvulariae
- Platygaster vaccinii
- Platygaster vaenia Walker, 1836
- Platygaster vancouverensis (Ashmead, 1893)
- Platygaster variabilis Fouts, 1924
- Platygaster variarilis Fouts
- Platygaster varicornis Buhl, 1999
- Platygaster vedresi Szabó, 1977
- Platygaster vera Buhl, 1998
- Platygaster verdii Vlug, 1995
- Platygaster vernalis (Myers, 1917)
- Platygaster vernoniae (Ashmead, 1893)
- Platygaster verrucosa Kieffer, 1916
- Platygaster verticalis Buhl, 2003
- Platygaster vestina Walker, 1836
- Platygaster viburni Kieffer, 1916
- Platygaster victoriae MacGown, 1979
- Platygaster vintheri Buhl, 1994
- Platygaster virgo Day, 1971
- Platygaster viticola (Ashmead, 1893)
- Platygaster vitisiellae
- Platygaster vitreus Buhl, 1997
- Platygaster vulgaris Buhl, 1998
- Platygaster walkerae Buhl, 2017
- Platygaster warda Buhl, 2004
- Platygaster websteri Fouts, 1924
- Platygaster xeneus Walker, 1838
- Platygaster yunnanensis Buhl, 2007
- Platygaster zambiana Buhl, 2007
- Platygaster zangherii Szelényi, 1955
- Platygaster zantanus Ushakumari, 2004
- Platygaster zaragozana Buhl, 1998
- Platygaster zavchanensis Buhl, 2004
- Platygaster zethus Walker, 1839
- Platygaster zosine Walker, 1836
- Polygnotus marchali
