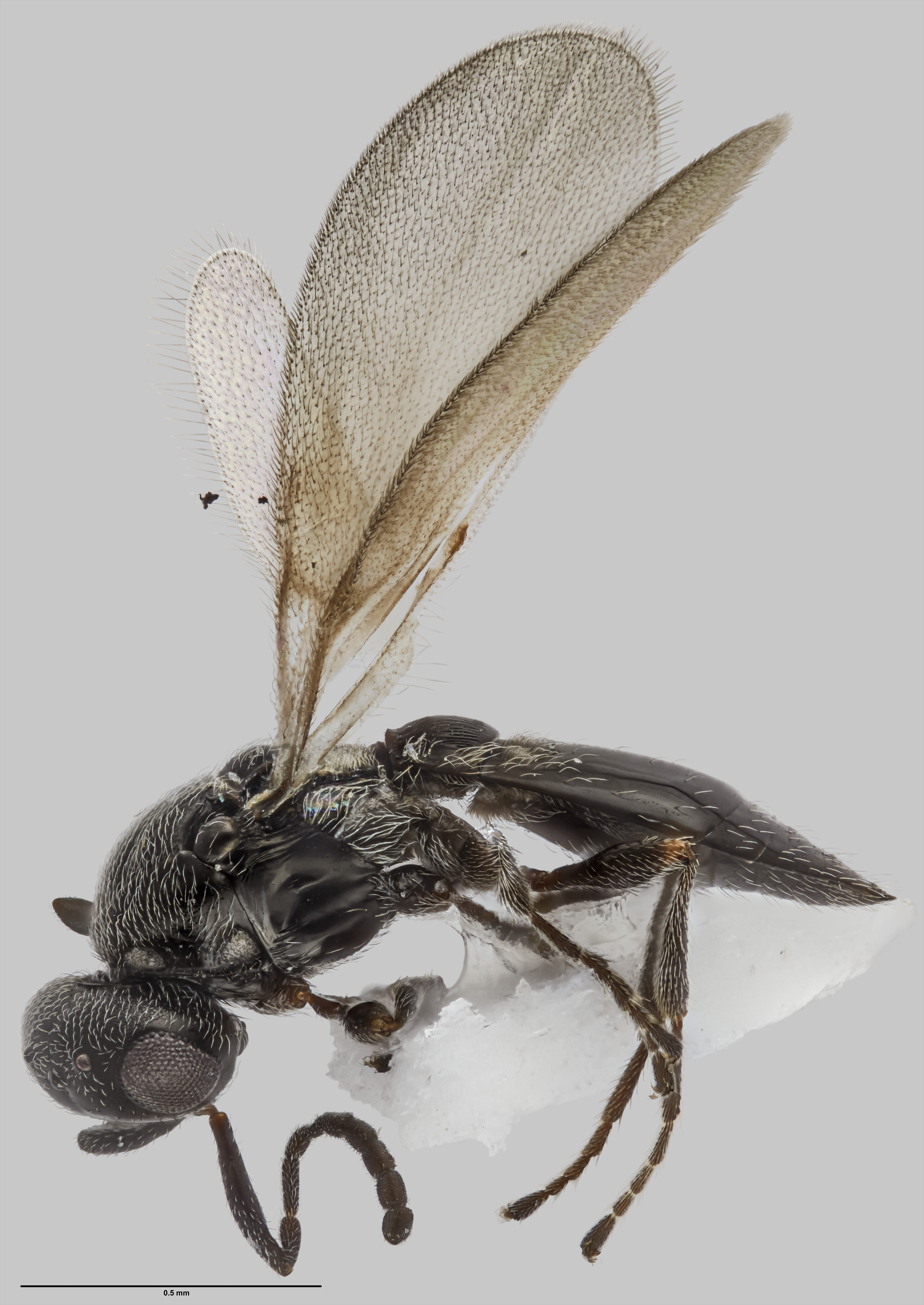
- Zelostemma chionochloae

Scientific classification
- Domain: Eukaryota
- Kingdom: Animalia
- Phylum: Arthropoda
- Class: Insecta
- Order: Hymenoptera
- Family: Platygastridae
- Subfamily: Platygastrinae
- Genus: Zelostemma; Masner & Huggert, 1989

Species
- See text

= Zelostemma =

Genus of parasitoid wasp

Zelostemma is a genus of parasitoid wasps belonging to the family Platygastridae. The genus was described by in 1989, and is endemic to New Zealand.

== Taxonomy ==
Zelostemma was first described by Czech entomologist Lubomír Masner and Swedish entomologist Lars Huggert in 1989, with the prefix Zelo- referring to the genus' origin of New Zealand. The genus was originally a monotypic genus, with the sole member being Zelostemma oleariae, originally described as Eurytoma oleariae by William Miles Maskell in 1888 (later known as Metaclisis oleariae).

Peter Neerup Buhl identified a new species in 2008, Z. chionochloae, two new species in 2011 with Z. altipetiolata, and Z. dromedarium, followed by the addition of 30 new species in 2017.

== Distribution ==
The genus is endemic to New Zealand.

== Species ==
- Zelostemma alpinum Buhl, 2017
- Zelostemma altipetiolata Buhl, 2011
- Zelostemma breviantennatum Buhl, 2017
- Zelostemma brevicaudum Buhl, 2017
- Zelostemma brevistriatum Buhl, 2017
- Zelostemma chionochloae Buhl, 2008
- Zelostemma dromedarium Buhl, 2011
- Zelostemma dugdalei Buhl, 2017
- Zelostemma gastrotrypoideum Buhl, 2017
- Zelostemma gourlayi Buhl, 2017
- Zelostemma inaequale Buhl, 2017
- Zelostemma insulare Buhl, 2017
- Zelostemma laevicornu Buhl, 2017
- Zelostemma laevipetiolatum Buhl, 2017
- Zelostemma latipetiolatum Buhl, 2017
- Zelostemma longiabdominatum Buhl, 2017
- Zelostemma longipedicellatum Buhl, 2017
- Zelostemma masneri Buhl, 2017
- Zelostemma medionitens Buhl, 2017
- Zelostemma munki Buhl, 2017
- Zelostemma nottoni Buhl, 2017
- Zelostemma noyesi Buhl, 2017
- Zelostemma obscurum Buhl, 2017
- Zelostemma oleariae (Maskell, 1888)
- Zelostemma peninsulare Buhl, 2017
- Zelostemma popovicii Buhl, 2017
- Zelostemma rubi Buhl, 2017
- Zelostemma semialatum Buhl, 2017
- Zelostemma striatipetiolatum Buhl, 2017
- Zelostemma terrestre Buhl, 2017
- Zelostemma thorpei Buhl, 2017
- Zelostemma toftei Buhl, 2017
- Zelostemma vilhelmseni Buhl, 2017
- Zelostemma wardi Buhl, 2017
