= Amblyaspis =

Scientific classification
- Kingdom: Animalia
- Phylum: Arthropoda
- Class: Insecta
- Order: Hymenoptera
- Family: Platygastridae
- Subfamily: Platygastrinae
- Genus: Amblyaspis; Förster, 1856

Genus of wasps

Amblyaspis is a genus of parasitoid wasps belonging to the family Platygastridae.

The genus was described in 1856 by Arnold Förster.

The genus has cosmopolitan distribution.

Species:

- Amblyaspis belus
- Amblyaspis crates (Walker, 1835)
- Amblyaspis ctesias (Walker, 1839)
- Amblyaspis emarginata Anjana and Rajmohana, 2015
- Amblyaspis flavibrunneus Dodd, 1924
- Amblyaspis hirsuta Anjana and Rajmohana, 2015
- Amblyaspis prorsa
- Amblyaspis roboris
- Amblyaspis rufistilus Kieffer, 1913
- Amblyaspis rufithorax Kieffer, 1913
- Amblyaspis rufiventris Kieffer, 1913
- Amblyaspis scelionoides (Haliday, 1835)
- Amblyaspis scutellaris Kieffer, 1904
- Amblyaspis tritici (Walker, 1835)
