= Metaclisis =

Scientific classification
- Kingdom: Animalia
- Phylum: Arthropoda
- Class: Insecta
- Order: Hymenoptera
- Family: Platygastridae
- Subfamily: Platygastrinae
- Genus: Metaclisis; Förster, 1856

Genus of wasps

Metaclisis is a genus of parasitoid wasps in the family Platygastridae. There are at least 30 described species in Metaclisis.

== Species ==
These 30 species belong to the genus Metaclisis:

- Metaclisis acericola Masner, 1981
- Metaclisis acerina Masner, 1981
- Metaclisis aceris Masner, 1981
- Metaclisis acuta Masner, 1981
- Metaclisis alticola Masner, 1981
- Metaclisis annae Masner, 1981
- Metaclisis areolata (Haliday, 1836)
- Metaclisis attenuata Masner, 1981
- Metaclisis borealis Masner, 1981
- Metaclisis carinata (Ashmead, 1893)
- Metaclisis ensifer Masner, 1981
- Metaclisis erythroupus Ashmead
- Metaclisis filicornis Masner, 1981
- Metaclisis floridana (Ashmead, 1887)
- Metaclisis longula Masner, 1981
- Metaclisis masoni Masner, 1981
- Metaclisis monheimi (Förster, 1861)
- Metaclisis montagnei Maneval, 1936
- Metaclisis ocalea (Walker, 1838)
- Metaclisis phragmitis Debauche, 1947
- Metaclisis pumilio Masner, 1981
- Metaclisis quinda (Walker, 1842)
- Metaclisis rionegroensis Buhl, 2004
- Metaclisis rufithorax Buhl, 2004
- Metaclisis striatitergitis Szabó, 1959
- Metaclisis suecica Buhl, 2010
- Metaclisis sulcata Masner, 1981
- Metaclisis triangulata (Tomsík, 1950)
- Metaclisis verna Masner, 1981
- Metaclisis vernalis Masner, 1981
