= Platygaster munita =

Scientific classification
- Kingdom: Animalia
- Phylum: Arthropoda
- Class: Insecta
- Order: Hymenoptera
- Family: Platygastridae
- Genus: Platygaster
- Species: P. munita

Binomial name
- Platygaster munita Walker, 1836

Species of wasp

Platygaster munita is a species of parasitoid wasp in the family Platygastridae. It is found in Europe.
