= Zelostemma thorpei =

Scientific classification
- Kingdom: Animalia
- Phylum: Arthropoda
- Clade: Pancrustacea
- Class: Insecta
- Order: Hymenoptera
- Family: Platygastridae
- Genus: Zelostemma
- Species: Z. thorpei

Binomial name
- Zelostemma thorpei Buhl, 2017

Species of parasitoid wasp

Zelostemma thorpei is a species of parasitoid wasp belonging to the family Platygastridae. First described by Peter Neerup Buhl in 2017, it is endemic to New Zealand.

== Taxonomy ==
The species was identified by Danish entomologist Peter Neerup Buhl in 2017, during a review of the genus Zelostemma during which Buhl identified 30 new species from New Zealand entomology collections based on morphological differences. Z. thorpei was identified based on specimens collected from Huia, West Auckland in December 1980 by P. A. Maddison and B. M. May. Buhl named the species after New Zealand amateur entomologist Stephen E. Thorpe.

== Description ==
Females of Z. thorpei have a body length of 1.5 mm (0.059 in), and light brown legs and coxae. The species can be differentiated from Z. laevicornu due to having a differently shaped metasoma.

== Distribution ==
The species is endemic to New Zealand. As of 2024, specimens have only being identified in the vicinity of Huia and the Manukau Harbour in the Auckland Region.
