= Synopeas myles =

Scientific classification
- Kingdom: Animalia
- Phylum: Arthropoda
- Class: Insecta
- Order: Hymenoptera
- Family: Platygastridae
- Genus: Synopeas
- Species: S. myles

Binomial name
- Synopeas myles (Walker, 1836)

Parasitoid hymenopteran

Synopeas myles is a platygastrid parasitoid of Contarinia nasturtii, that, like its host, is native to Europe. It has been considered as a potential biological pest control in North America, where C. nasturtii is invasive.
