= Synopeas hopkinsi =

Scientific classification
- Kingdom: Animalia
- Phylum: Arthropoda
- Class: Insecta
- Order: Hymenoptera
- Family: Platygastridae
- Genus: Synopeas
- Species: S. hopkinsi

Binomial name
- Synopeas hopkinsi (Crawford & Bradley, 1911)

Species of wasp

Synopeas hopkinsi is a species of parasitoid wasp in the family Platygastridae.
