= Platygaster rubi =

Scientific classification
- Kingdom: Animalia
- Phylum: Arthropoda
- Class: Insecta
- Order: Hymenoptera
- Family: Platygastridae
- Genus: Platygaster
- Species: P. rubi

Binomial name
- Platygaster rubi (Ashmead, 1893)

Species of wasp

Platygaster rubi is a species of parasitoid wasp in the family Platygastridae.
