= Metaclisis floridana =

Scientific classification
- Kingdom: Animalia
- Phylum: Arthropoda
- Class: Insecta
- Order: Hymenoptera
- Family: Platygastridae
- Genus: Metaclisis
- Species: M. floridana

Binomial name
- Metaclisis floridana (Ashmead, 1887)

Species of wasp

Metaclisis floridana is a species of parasitoid wasp in the family Platygastridae.
