= Anopedias =

Scientific classification
- Kingdom: Animalia
- Phylum: Arthropoda
- Class: Insecta
- Order: Hymenoptera
- Family: Platygastridae
- Subfamily: Platygastrinae
- Genus: Anopedias; Förster, 1856

Extant species
- Anopedias lacustris; Anopedias obscurus

Genus of wasps

Anopedias is a genus of parasitoid wasps belonging to the family Platygastridae.

The genus was first described by Arnold Förster in 1856.

The species of this genus are found in Northern Europe and North America.

Species:

- Anopedias lacustris
- Anopedias obscurus
