= Rao pselaphus =

Scientific classification
- Kingdom: Animalia
- Phylum: Arthropoda
- Class: Insecta
- Order: Hymenoptera
- Family: Platygastridae
- Subfamily: Platygastrinae
- Genus: Rao; Masner & Huggert, 1989
- Species: R. pselaphus

Binomial name
- Rao pselaphus Masner & Huggert, 1989

Genus of wasps

Rao is a monotypic genus of parasitoid wasps belonging to the family Platygastridae. The only species is Rao pselaphus Masner & Huggert, 1989
