= Trichacis virginiensis =

Scientific classification
- Kingdom: Animalia
- Phylum: Arthropoda
- Class: Insecta
- Order: Hymenoptera
- Family: Platygastridae
- Genus: Trichacis
- Species: T. virginiensis

Binomial name
- Trichacis virginiensis Ashmead, 1893

Species of wasp

Trichacis virginiensis is a species of parasitoid wasp in the family Platygastridae.
