= Trichacis =

Scientific classification
- Kingdom: Animalia
- Phylum: Arthropoda
- Clade: Pancrustacea
- Class: Insecta
- Order: Hymenoptera
- Family: Platygastridae
- Subfamily: Platygastrinae
- Genus: Trichacis; Förster, 1856

Genus of wasps

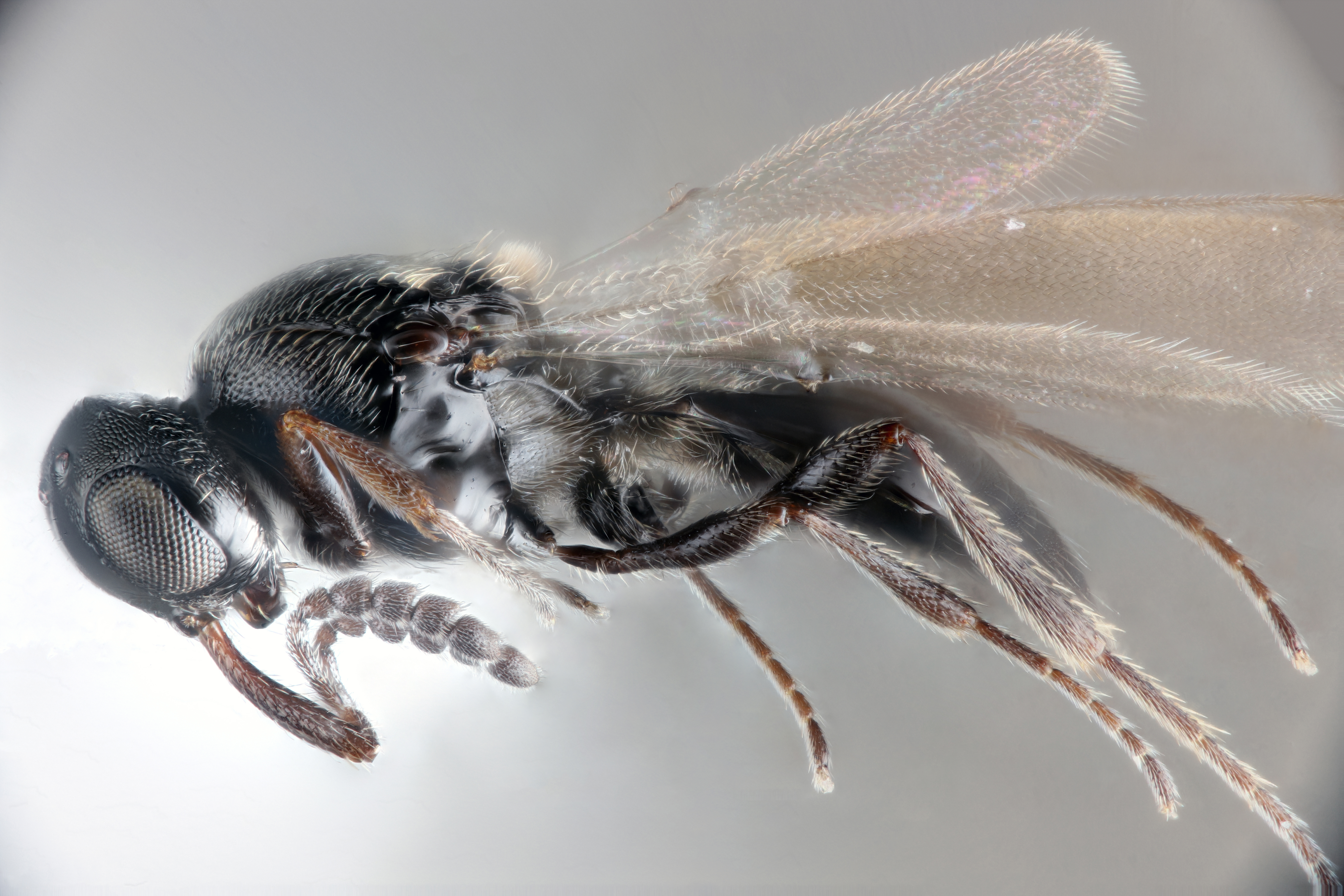
Female specimen of Trichacis tristis, lateral habitus. Collected from Rügen Island, Germany, May 2015.

Trichacis is a genus of parasitoid wasps in the family Platygastridae. Members of this genus have a tuft of setae on the mesoscutellum and transverse striae or rugulae above the antennae. They are parasitoids of Cecidomyiidae, although the hosts of most species remain unknown.

The genus has been revised for the Nearctic, Neotropics, and Europe. There have been more than 60 species described in Trichacis; however, many of these have been since synonymized.

== Species ==
These 66 species belong to the genus Trichacis:

- Trichacis abdominalis Thomson, 1859
- Trichacis acarinata Arias-Penna & Masner
- Trichacis acuminata Arias-Penna & Masner
- Trichacis acuta Arias-Penna & Masner
- Trichacis afurcata Szabó, 1977
- Trichacis alticola Masner, 1983
- Trichacis ariaspennae Buhl, 2011
- Trichacis arizonensis (Ashmead, 1893)
- Trichacis bidentiscutum Szabó, 1981
- Trichacis bison Masner, 1983
- Trichacis celticola Masner, 1983
- Trichacis clypeata Arias-Penna & Masner
- Trichacis colombiana Arias-Penna & Masner
- Trichacis concavata Arias-Penna & Masner
- Trichacis cornicola (Ashmead, 1893)
- Trichacis cornuta Fouts, 1925
- Trichacis corrugata Arias-Penna & Masner
- Trichacis costaricana Arias-Penna & Masner
- Trichacis crossi MacGown, 1989
- Trichacis delsinnei Arias-Penna & Masner
- Trichacis denudata Buhl, 2001
- Trichacis depressa Arias-Penna & Masner
- Trichacis dianae Arias-Penna & Masner
- Trichacis didas (Walker, 1836)
- Trichacis dracula Masner, 1983
- Trichacis elongata Masner, 1983
- Trichacis fernandezi Arias-Penna & Masner
- Trichacis fusciala Szabó, 1981
- Trichacis hajduica Szabó, 1981
- Trichacis hansoni Arias-Penna & Masner
- Trichacis howensis Dodd, 1924
- Trichacis huberi Masner, 1983
- Trichacis hungarica Szabó, 1977
- Trichacis illusor Kieffer, 1916
- Trichacis indica Kieffer, 1907
- Trichacis kaulbarsi Arias-Penna & Masner
- Trichacis khajjiara Mani, 1975
- Trichacis laticornis Buhl, 2001
- Trichacis magnifica Arias-Penna & Masner
- Trichacis mahunkai Szabo, 1981
- Trichacis mandibulata Masner, 1983
- Trichacis meridionalis (Brues, 1910)
- Trichacis mexicana Arias-Penna & Masner
- Trichacis nosferatus Buhl, 1997
- Trichacis opaca Thomson, 1859
- Trichacis panamana Arias-Penna & Masner
- Trichacis pannonica Szabó, 1977
- Trichacis pecki Arias-Penna & Masner
- Trichacis pisis (Walker, 1836)
- Trichacis procera Arias-Penna & Masner
- Trichacis proximata Arias-Penna & Masner
- Trichacis pulchricornis Szelényi, 1953
- Trichacis punctata Arias-Penna & Masner
- Trichacis pyramidalis Masner, 1983
- Trichacis quadriclava Szabó, 1981
- Trichacis remulus (Walker, 1836)
- Trichacis rufipes Ashmead, 1893
- Trichacis sculpturata Arias-Penna & Masner
- Trichacis striata Masner, 1983
- Trichacis tatika Szabó, 1977
- Trichacis texana Fouts, 1925
- Trichacis transversata Arias-Penna & Masner
- Trichacis triangulata Arias-Penna & Masner
- Trichacis tristis (Nees von Esenbeck, 1834)
- Trichacis virginiensis Ashmead, 1893
- Trichacis vitreus Buhl, 1997
