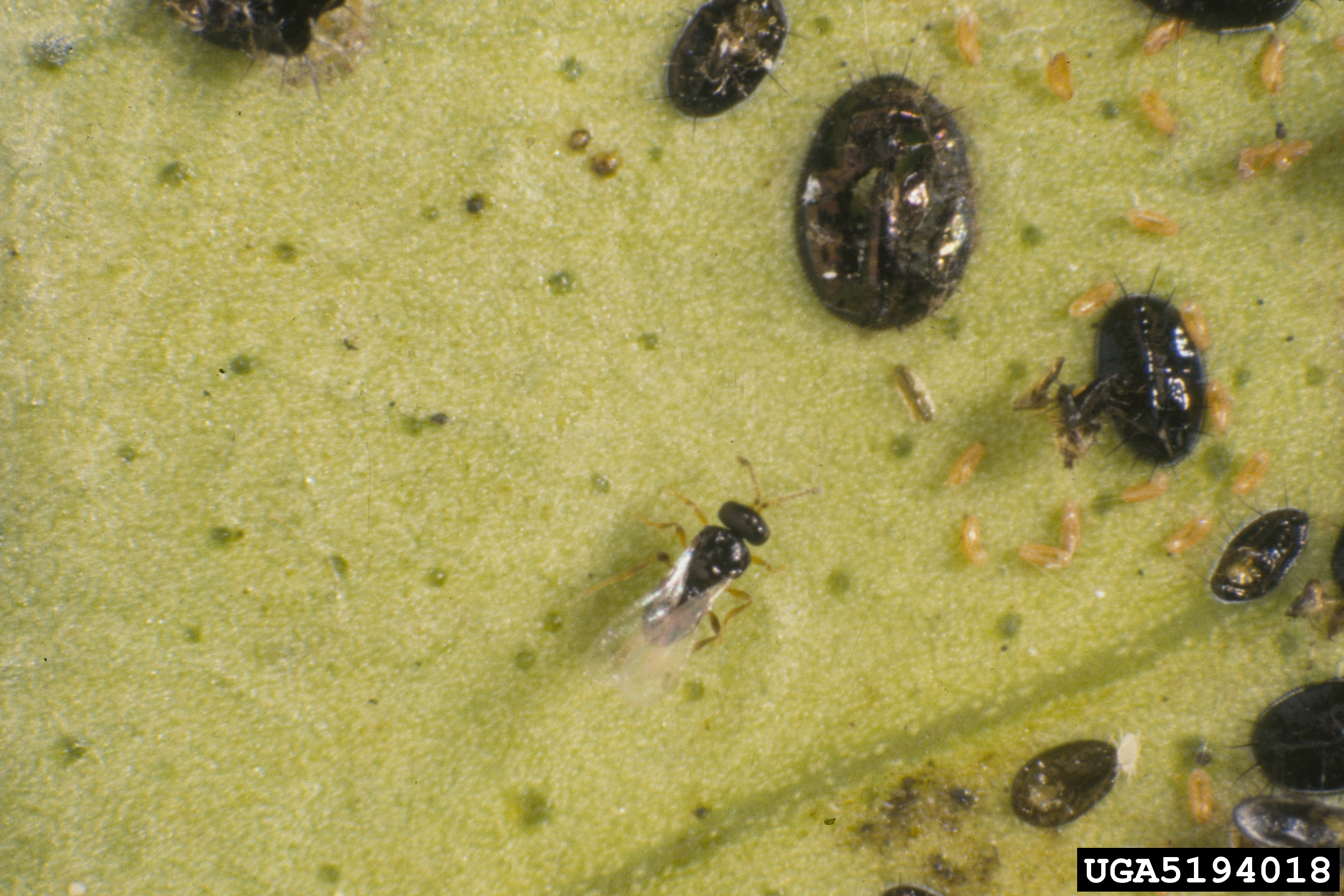
- Adult Amitus hesperidum with eggs, nymphs, and pupae of citrus blackfly (Aleurocanthus woglumi)

Scientific classification
- Kingdom: Animalia
- Phylum: Arthropoda
- Class: Insecta
- Order: Hymenoptera
- Family: Platygastridae
- Subfamily: Sceliotrachelinae
- Genus: Amitus; Haldeman, 1850

= Amitus =

Genus of wasps

Amitus is a genus in the parasitic wasp family Platygastridae. There are at least 16 described species in Amitus.

== Species ==
These 16 species belong to the genus Amitus:

- Amitus aleurodinis Haldeman, 1850
- Amitus aleurolobi Mani, 1939
- Amitus aleurotubae Viggiani & Mazzone, 1982
- Amitus arcturus Whittaker, 1930
- Amitus croesus Hulden, 1986
- Amitus fuscipennis MacGown & Nebeker, 1978
- Amitus gibbosus MacGown & Nebeker, 1978
- Amitus granulosus MacGown & Nebeker, 1978
- Amitus hesperidum Silvestri, 1927
- Amitus longicornis (Förster, 1878)
- Amitus macgowni Evans & Castillo, 1998
- Amitus minervae Silvestri, 1911
- Amitus pigeanus MacGown & Nebeker, 1978
- Amitus rugosus Viggiani & Mazzone, 1982
- Amitus spiniferus (Brèthes, 1914)
- Amitus vesuvianus Viggiani & Mazzone, 1982
