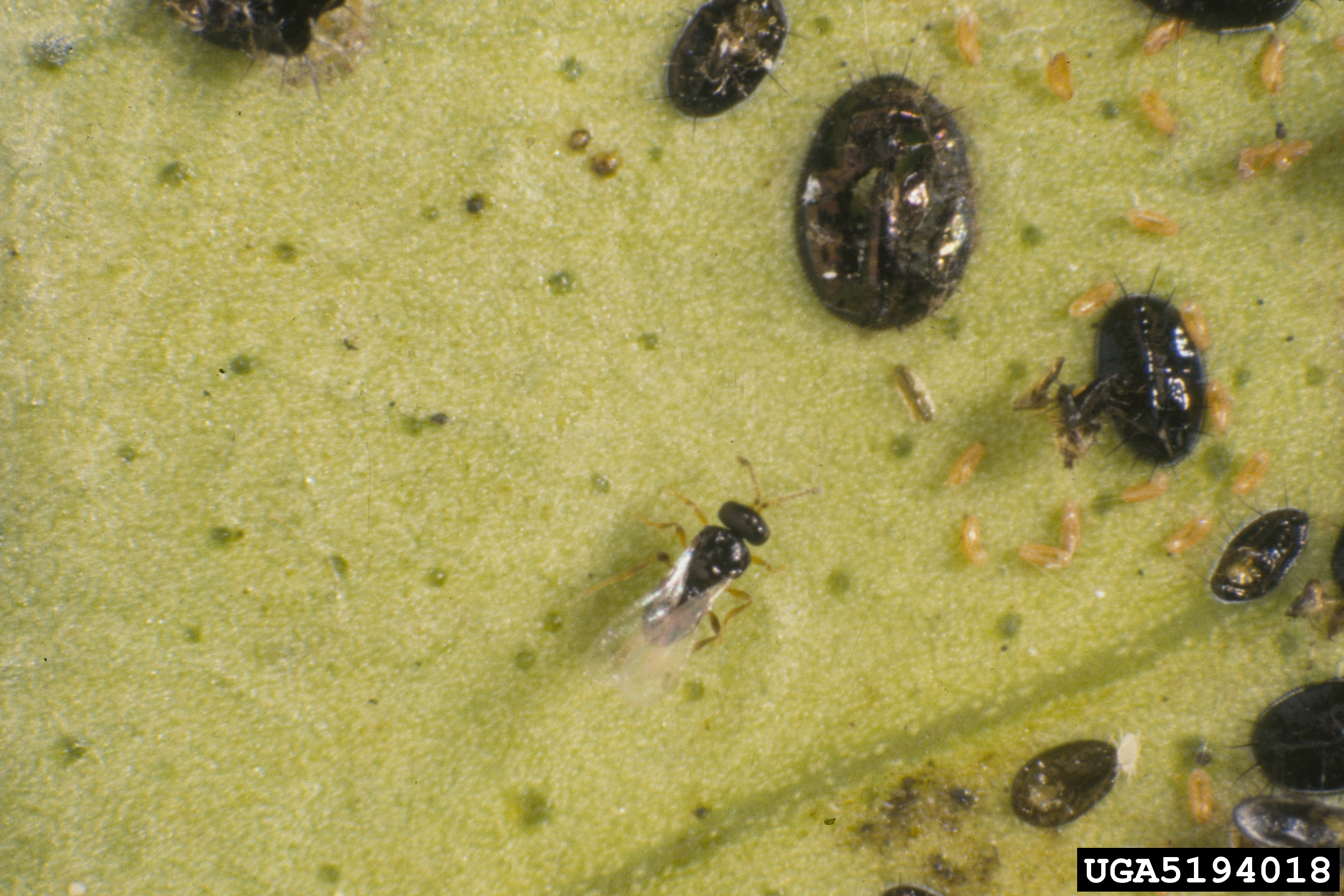
- Amitus hesperidum

Scientific classification
- Kingdom: Animalia
- Phylum: Arthropoda
- Clade: Pancrustacea
- Class: Insecta
- Order: Hymenoptera
- Family: Platygastridae
- Subfamily: Sceliotrachelinae; Brues, 1908

Type genus
- Sceliotrachelus Brues, 1908

= Sceliotrachelinae =

Subfamily of Parasitica

Sceliotrachelinae is a subfamily of wasps in the family Platygastridae.

== Genera ==
This subfamily's 26 accepted genera include:

- Afrisolia Masner & Huggert, 1989
- Aleyroctonus Masner & Huggert, 1989
- Alfredella Masner & Huggert, 1989
- Allotropa Förster, 1856
- Amitus Haldeman, 1850
- Aphanomerella Dodd, 1913
- Aphanomerus Perkins, 1905
- Austromerus Masner & Huggert, 1989
- Calomerella Masner & Huggert, 1989
- Errolium Masner & Huggert, 1989
- Fidiobia Ashmead, 1894
- Helava Masner & Huggert, 1989
- Isolia Förster, 1878
- Nanomerus Masner & Huggert, 1989
- Neobia Masner & Huggert, 1989
- Oligomerella Masner & Huggert, 1989
- Parabaeus Kieffer, 1910
- Platygastoides Dodd, 1913
- Platystasius Nixon, 1937
- Plutomerus Masner & Huggert, 1989
- Pseudaphanomerus Szelényi, 1941
- Pulchrisolia Szabó, 1959
- Sceliotrachelus Brues, 1908
- Tetrabaeus Kieffer, 1912
- Zelamerus Masner & Huggert, 1989
- Zelandonota Masner & Huggert, 1989

== Biology ==
One species, Aphanomerus pusillus, native to Queensland, Australia, has proven effective as a biocontrol agent against the "pandanus planthopper" (Jamella australiae), a serious pest of Pandanus tectorius along the coasts of northern New South Wales and Queensland.
