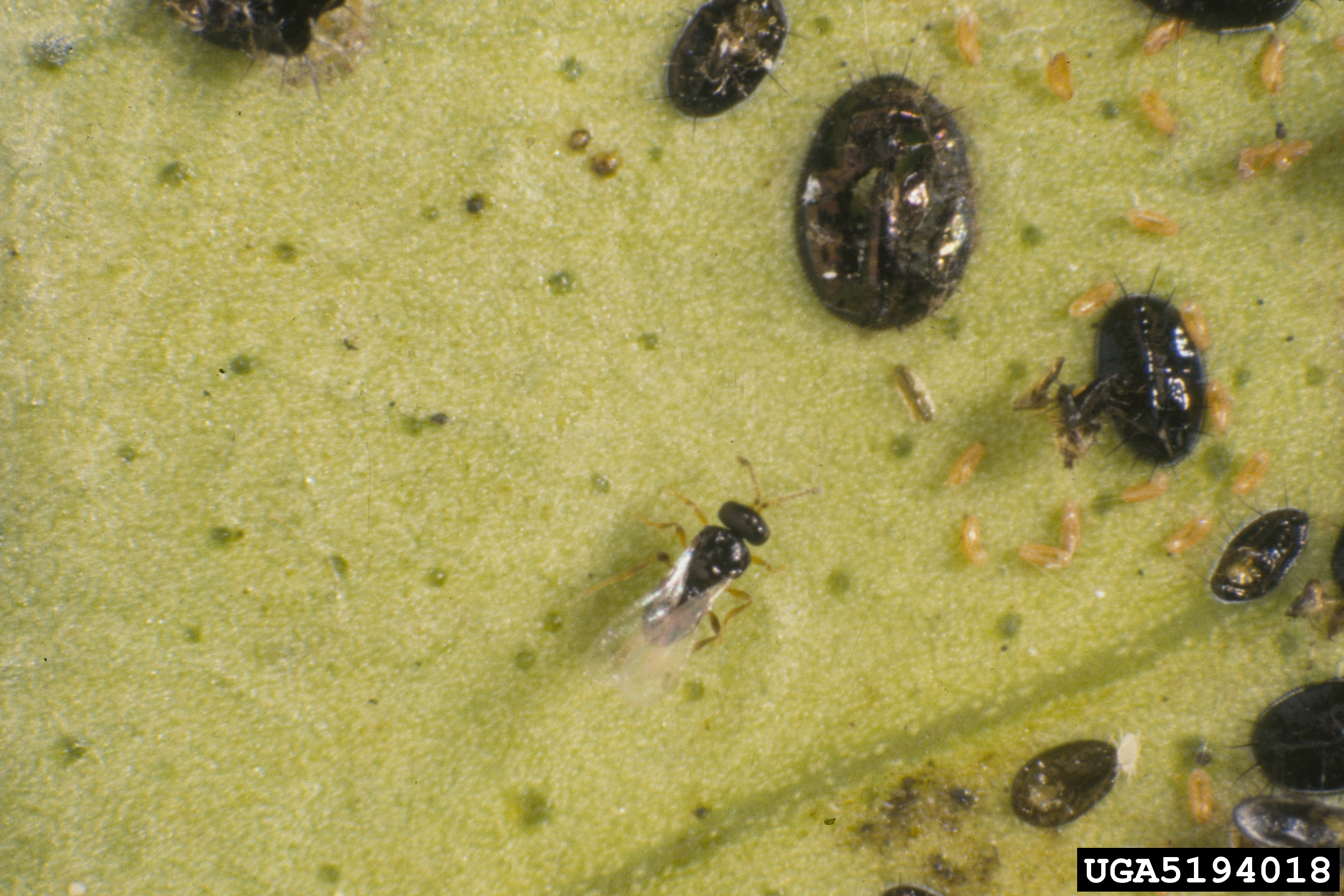
- Adult wasp with eggs, nymphs and pupae of citrus blackfly.

Scientific classification
- Domain: Eukaryota
- Kingdom: Animalia
- Phylum: Arthropoda
- Class: Insecta
- Order: Hymenoptera
- Family: Platygastridae
- Genus: Amitus
- Species: A. hesperidum

Binomial name
- Amitus hesperidum Silvestri, 1927

= Amitus hesperidum =

Species of wasp

Amitus hesperidum is a tiny species of parasitic wasp. It is a parasitoid of the citrus blackfly, Aleurocanthus woglumi, an important pest of citrus trees. It is a native of Asia but has been introduced to many other parts of the world as a means of controlling the citrus blackfly.

== Distribution ==
This wasp is a native of India, Sri Lanka, Pakistan, Hong Kong, Sichuan, Java and Malaysia. It has been introduced to Guam, Venezuela, Mexico and the United States (Texas, Florida and Hawaii) for the purpose of controlling the citrus blackfly.

== Description ==
Both males and females have a shiny black thorax and abdomen less than one millimetre long. The antennae have ten segments and in the female, the last three are widened making the antennae club-shaped. The males have longer antennae of a uniform width, curved, with all segments longer than they are wide and covered with short bristly hairs. Both antennae and legs are straw coloured and the hind tarsi have five segments. The wings are shiny and translucent.

== Life cycle ==
Several offspring may develop inside a single host but this species is not polyembryonic. The eggs are laid in any of the larval stages of the citrus blackfly but the first instar is preferred. A female larval host results in the production of two or three adult wasps but parasitism of a male pupa produces only one. Parasitism of a female pupa may result in either a male or a female adult wasp. The time taken for an egg to develop into an adult varies from 45 to 60 days under laboratory conditions at a temperature of 27 °C. The wasps live for three to five days in the field during which time the female can produce up to sixty eggs. This wasp is well synchronized with its host and is capable of controlling dense populations of the pest. However it is not good at searching out scattered individuals and its numbers decrease sharply as its host population is controlled. Other hosts which are also parasitised include Aleurocanthus citriperdus and Aleurocanthus spiniferus.

== Use in biological control ==
Amitus hesperidum was introduced into Mexico in the 1960s in an attempt to control the numbers of citrus blackfly there. Suppression of the pest was so successful that introductions were also made into Florida in 1978 and into Texas in 1983. Encarsia perplexa is another citrus blackfly parasitoid that has been used alongside Amitus hesperidum to control the pest in both states. E. perplexa multiplies more slowly but is better at scouting for outlying blackflies and is more effective when populations of potential hosts are lower.

In Hawaii, both species were introduced in 1999 after the citrus blackfly was discovered there for the first time the previous year. They rapidly became established and were soon controlling the pest on the island of Oahu. Later releases on other islands in the group have also been an effective means of reducing infestations.
