= Leptacis =

Scientific classification
- Kingdom: Animalia
- Phylum: Arthropoda
- Class: Insecta
- Order: Hymenoptera
- Family: Platygastridae
- Genus: Leptacis; Förster, 1856

Genus of wasps

Leptacis is a genus of parasitoid wasps belonging to the family Platygastridae.

The genus has cosmopolitan distribution.

Species:

- Leptacis abdomintor Fouts
- Leptacis acanthia Buhl, 2005
- Leptacis nydia (Walker 1835)
- Leptacis spinigera (Nees, 1834)
- Leptacis tipulae (Kirby, 1798)
