= Isocybus =

Scientific classification
- Kingdom: Animalia
- Phylum: Arthropoda
- Class: Insecta
- Order: Hymenoptera
- Family: Platygastridae
- Genus: Isocybus; Förster, 1856

Genus of wasps

Isocybus is a genus of parasitoid wasps belonging to the family Platygastridae.

The species of this genus are found in Europe and North America.

Species:

- Isocybus antennalis Kieffer, 1916
- Isocybus ascendens Kieffer, 1913
- Isocybus grandis (Nees, 1834)
