= Iphitrachelus =

Scientific classification
- Domain: Eukaryota
- Kingdom: Animalia
- Phylum: Arthropoda
- Class: Insecta
- Order: Hymenoptera
- Family: Platygastridae
- Genus: Iphitrachelus; Haliday, 1836

Genus of wasps

Iphitrachelus is a genus of parasitoid wasps belonging to the family Platygastridae.

The genus has almost cosmopolitan distribution.

Species:

- Iphitrachelus africanus Huggert, 1976
- Iphitrachelus canadensis Masner, 1976
