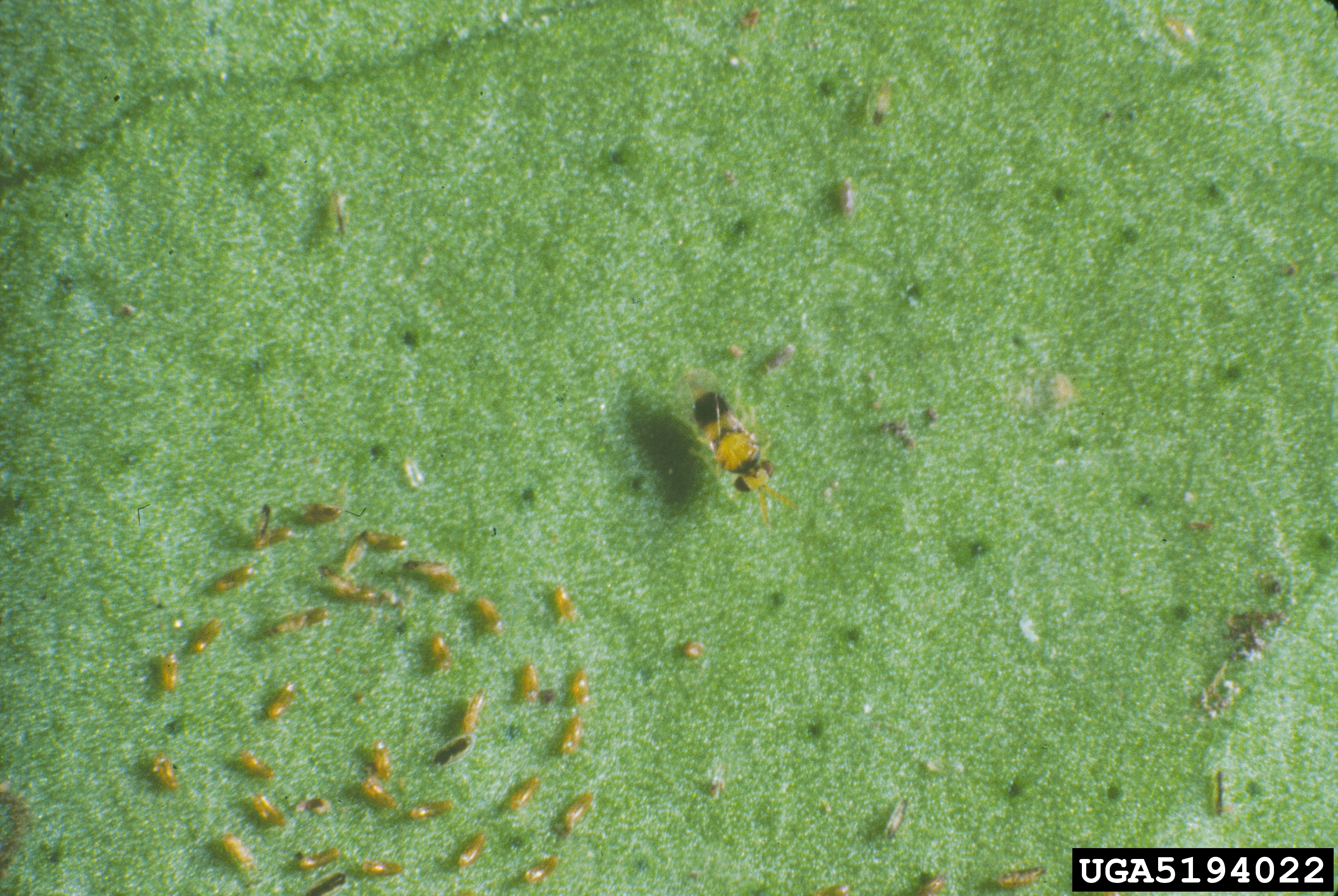
- Adult Encarsia perplexa with eggs and hatching nymphs of citrus blackfly parasite

Scientific classification
- Domain: Eukaryota
- Kingdom: Animalia
- Phylum: Arthropoda
- Class: Insecta
- Order: Hymenoptera
- Family: Aphelinidae
- Subfamily: Coccophaginae
- Genus: Encarsia
- Species: E. perplexa

Binomial name
- Encarsia perplexa Huang & Polaszek, 1998

Synonyms
- Encarsia opulenta

= Encarsia perplexa =

Species of wasp

Encarsia perplexa is a tiny parasitic wasp, a parasitoid of the citrus blackfly, Aleurocanthus woglumi, which is a global pest of citrus trees. It was originally misidentified as Encarsia opulenta, but was recorded as a new species in 1998. It is a native of Asia but has been introduced to many other parts of the world as a means of controlling the citrus blackfly.

== Distribution ==
This wasp is a native of India and Vietnam. It has been introduced to and has established itself in Barbados, Cuba, Jamaica, Mexico, Salvador, Venezuela, the USA (Florida, Texas and Hawaii), Kenya and Oman, for the purpose of controlling citrus blackfly.

== Description ==
The female is just over one millimetre long with antennae 0.8 millimetre in length. The thorax is straw coloured, the wings are transparent with a smoky patch in the centre and the legs are whitish. The abdomen is straw-coloured at the front and dark brown behind with a dark-coloured ovipositor 0.5 millimetres long. The male is smaller, averaging 0.75 millimetres in length and is a uniform dark brown.

== Life cycle ==
After mating, a female lays diploid eggs in nymphs of the citrus blackfly. When available, a second instar nymph is selected and each egg will eventually produce a female adult. At 24 °C in the laboratory, it takes 30 to 35 days from egg-laying to adult emergence. Unmated females lay haploid eggs in the fully developed larvae of their own species. These hatch out into males, a process known as adelphoparasitism. The sex ratio among adults in the field is one male to every seven females. Encarsia perplexa is itself parasitized by Encarsia smithi which was accidentally introduced into Florida in the 1970s.

== Use in biological control ==
The only hosts that have been identified for Encarsia perplexa are Aleurocanthus woglumi and Aleurocanthus incertus, another whitefly. This means that introducing the species into a citrus growing area is unlikely to have adverse ecological side effects. Amitus hesperidum is another citrus blackfly parasitoid that has been used alongside E. perplexa to control the pest. It reproduces rapidly and can produce up to seventy progeny per female and is very successful at controlling heavy infestations. E. perplexa multiplies more slowly but is better at scouting for outlying blackflies and is more effective when populations of potential hosts are lower.

In Hawaii, both species were introduced in 1999 after the citrus blackfly was discovered there for the first time the previous year. They rapidly became established and were soon controlling the pest on the island of Oahu. Later releases on other islands in the group have also been an effective, though not immediate, means of reducing infestations.
