= Isostasius =

Scientific classification
- Domain: Eukaryota
- Kingdom: Animalia
- Phylum: Arthropoda
- Class: Insecta
- Order: Hymenoptera
- Family: Platygastridae
- Genus: Isostasius; Förster, 1856

Genus of wasps

Isostasius is a genus of parasitoid wasps belonging to the family Platygastridae.

The species of this genus are found in Europe and America.

Species:

- Isostasius affinis (Förster, 1861)
- Isostasius apillosioculus Szabó, 1981
