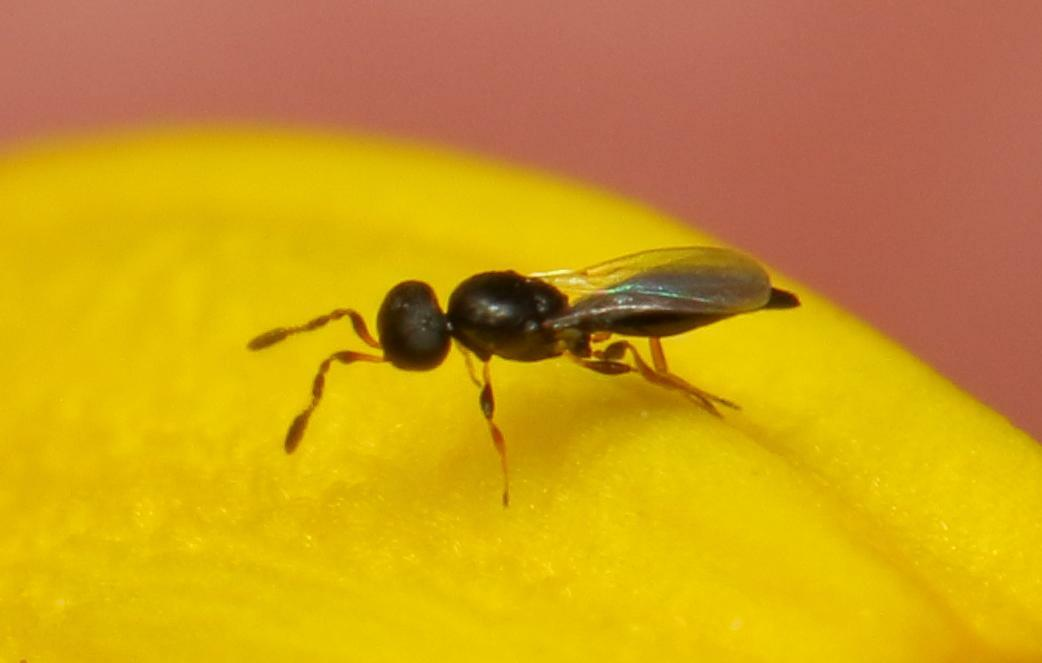

Scientific classification
- Kingdom: Animalia
- Phylum: Arthropoda
- Class: Insecta
- Order: Hymenoptera
- Family: Platygastridae
- Genus: Acerotella; Masner, 1964

= Acerotella =

Genus of wasps

Acerotella is a genus of parasitoid wasps belonging to the family Platygastridae.

The genus was described in 1964 by Lubomír Masner.

The genus has cosmopolitan distribution.

Species:

- Acerotella acerina Masner, 1980
- Acerotella aceris Masner, 1980
- Acerotella aldrovandii Buhl, 2002
- Acerotella boter (Walker, 1838)
- Acerotella confusa (Ashmead, 1894)
- Acerotella depressa Masner, 1980
- Acerotella evanescens (Kieffer, 1914)
- Acerotella gouleti Masner, 1980
- Acerotella humilis (Kieffer, 1913)
- Acerotella hungarica (Szelényi, 1938)
- Acerotella krylovi Buhl, 2002
- Acerotella nearctica Masner, 1980
- Acerotella oblongisubcostaliceps (Szabó, 1981)
- Acerotella silvicola (Szabó, 1981)
- Acerotella tschirnhausi Buhl, 2014
- Acerotella vockerothi Masner, 1980
