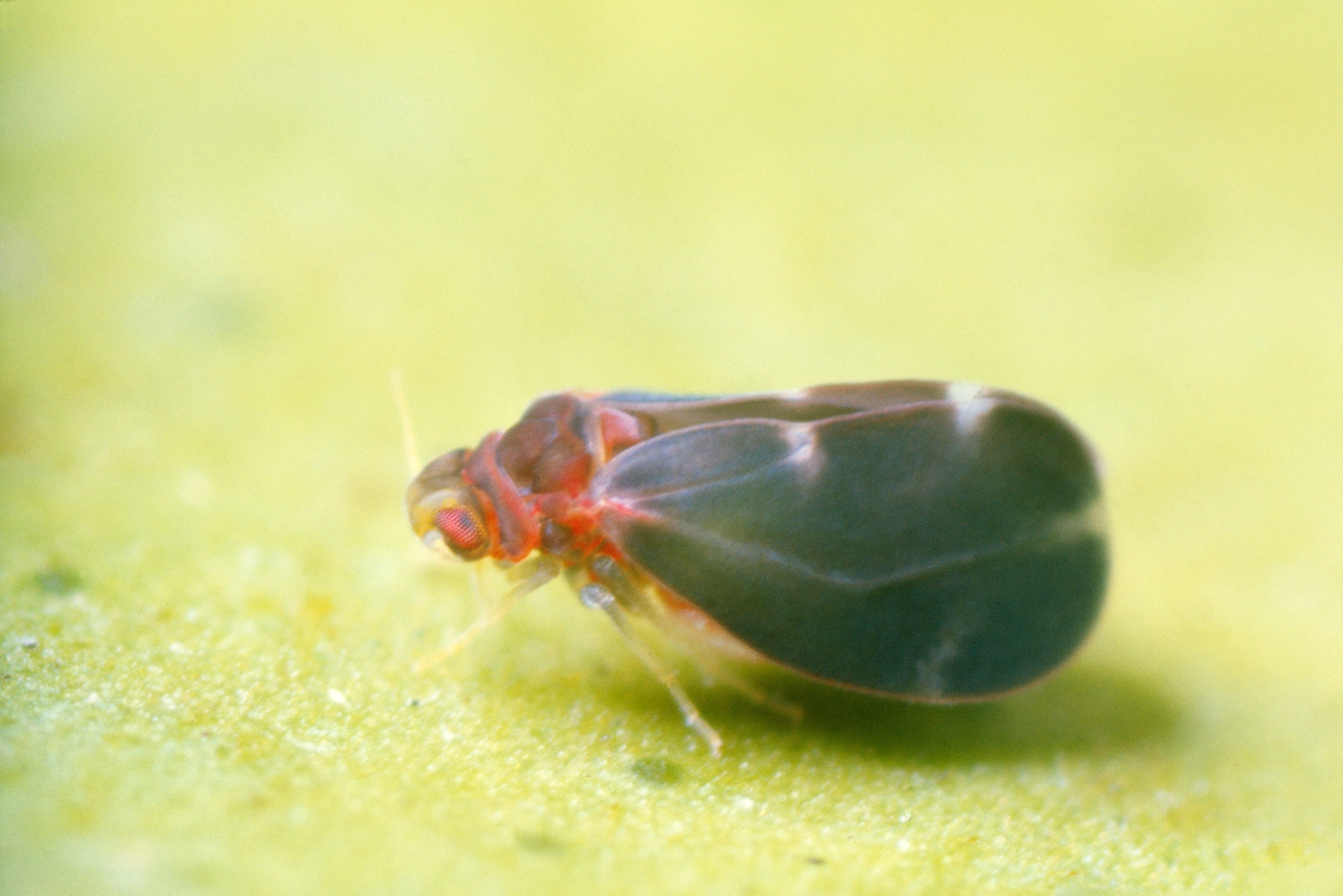
- Citrus blackfly

Scientific classification
- Domain: Eukaryota
- Kingdom: Animalia
- Phylum: Arthropoda
- Class: Insecta
- Order: Hemiptera
- Suborder: Sternorrhyncha
- Family: Aleyrodidae
- Genus: Aleurocanthus
- Species: A. woglumi

Binomial name
- Aleurocanthus woglumi Ashby, 1915

= Aleurocanthus woglumi =

Citrus pest from India, now worldwide

Aleurocanthus woglumi is a species of whitefly in the family Aleyrodidae. It is a pest of citrus crops, and is commonly known as the citrus blackfly because of its slate-blue colour. It originated in Asia, but has spread to other parts of the world. The parasitic wasps, Encarsia perplexa and Amitus hesperidum can help control the pest.

== Distribution ==
This species is native to India, but also occurs in other parts of Asia, Africa, Central and South America, Mexico, the West Indies, Jamaica, and the United States (Florida, Texas, and Hawaii).

== Host species ==
The citrus blackfly is found on over 300 host plant species, but citrus trees such as lemon, orange and pomelo are most heavily infested. Noncitrus trees and shrubs, when they grow by themselves, are not normally attacked by this insect, but they may be when they grow close to heavy infestations on citrus. In Hawaii, such trees as mango, avocado, pink tecoma, and surinam cherry have hosted colonies.

== Lifecycle ==
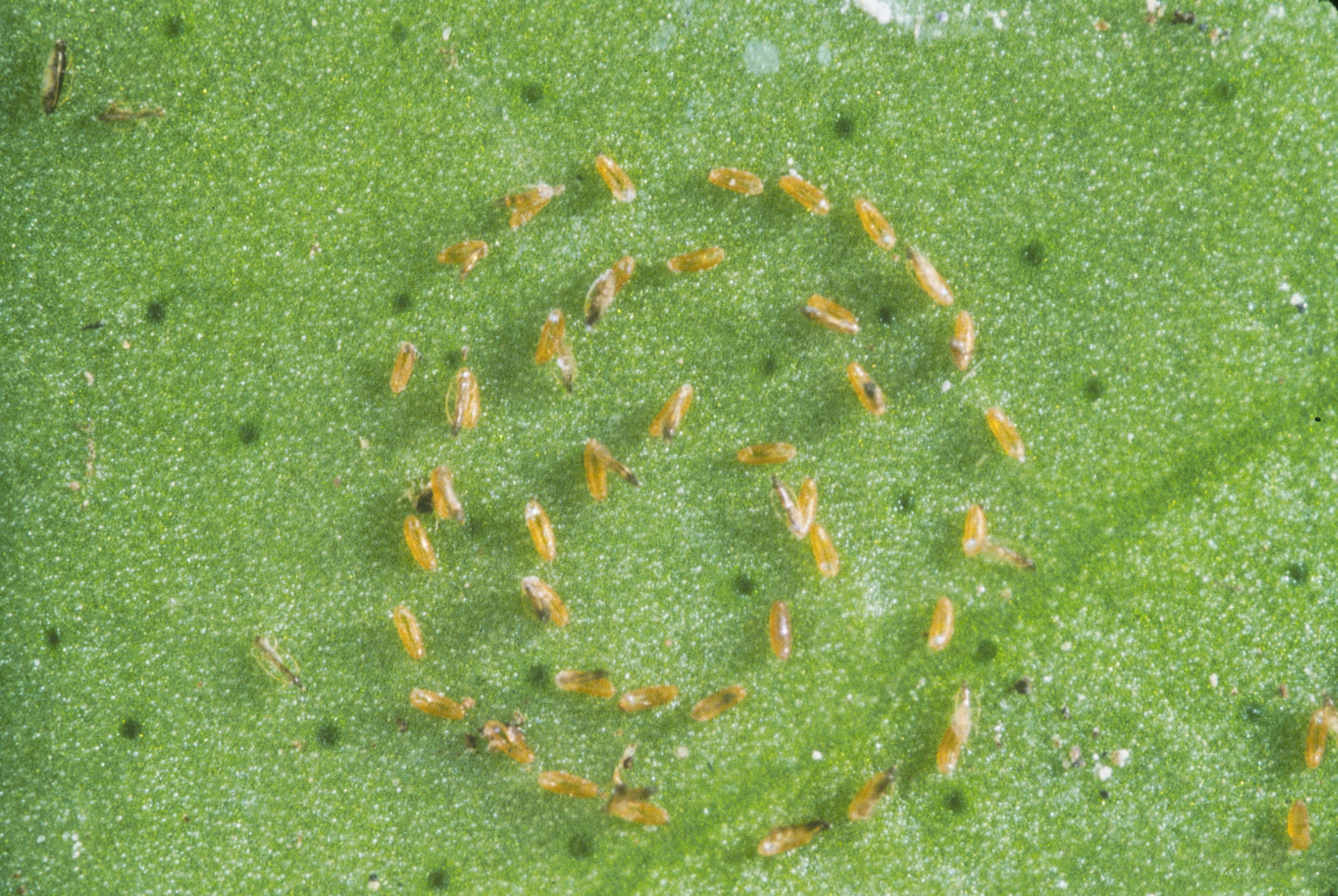
Nymphs hatching from eggs

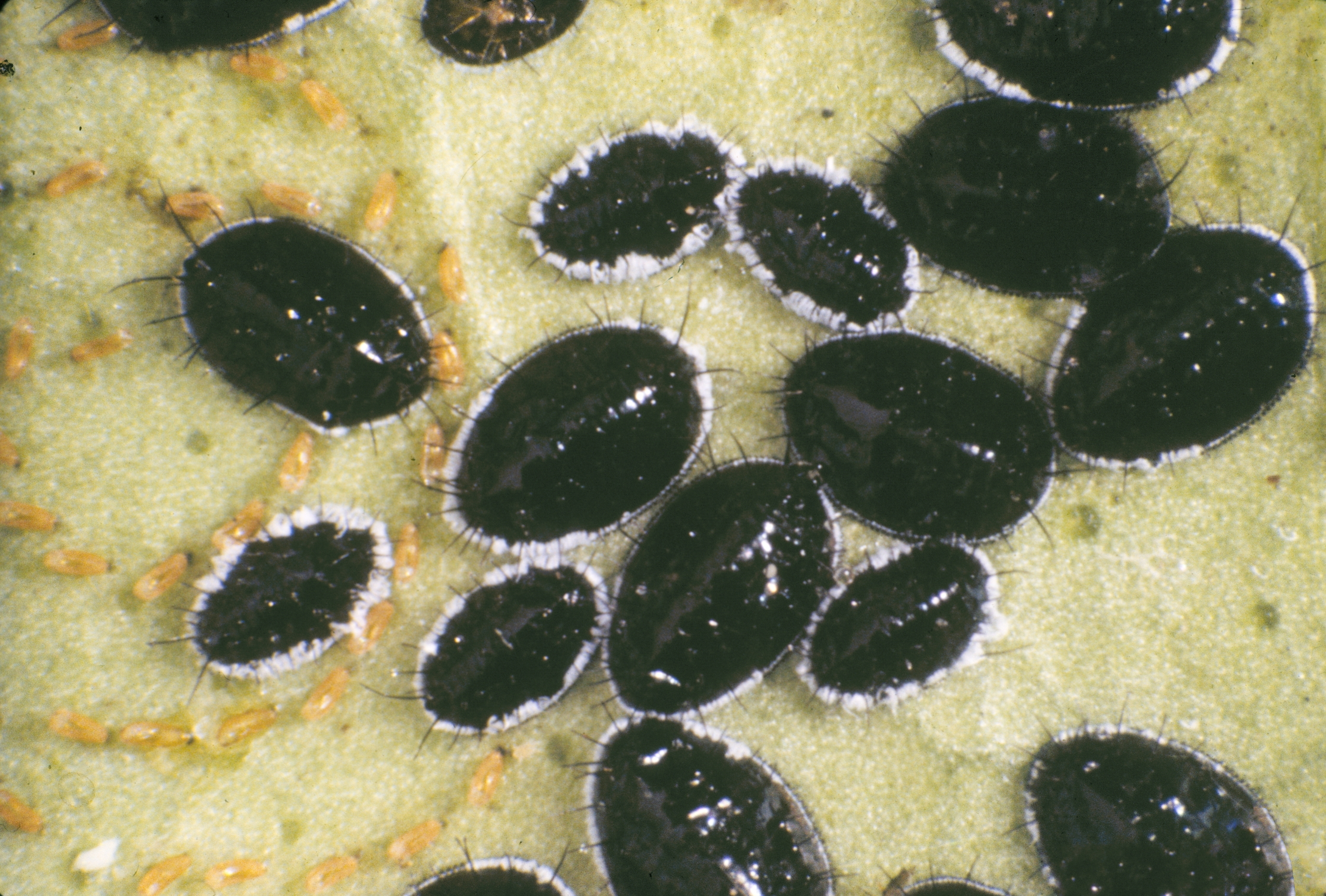
Pupae and eggs

The female blackfly lays batches of eggs in a spiral pattern on the undersides of leaves. The eggs are golden-brown, but darken before hatching, which happens in seven to 10 days.

The nymph moults three times. The first instar is a brown, elongated oval shape, about 0.30 mm (3/256 in) long with two transparent filaments curling back over the body. The second instar is a darker brown and has short spines on its body. It measures about 0.40 mm (1/64 in) long. The third instar is glossy black with many stout spines and measures about 0.87 millimetres (9/256 in) long by 0.74 mm (7/256 in) wide. The larval stages last three to 9 weeks.

The pupa is ovate and black, with short bristles and a marginal fringe of waxy secretion.

The adult, when it first emerges, has a pale-yellow head, whitish legs and reddish-brown eyes. Soon afterwards, it darkens, developing a fine covering of waxy powder which gives it a slate-blue appearance. The wings are angled and held in a tented fashion. The whole lifecycle takes from 45 to 130 days, depending largely on the temperature.

== Damage ==
The principal harm done by the citrus blackfly is the sucking of the tree's sap, which deprives it of both water and nutrients. The excretion of honeydew coats the leaf surfaces and encourages the growth of sooty mold. This can severely impair both leaf respiration and photosynthesis. The combination of all these factors causes a decline in the health and vigour of the tree and a reduction in fruit yield.

== Management ==
The citrus blackfly has a number of natural enemies. The most effective agents for controlling it in Florida are the parasitic wasps, Encarsia perplexa and Amitus hesperidum. The former has a lower rate of reproduction than does A. hesperidum, but is better able to search out suitable hosts. The latter is well synchronized with its host, as adult female wasps are ready to lay their eggs at about the same time as suitable larval stages of the blackfly are present. These species have been used in biological control of the pest. For example, both species were introduced into Hawaii in 1999 after discovery of the presence of the citrus blackfly the previous year. Both wasps have succeeded in establishing themselves and are helping to reduce the damage done by the pest.

The use of insecticides may help to control infestations temporarily, but this is not advised because of the adverse effects on the environment and any existing predators. The application of an oil emulsion may be effective and less toxic. A sufficiency of water and appropriate applications of fertiliser will encourage growth and minimise damage.
