= Allotropa (wasp) =

Scientific classification
- Domain: Eukaryota
- Kingdom: Animalia
- Phylum: Arthropoda
- Class: Insecta
- Order: Hymenoptera
- Family: Platygastridae
- Subfamily: Sceliotrachelinae
- Genus: Allotropa; Förster, 1856

Genus of wasps

Allotropa is a genus of parasitoid wasp in the family Platygastridae. The genus has an almost cosmopolitan distribution.

== Species ==
- Allotropa antennalis Buhl, 2001
- Allotropa ashmeadi Muesebeck, 1939
- Allotropa burrelli Muesebeck, 1943
- Allotropa citri Muesebeck, 1954
- Allotropa conventus Maneval, 1936
- Allotropa convexifrons Muesebeck, 1943
- Allotropa europus Walker, 1838
- Allotropa helenae Kozlov, 1997
- Allotropa jacobsoni Ogloblin, 1926
- Allotropa japonica Ashmead, 1904
- Allotropa kamburovi Annecke & Prinsloo, 1977
- Allotropa loundsburyi Ashmead, 1901
- Allotropa magnini Risbec, 1955
- Allotropa mecrida Walker, 1836
- Allotropa meridionalis Brethes, 1913
- Allotropa merrilli Muesebeck, 1954
- Allotropa muesebecki Buhl, 2002
- Allotropa musae Buhl, 2005
- Allotropa oracellae Masner, 2004
- Allotropa pallidicornis Buhl, 2002
- Allotropa pauliani Risbec, 1955
- Allotropa prosper Nixon, 1942
- Allotropa scutellata Muesebeck, 1954
- Allotropa subclavata Muesebeck, 1970
- Allotropa thompsoni Fullaway, 1913
- Allotropa transvesiceps Buhl, 2002
- Allotropa utilis Muesebeck, 1939
