= Inostemma =

Scientific classification
- Kingdom: Animalia
- Phylum: Arthropoda
- Clade: Pancrustacea
- Class: Insecta
- Order: Hymenoptera
- Family: Platygastridae
- Genus: Inostemma; Haliday, 1833

Genus of wasps

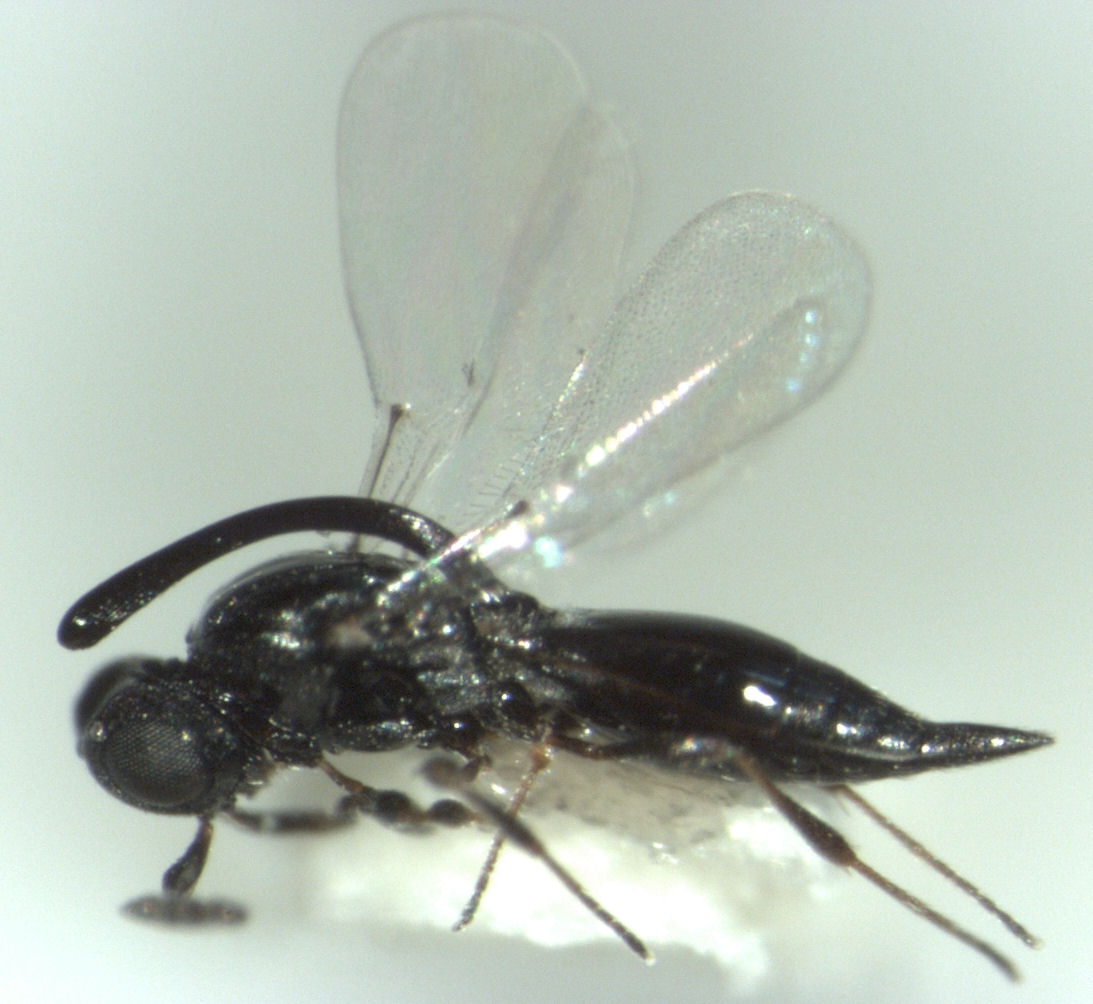
Adult female Inostemma boscii

Inostemma is a genus of parasitoid wasps belonging to the family Platygastridae.

The genus has cosmopolitan distribution.

Species:

- Inostemma abnormale Tomsík, 1950
- Inostemma abnorme Perkins, 1910
- Inostemma ambilobei (Risbec, 1955) - endemic to Madagascar
- Inostemma bonessi Buhl, 2006
- Inostemma contariniae Szelenyi, 1938 - West Palearctic distribution
- Inostemma discessus Szelenyi, 1939
- Inostemma matsutama - found in Asia
- Inostemma melicerata Walker, 1835
- Inostemma menippus Walker, 1835
- Inostemma seoulis - found in Asia
- Inostemma transversiceps Buhl, 2015 - endemic to Madagascar
