= Euxestonotus =

Scientific classification
- Domain: Eukaryota
- Kingdom: Animalia
- Phylum: Arthropoda
- Class: Insecta
- Order: Hymenoptera
- Family: Platygastridae
- Genus: Euxestonotus; Fouts, 1925

Genus of wasps

Euxestonotus is a genus of parasitoid wasps belonging to the family Platygastridae.

The species of this genus are found in Europe and America.

Species:

- Euxestonotus achilles Buhl, 1998
- Euxestonotus acuticornis Buhl, 1995
