= Piestopleura =

Scientific classification
- Domain: Eukaryota
- Kingdom: Animalia
- Phylum: Arthropoda
- Class: Insecta
- Order: Hymenoptera
- Family: Platygastridae
- Genus: Piestopleura; Förster, 1856

Genus of wasps

Piestopleura is a genus of insects belonging to the family Platygastridae.

The genus has almost cosmopolitan distribution.
