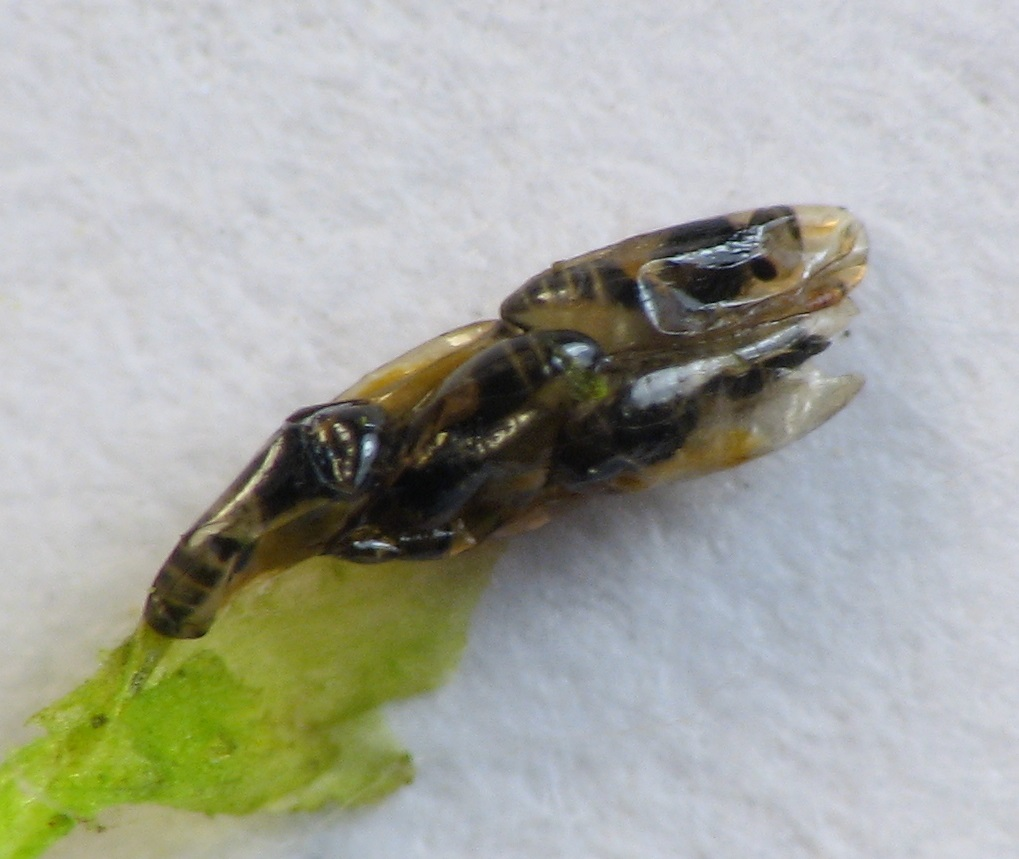
- Platygaster pupae inside gall

Scientific classification
- Kingdom: Animalia
- Phylum: Arthropoda
- Class: Insecta
- Order: Hymenoptera
- Family: Platygastridae
- Subfamily: Platygastrinae
- Genus: Platygaster; Latreille, 1809

Synonyms
- Polygnotus Foerster, 1856; Pyrgaspis Kozlov, 1967; Anirama Kozlov, 1970; Criomica Kozlov, 1975; Huggertella Notton, 2006

= Platygaster =

Genus of wasps

Platygaster sp. in copula. Filmed on a fallen beech in a forest near Marburg, Hesse, Germany

Platygaster is a genus of parasitoid wasps in the family Platygastridae. There are more than 560 described species in Platygaster.

== See also ==
- List of Platygaster species
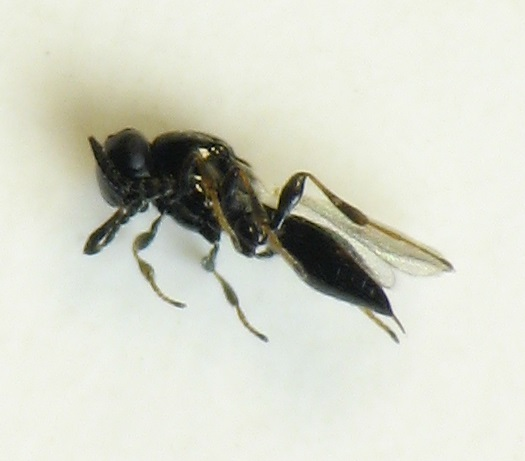
Platygaster sp. female

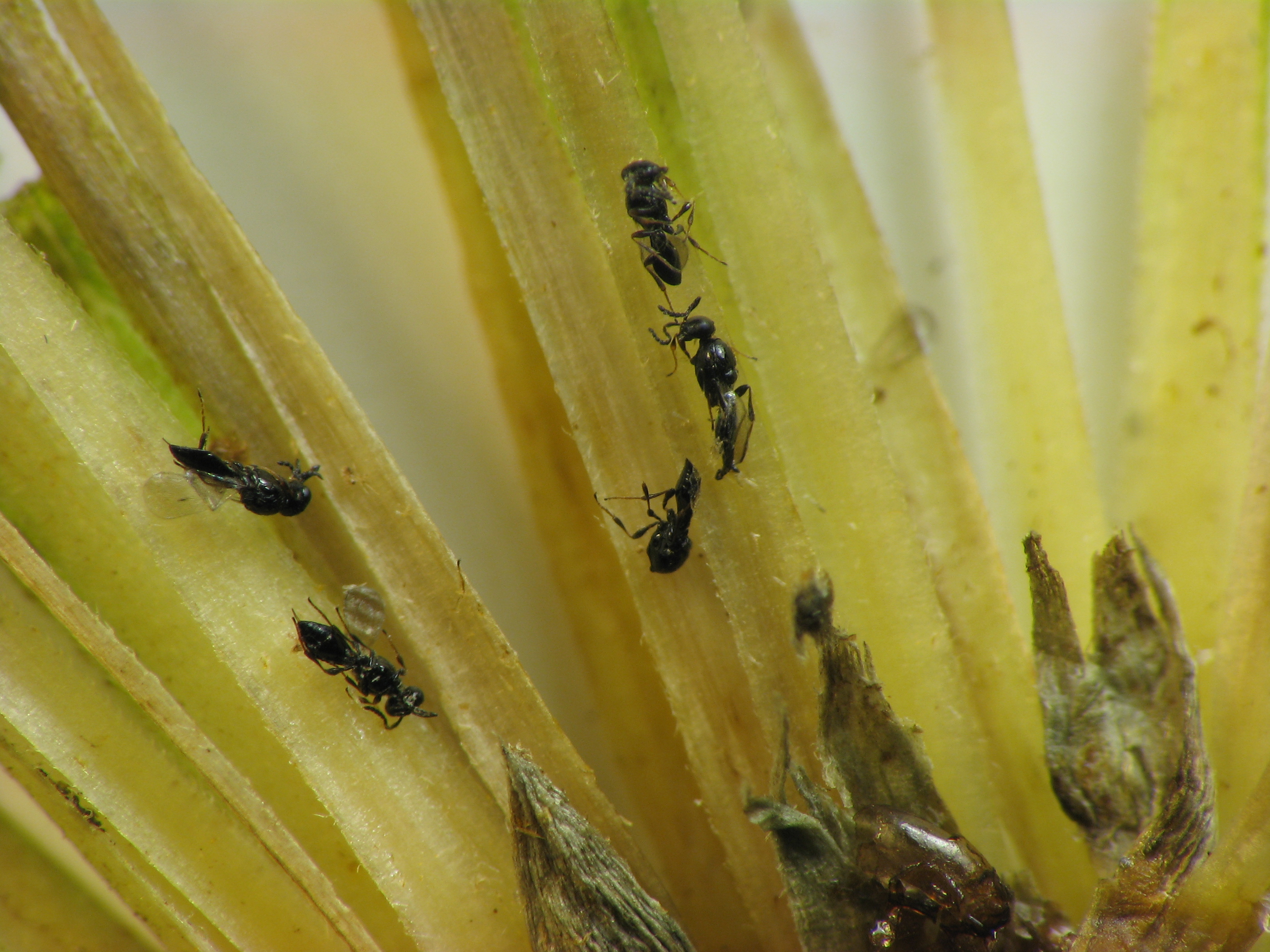
Platygaster sp. on goldenrod

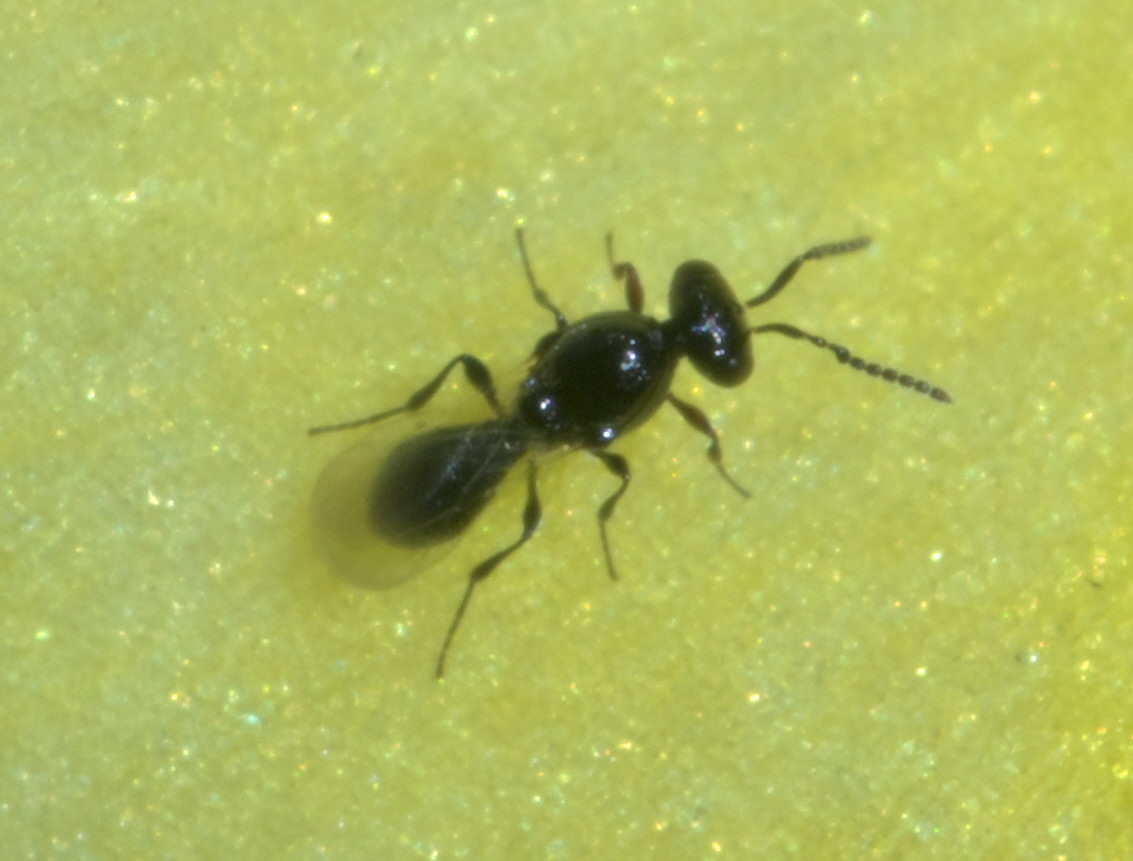
Platygaster
