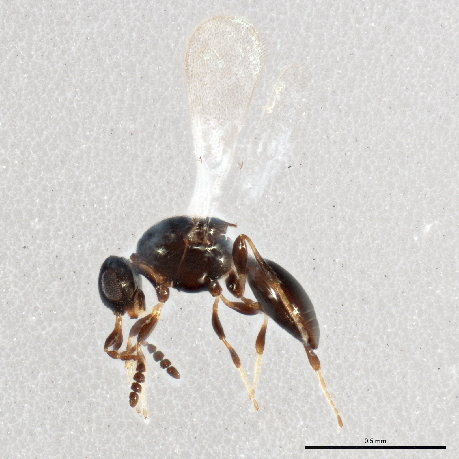
- Synopeas pennsylvanicum

Scientific classification
- Kingdom: Animalia
- Phylum: Arthropoda
- Class: Insecta
- Order: Hymenoptera
- Family: Platygastridae
- Subfamily: Platygastrinae
- Genus: Synopeas; Förster, 1856

Diversity
- at least 250 species

= Synopeas =

Genus of wasps

Synopeas is a genus of parasitoid wasps in the family Platygastridae. There are about 400 described species in Synopeas.

== See also ==
- List of Synopeas species
