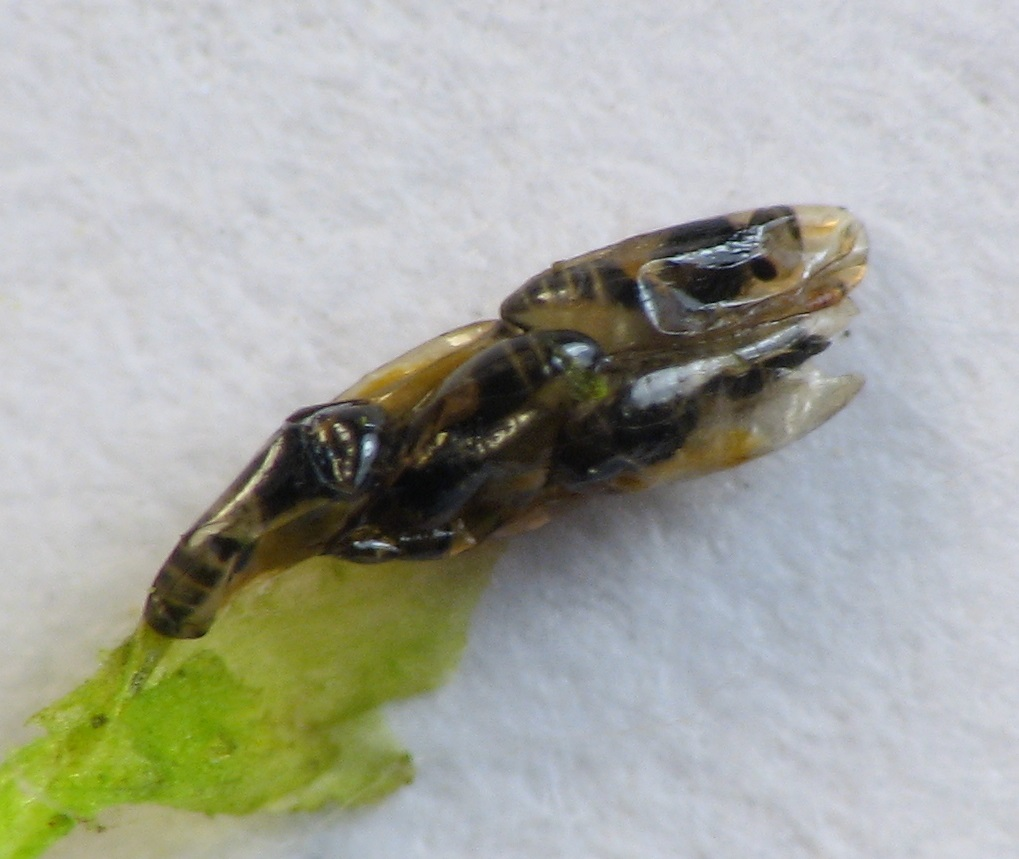
- Platygaster pupae inside gall

Scientific classification
- Kingdom: Animalia
- Phylum: Arthropoda
- Clade: Pancrustacea
- Class: Insecta
- Order: Hymenoptera
- Superfamily: Platygastroidea
- Family: Platygastridae; Haliday, 1833

Subfamilies
- Platygastrinae; Sceliotrachelinae

= Platygastridae =

Platygastridae Temporal range: Cenomanian–Recent
- Adult of Platygaster ingeniosus

Family of wasps

The hymenopteran family Platygastridae (sometimes incorrectly spelled Platygasteridae) is a moderate-sized group (about 2000 described species) of exclusively parasitoid wasps, mostly very small (1–2 mm), black, and shining, with geniculate (elbowed) antennae that usually have an eight-segmented flagellum. The wings often lack visible venation, and they may have slight fringes of setae.

Platygaster sp. in copula

The traditional subfamilies are the Platygastrinae and the Sceliotrachelinae. The former subfamily includes some 40 genera, all of which are koinobionts on cecidomyiid flies; the wasp oviposits in the host's egg or early instar larva, and the wasp larva completes development when the host reaches the prepupal or pupal stage. The latter subfamily is much smaller, including some 20 genera, and they typically have the rudiments of a vein in the forewings. They are generally idiobionts, attacking the eggs of either beetles or Hemiptera.

Platygastridae is one of seven extant families in the superfamily Platygastroidea. For a brief period of time, Scelionidae was considered a subfamily of Platygastridae, but the classification has been revised based on molecular and morphological evidence.

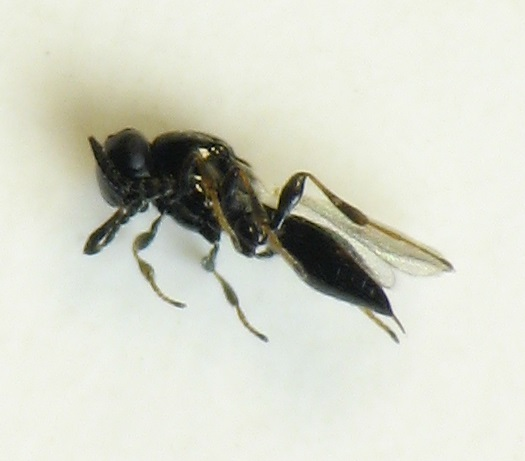
Platygaster sp. female

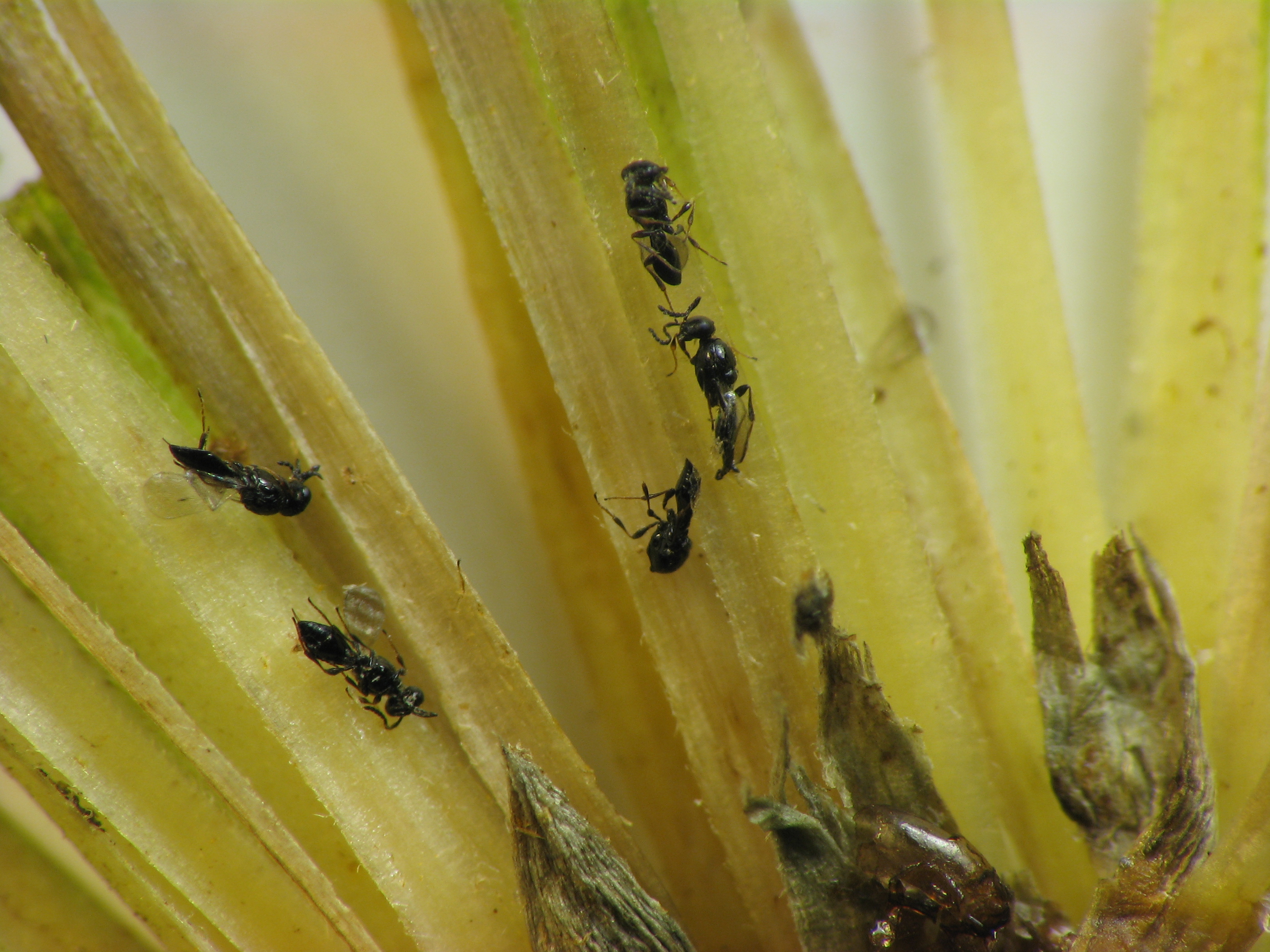
Platygaster sp. on goldenrod (Solidago)
