= List of moths of Riccarton Bush =

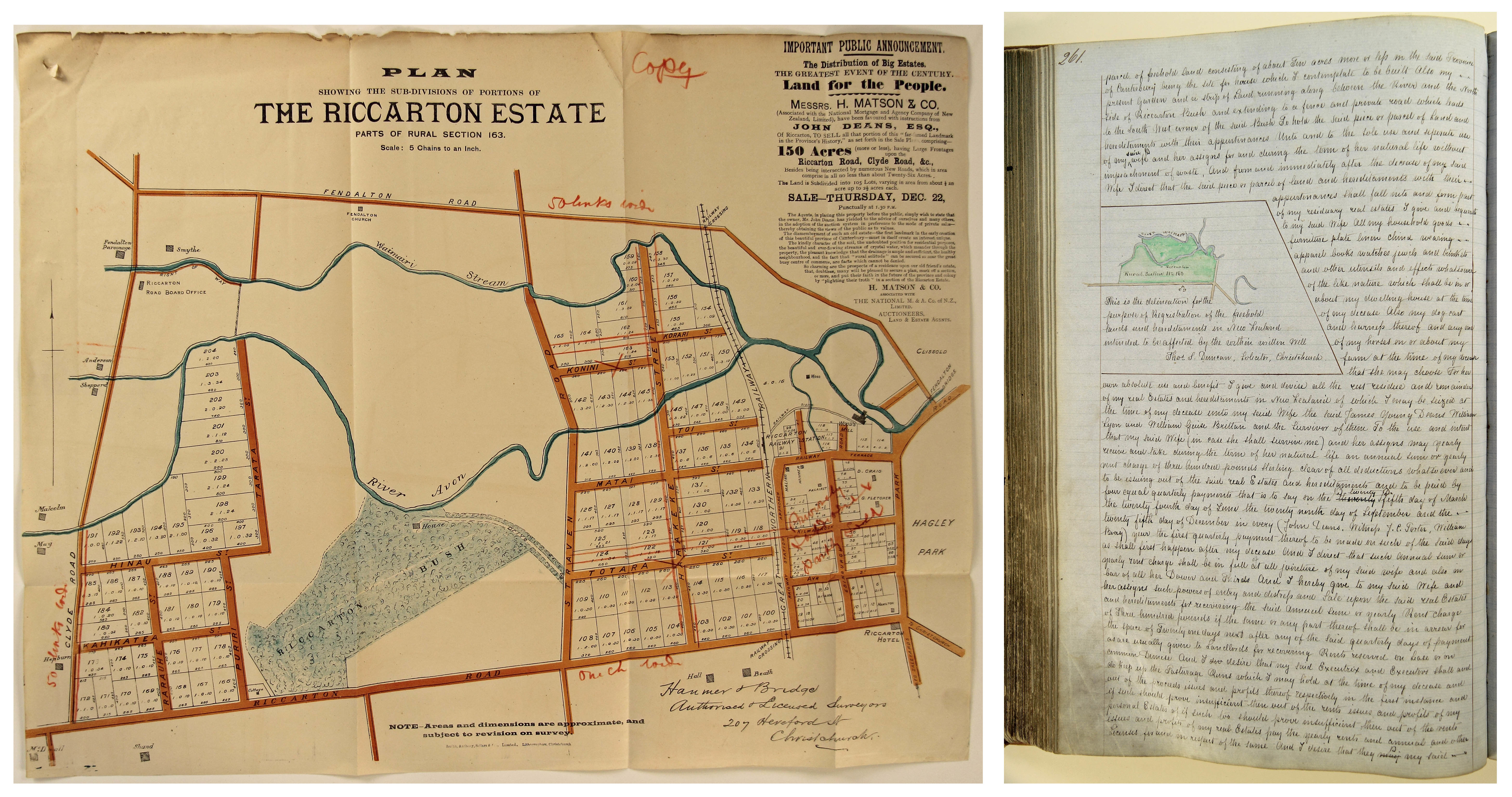
Archive document showing Riccarton Estate containing Riccarton Bush

Riccarton Bush is in the city of Christchurch in the suburb of Riccarton, New Zealand. The bush is a small remnant (7.8 hectares or 19 acres) of lowland kahikatea floodplain forest on the Canterbury Plains. It has played an important part in the history of entomology in New Zealand with many famous entomologists studying the insects and spiders found there. The order of Lepidoptera has been well studied; of the families found in New Zealand 70% have been collected in the bush.

The majority of families that make up the order of Lepidoptera are moths. This page provides a link to individual species that have been collected from Riccarton Bush.

== Geometridae ==
- Asaphodes aegrota Butler, 1879
- Austrocidaria similata Walker, 1862
- Chalastra ochrea Howes, 1911
- Chloroclystis filata (filata moth) Guenee, 1857
- Declana floccosa (forest semilooper) Walker, 1858
- Declana niveata Butler, 1879
- Epiphryne undosata C. Felder, R. Felder & Rogenhofer, 1875
- Epiphryne verriculata (cabbage tree moth) C. Felder, R. Felder & Rogenhofer, 1875
- Gellonia dejectaria (brown evening moth) Walker, 1860
- Helastia cinerearia Doubleday in White and Doubleday, 1843
- Homodotis megaspilata Walker, 1862
- Orthoclydon praefectata (Walker, 1861)
- Pseudocoremia fenerata C. Felder, R. Felder & Rogenhofer, 1875
- Pseudocoremia suavis (common forest looper) Butler, 1879
- Sestra humeraria Walker, 1861
- Xanthorhoe semifissata Walker, 1862
- Xyridacma alectoraria Walker, 1860
- Xyridacma ustaria Walker, 1863
