= Sestra =

Sestra (Russian: Сестра, 'Sister') may refer to:

== Rivers in Russia ==
- Sestra (Leningrad Oblast), a tributary of the Gulf of Finland in Leningrad Oblast
- Sestra (Moscow Oblast), a tributary of the Dubna in the Moscow and Tver Oblasts

== Other ==
- Sestra (moth), a genus of moths in the family Geometridae
