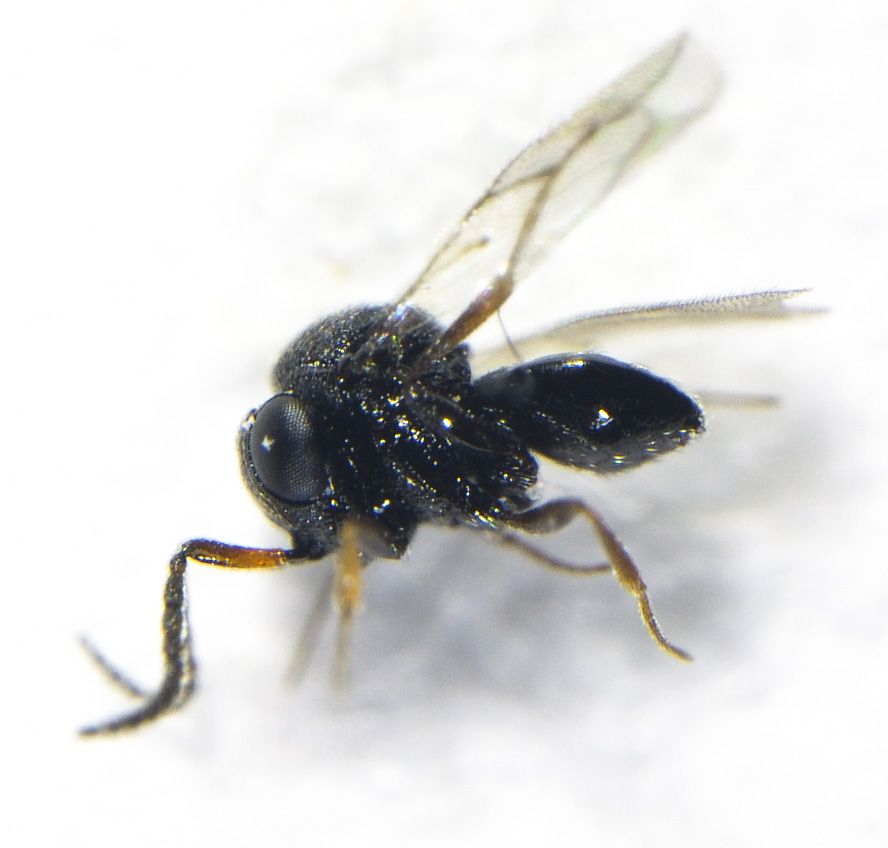
- Trissolcus oenone male

Scientific classification
- Kingdom: Animalia
- Phylum: Arthropoda
- Class: Insecta
- Order: Hymenoptera
- Family: Scelionidae
- Genus: Trissolcus
- Species: T. oenone

Binomial name
- Trissolcus oenone (Dodd, 1913)

Synonyms
- Telenomus oenone Dodd, 1913; Telenomus otho Dodd, 1914; Trissolcus otho (Dodd, 1914); Telenomus obliteratus Dodd, 1914; Trissolcus obliteratus (Dodd, 1914); Telenomus biproruli Girault, 1926; Trissolcus biproruli (Girault, 1926); Telenomus wilsoni Dodd, 1930; Trissolcus wilsoni (Dodd, 1930)

= Trissolcus oenone =

Species of wasp

Trissolcus oenone is a parasitoid wasp in the family Platygastridae, native to Australia and New Zealand. It parasitises the eggs of stink bugs (Pentatomidae), but little is known about its biology.

== Description ==
Trissolcus oenone is a small black wasp, 1–2mm in length (depending on host), and shares many morphological similarities with other Australian Trissolcus species. The New Zealand population can generally be separated from other New Zealand Trissolcus species based on the colour of parasitised eggs, and the colour of the legs and antennae. Pentatomid eggs parasitised by Trissolcus oenone develop a black ring near the top of the egg, whereas those parasitised by T. basalis turn almost entirely black. Adult specimens of T. oenone have black patches on the bases of the legs, while T. basalis legs are uniformly orange.

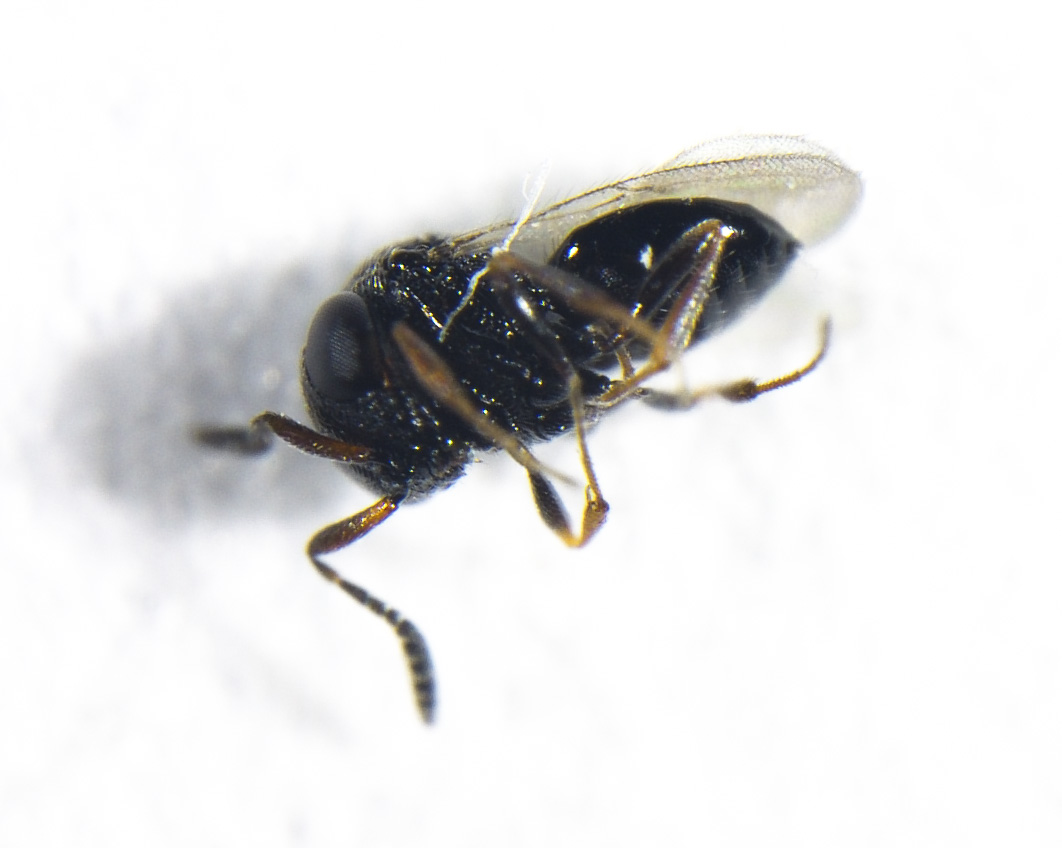
Female specimen showing the clubbed antennae characteristic in female scelionid parasitoids.

== Ecology ==
Trissolcus oenone is very common in Australia where it is known to parasitise the eggs of Biprorulis bibax, Cermatulus nasalis, Cuspicona privata, Nezara viridula, Oechalia consocialis, Oechalia schellenbergii, and Plautia affinis. In New Zealand, T. oenone has been recorded from native species Cermatulus nasalis and Glaucias amyoti, and the introduced species Cuspicona simplex, Dictyotus caenosus, Monteithiella humeralis, and Oechalia schellenbergii. Female parasitoids lay an egg into a host egg, and the emerging wasp larva develops inside the host egg. The length of development depends on the host species and temperature.
