= Potato bug =

Potato bug may refer to:

== Species ==
- Armadillidium vulgare, a species of woodlouse
- Colorado potato beetle
- Cuspicona simplex, commonly known as the green potato bug
- Jerusalem cricket, an insect

== Other uses ==
- Potato Bug, a character in The Mr. Potato Head Show
- A style of mandolin with a body constructed of contrasting woods, resembling the striped markings of the potato beetle
