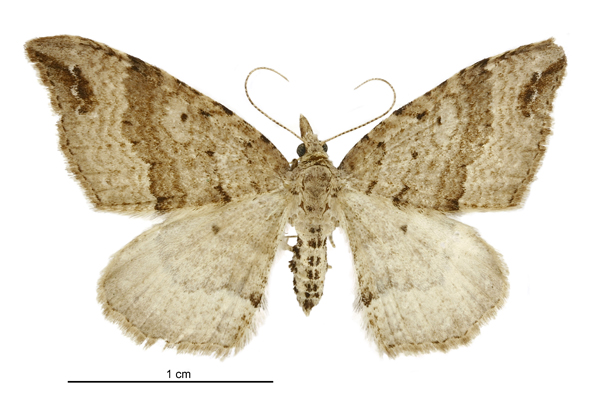
- Female
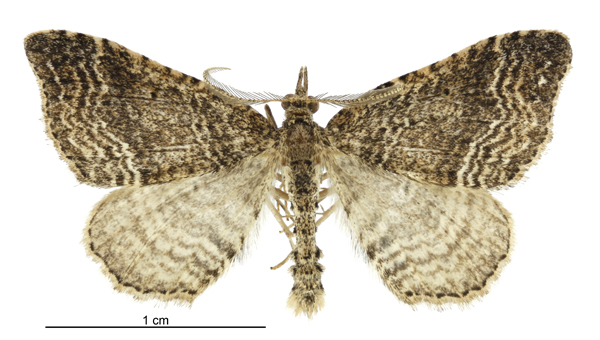
- Male

Scientific classification
- Kingdom: Animalia
- Phylum: Arthropoda
- Class: Insecta
- Order: Lepidoptera
- Family: Geometridae
- Genus: Homodotis
- Species: H. falcata

Binomial name
- Homodotis falcata (Butler, 1879)

Synonyms
- Larentia? falcata Butler, 1879; Xanthorhoe falcata (Butler, 1879); Larentia? rufescens Butler, 1879; Asaphodes rufescens (Butler, 1879); Eurydice cymosema Meyrick, 1883

= Homodotis falcata =

Species of moth endemic to New Zealand

Homodotis falcata is a moth of the family Geometridae. It is endemic to New Zealand and is found in the southern part of the South Island. The larvae of this species feed on leaf litter and adults are on the wing for most months of the year. The forewings of this species can vary in depth of colour.

== Taxonomy ==
This species was first described in 1879 by Arthur Gardiner Butler and tentatively placed in the genus Larentia. Butler used a male specimen collected in Dunedin by F. W. Hutton. In 1883 Edward Meyrick, thinking he was describing a new species, named this species Eurydice cymosema. Meyrick synonymised that name in 1884. George Hudson discussed this species under the name Xanthorhoe falcata in his 1928 book The butterflies and moths of New Zealand. Hudson stated that Louis Beethoven Prout believed the holotype specimen to be a large dark form of the species Asaphodes rufescens. J. S. Dugdale agreed with Prout, pointing out in his 1988 publication, that the New Zealand Arthropod Collection holds specimens that have coloration ranging from dark, intermediate to light and as a result Dugdale synonymised Asaphodes rufescens with this species. The male holotype is held at the Natural History Museum, London.

== Description ==
Butler described the male holotype specimen as follows:

Allied to L. punctilineata (which it much resembles in colour and markings), but larger and with distinctly falcate primaries; primaries reddish-brown, with the base and a broad central belt dark brown traversed by blackish lines and margined by white dots; a black discocellular dot; external border blackish, diffused; two or three whitish subapical dots; secondaries silvery-grey with a darker waved central belt formed of parallel dark grey lines, dotted with black upon the abdominal margin, white bordered; a submarginal series of white-bordered grey spots; a marginal series of blackish dots in pairs; fringe pale reddish-brown; abdomen with dorsal pairs of black dashes on each segment; primaries below grey with darker white-bordered central belt; costa cream-coloured between the markings; a zigzag white-bordered subapical dusky stria; secondaries whitish with a broad irregular central belt formed by two blackish limiting lines and two grey intermediate lines; the outer black line distinctly undulated; a very ill-defined blackish speckled submarginal band; body below testaceous. Expanse of wings 1 inch 3 lines.

H. falcata is similar in appearance to its sister species H. megaspilata but is a slightly larger moth with its forewings having a less distinct hook shape. The depth of colour of the forewings of this moth can vary from specimen to specimen.

== Distribution ==
This species is endemic to New Zealand. It can be found in the southern parts of the South island and occurs with its similar in appearance sister species H. megaspilata from Dunedin southwards.

== Behaviour ==
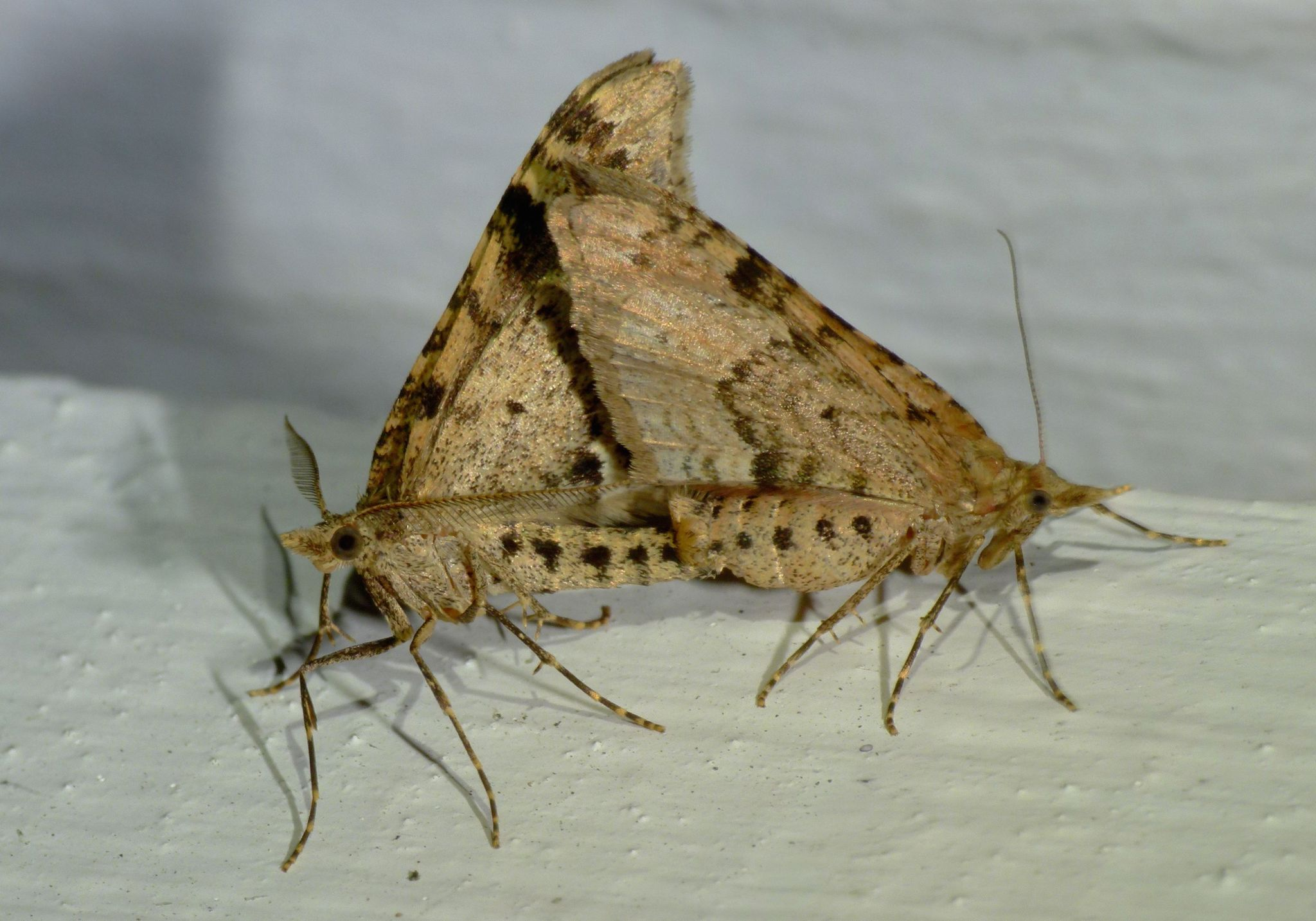
Homodotis falcata pair mating in October

The larvae of this species feed on leaf litter. Adults are on the wing most months of the year but more frequently from July to January.
