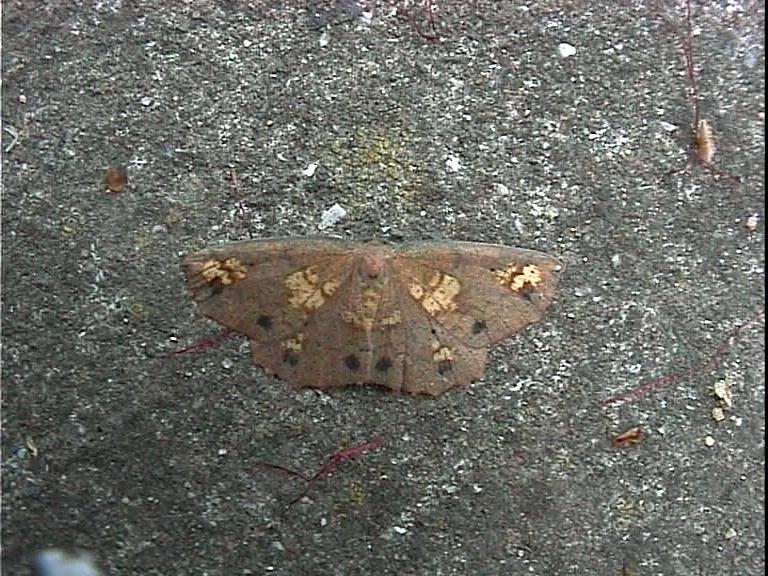
- Xyridacma ustaria, Mairangi Bay, Auckland, New Zealand

Scientific classification
- Kingdom: Animalia
- Phylum: Arthropoda
- Class: Insecta
- Order: Lepidoptera
- Family: Geometridae
- Subfamily: Oenochrominae
- Genus: Xyridacma; Meyrick, 1888

Synonyms
- Lyrcea Walker, 1860; Xynonia Prout, 1910

= Xyridacma =

Genus of moths

Xyridacma is a genus of moths in the family Geometridae erected by Edward Meyrick in 1888.

== Species ==
- Xyridacma alectoraria Walker, 1860
- Xyridacma ustaria Walker, [1863]
- Xyridacma veronicae Prout, 1934
