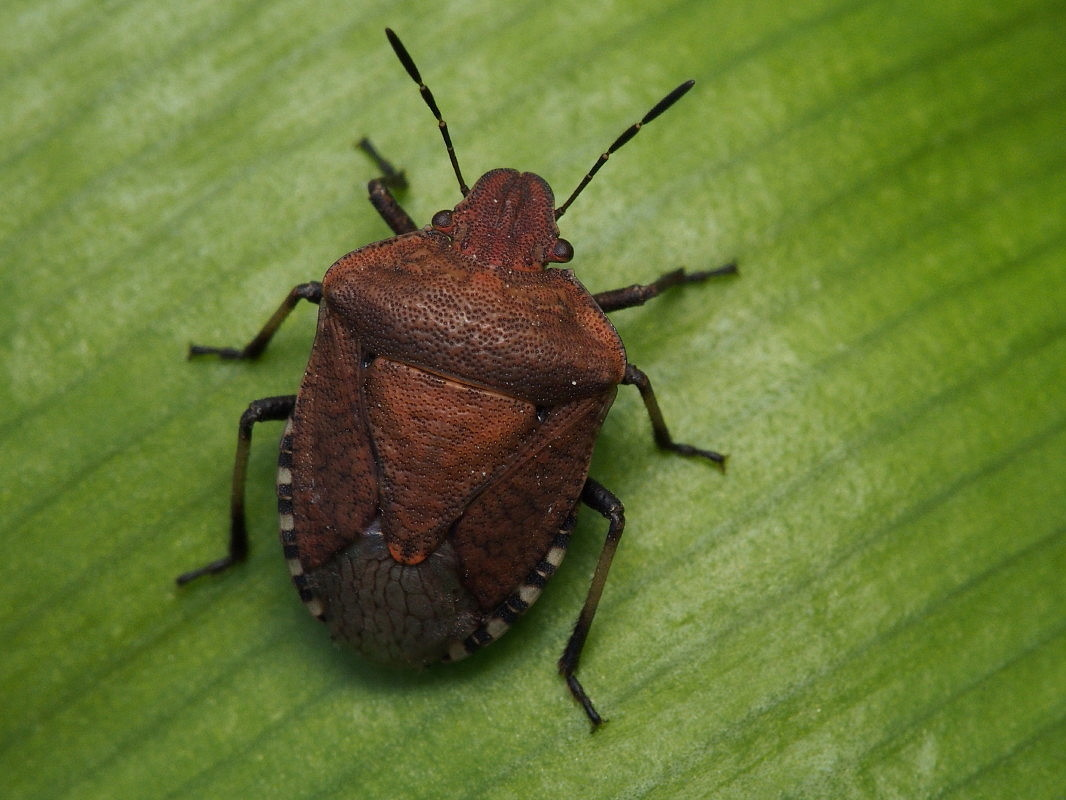

Scientific classification
- Domain: Eukaryota
- Kingdom: Animalia
- Phylum: Arthropoda
- Class: Insecta
- Order: Hemiptera
- Suborder: Heteroptera
- Infraorder: Pentatomomorpha
- Superfamily: Pentatomoidea
- Family: Pentatomidae
- Genus: Dictyotus
- Species: D. caenosus

Binomial name
- Dictyotus caenosus (Westwood, 1837)

Synonyms
- Pentatoma caenosus Westwood, 1837; Dictyotus bipunctatus Dallas, 1851; Dictyotus plebejus Stål, 1859; Pentatoma latifrons Walker, 1867; Pentatoma tibialis Walker, 1867; Pentatoma vilis Walker, 1867; Sciocoris polystictica Butler, 1874

= Dictyotus caenosus =

Species of true bug

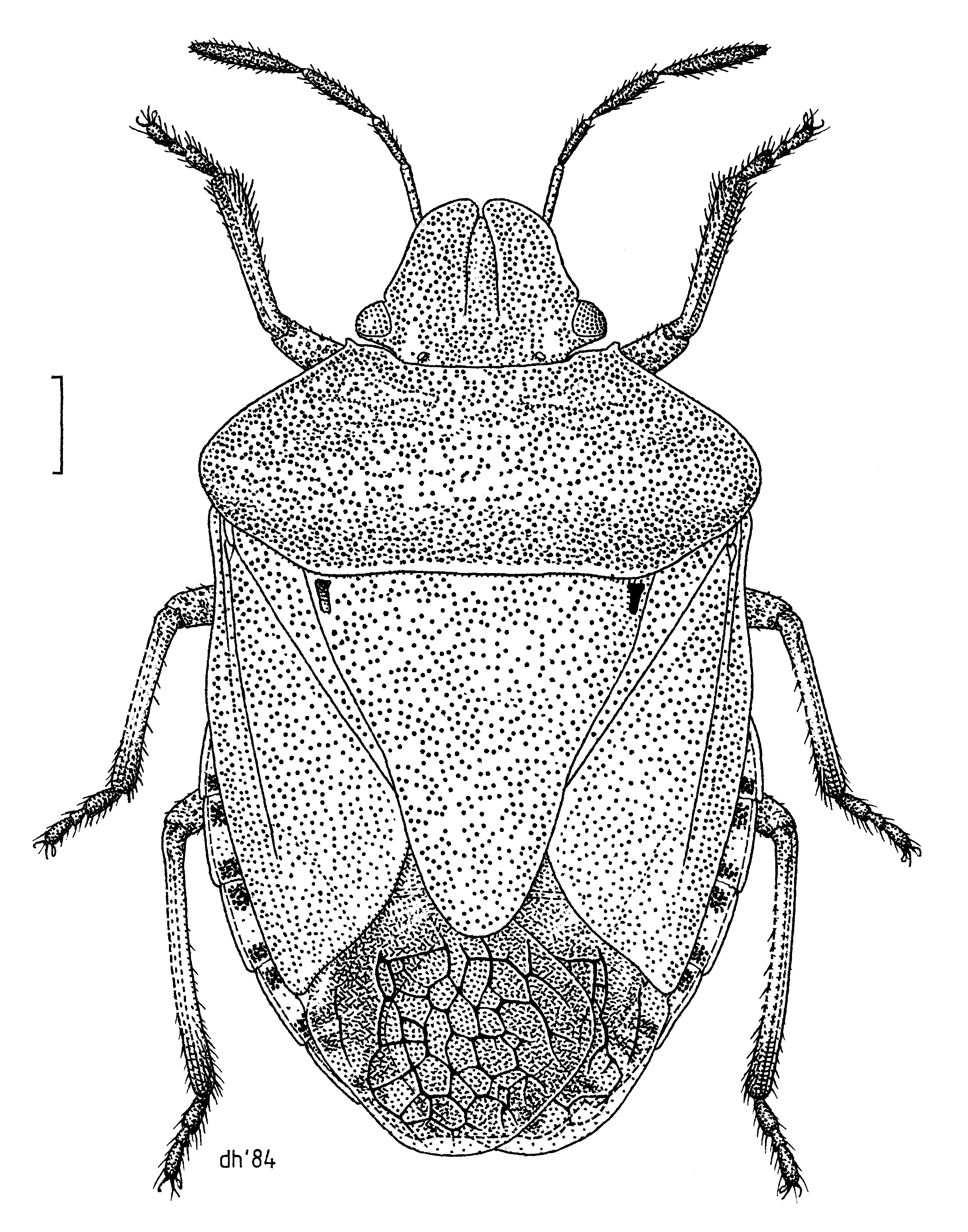
Illustrated by Des Helmore

Dictyotus caenosus, commonly known as the brown shield bug, is an Australian species of stink bug that has been introduced into New Zealand and New Caledonia.

== Description ==
Adults are between 8-10mm in length, predominantly brown, with a yellow connexivum interrupted by black bars (on the sides of the abdomen). Eggs are around 0.9mm in height and diameter, pale yellowish-green when first deposited, but which subsequently take on a lemon yellow colour, and finally pink closer to hatching.

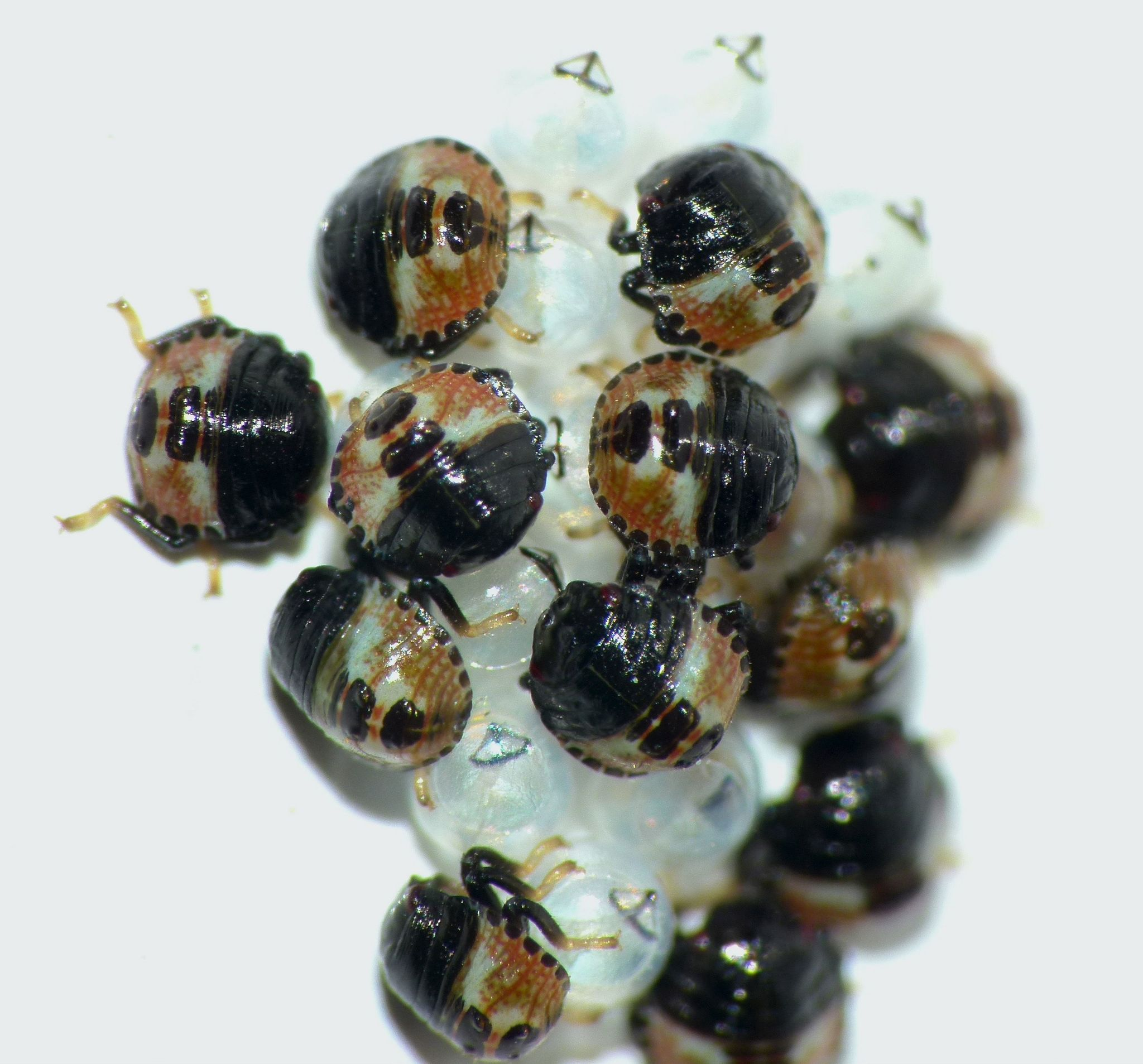
Dictyotus caenosus nymphs recently emerged from eggs.

== Life cycle ==
The life cycle of Dictyotus caenosus is similar to other Pentatomidae. Adults mate in spring and late summer and lay eggs in early summer. Clusters of around 18 eggs are laid on leaves or at the base of plants. Initially, eggs are a pale yellow colour, but as development progresses, the eggs eventually darken and show the eye spots and egg burster on the nymph. Nymphs all hatch from the eggs around the same time and remain near the egg mass until moulting to the second nymph stage or 'instar'. Moulting results in the nymph shedding its outer exoskeleton, which it leaves behind on its host plant. The nymphs progress through five instars before a final moult to adult. Adults are capable of flight, while nymphs are restricted to dispersing through walking. Adults are most abundant from January to March, and those surviving to the end of the season overwinter at the base of plants or under stones.

== Distribution ==
Brown shield bugs are native to Australia where they are widespread in grassy areas. They are considered adventive in New Zealand, where they are widespread and associated with wild grasses such as Plantago, and pasture crops such as lucerne. They are also present in New Caledonia.

== Ecology ==
In New Zealand, D. caenosus is often associated with herbaceous plants and grasses in a variety of different habitats. It is commonly found on roadsides, swamps, scrubland, on the edges of cultivated fields, and in paddocks. Host plants include Brassica rapa, Fragaria sp., Medicago sativa, Pisum sp., Rubus spp., Solanum aviculare, Trifolium repens, Zea mays, fodder beet, grapes, turnips, and potatoes. It is sometimes found in association with native plants such as Avicennia marina subsp. australasica, Carmichaelia sp., Olearia, Coprosma rhamnoides, Cordyline australis, Dacrydium cupressinum, Festuca novae-zelandiae, Hebe salicifolia, Muehlenbeckia sp., and Myoporum laetum. A number of natural enemies have been recorded using D. caenosus as a host, including the tachinid Cylindromyia bimacula (Walker) in Australia, and the platygastrid egg parasitoids Trissolcus basalis (Wollaston) and T. oenone (Dodd) in New Zealand.
