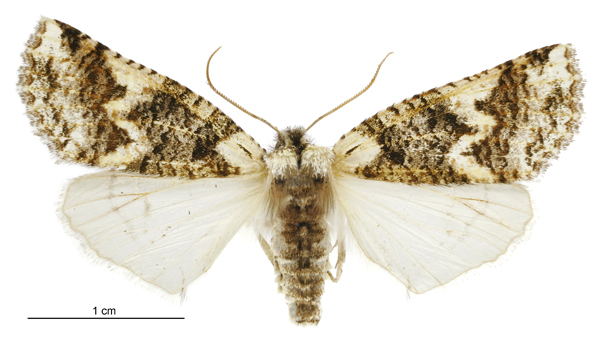
- Female
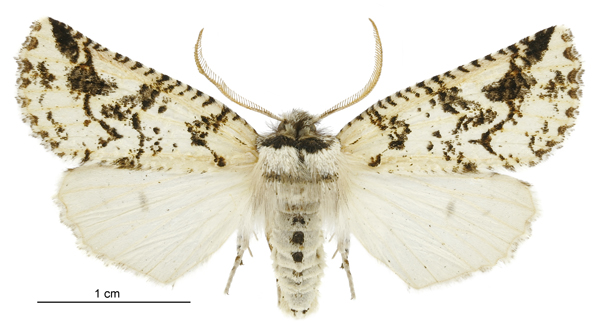
- Male

Scientific classification
- Kingdom: Animalia
- Phylum: Arthropoda
- Clade: Pancrustacea
- Class: Insecta
- Order: Lepidoptera
- Family: Geometridae
- Genus: Declana
- Species: D. nigrosparsa

Binomial name
- Declana nigrosparsa Butler, 1879

Synonyms
- Declana toreuta, Meyrick 1929

= Declana nigrosparsa =

Species of moth endemic to New Zealand

Declana nigrosparsa is a species of moth in the family Geometridae. This species was first described by Arthur Gardiner Butler in 1879. It is endemic to New Zealand. The female holotype collected by F. W. Hutton in Dunedin, is held at the Natural History Museum, London.
