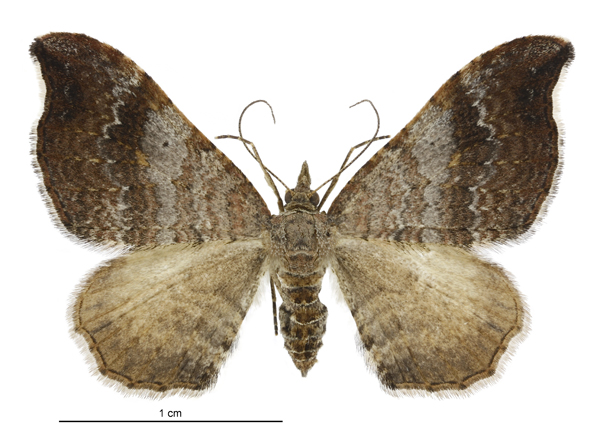
- Female
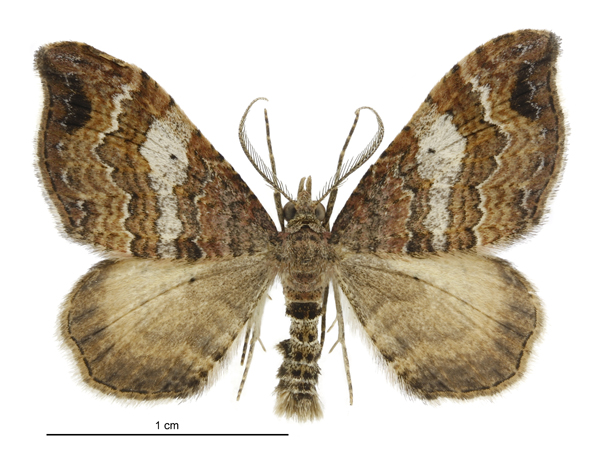
- Male

Scientific classification
- Kingdom: Animalia
- Phylum: Arthropoda
- Clade: Pancrustacea
- Class: Insecta
- Order: Lepidoptera
- Family: Geometridae
- Genus: Homodotis
- Species: H. megaspilata

Binomial name
- Homodotis megaspilata (Walker, 1862)

Synonyms
- Larentia megaspilata Walker, 1862; Cidaria assata Felder & Rogenhofer, 1875; Cidaria nehata Felder & Rogenhofer, 1875; Asaphodes megaspilata (Walker, 1862)

= Homodotis megaspilata =

Species of moth

Homodotis megaspilata, also known as the small hooked-tip looper moth, is a moth of the family Geometridae. It is endemic to New Zealand and can be found throughout the country. It is regarded as being common species. The preferred habitat of this species is native forest, scrub, coastal areas and domestic gardens. Larvae feed on the dead leaves of Geniostoma ligustrifolium and likely other native plants. Once mature the larvae will pupate on the ground forming a silken cocoon protected by hiding inside two leaves of its host plant. Adults are nocturnal and are on the wing from October to April. They are attracted to light. In appearance the adults of this species are extremely variable but can be distinguished from similar species as all variations have forewings with blunt hook shaped tips.

== Taxonomy ==
This species was first described by Francis Walker in 1862 under the name Larentia megaspilata using a specimen from T. R. Oxley's collection. It was also described by Baron Cajetan von Felder, Rudolf Felder and Alois Friedrich Rogenhofer in 1875 as Cidaria assata and Cidaria nehata. These later names were synonymised by Edward Meyrick in 1883, and the species was described in more detail in 1884. George Hudson discussed and illustrated this species under the name Asaphodes megasplitata in both his 1898 and his 1928 books on Lepidoptera. Hudson was following Meyrick's decision to extend this genus to apply to all species with bipectinate male antennae and with undivided areole on the forewing areole. In 1971 Dugdale, after undertaking a study of the genitalia of moths contained in the genus Asaphodes, reinstated the genus Homodoits and placed this species within it. This placement was confirmed by Dugdale in 1988. The holotype specimen, collected in Nelson by T. R. Oxley, is held at the Natural History Museum, London.

== Description ==
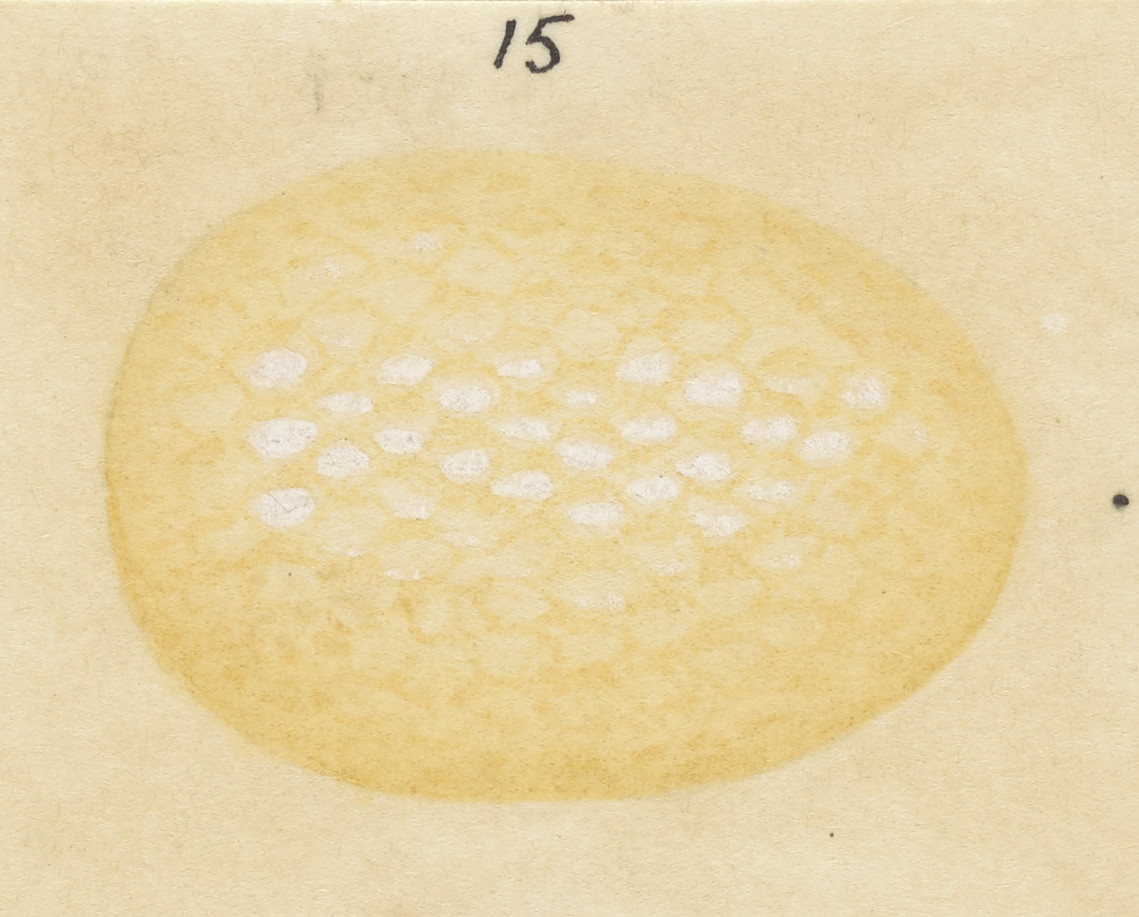
Egg of H. megasplitata.

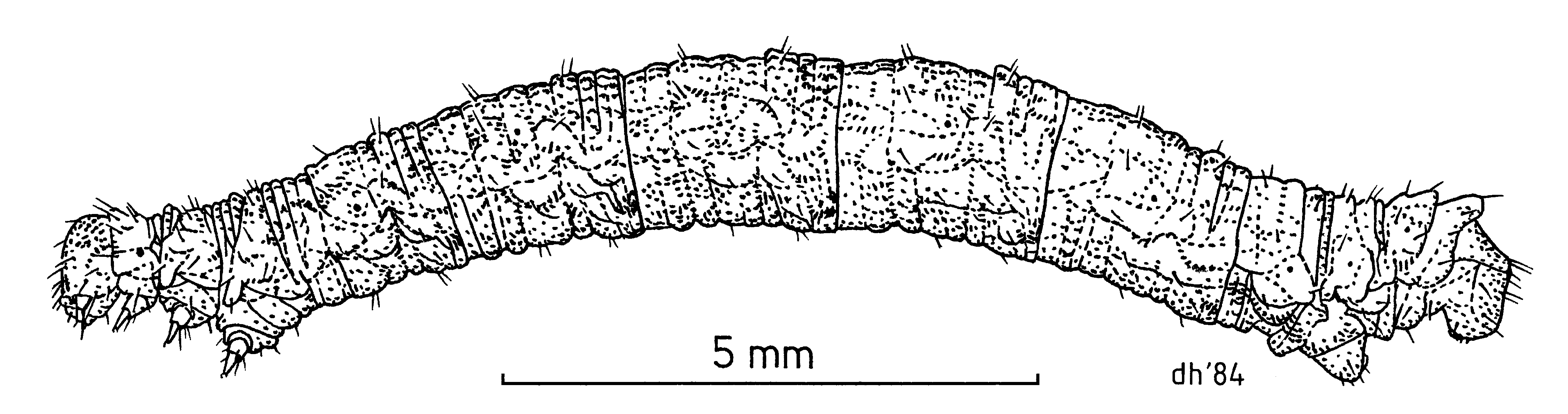
H. megaspilata larva.

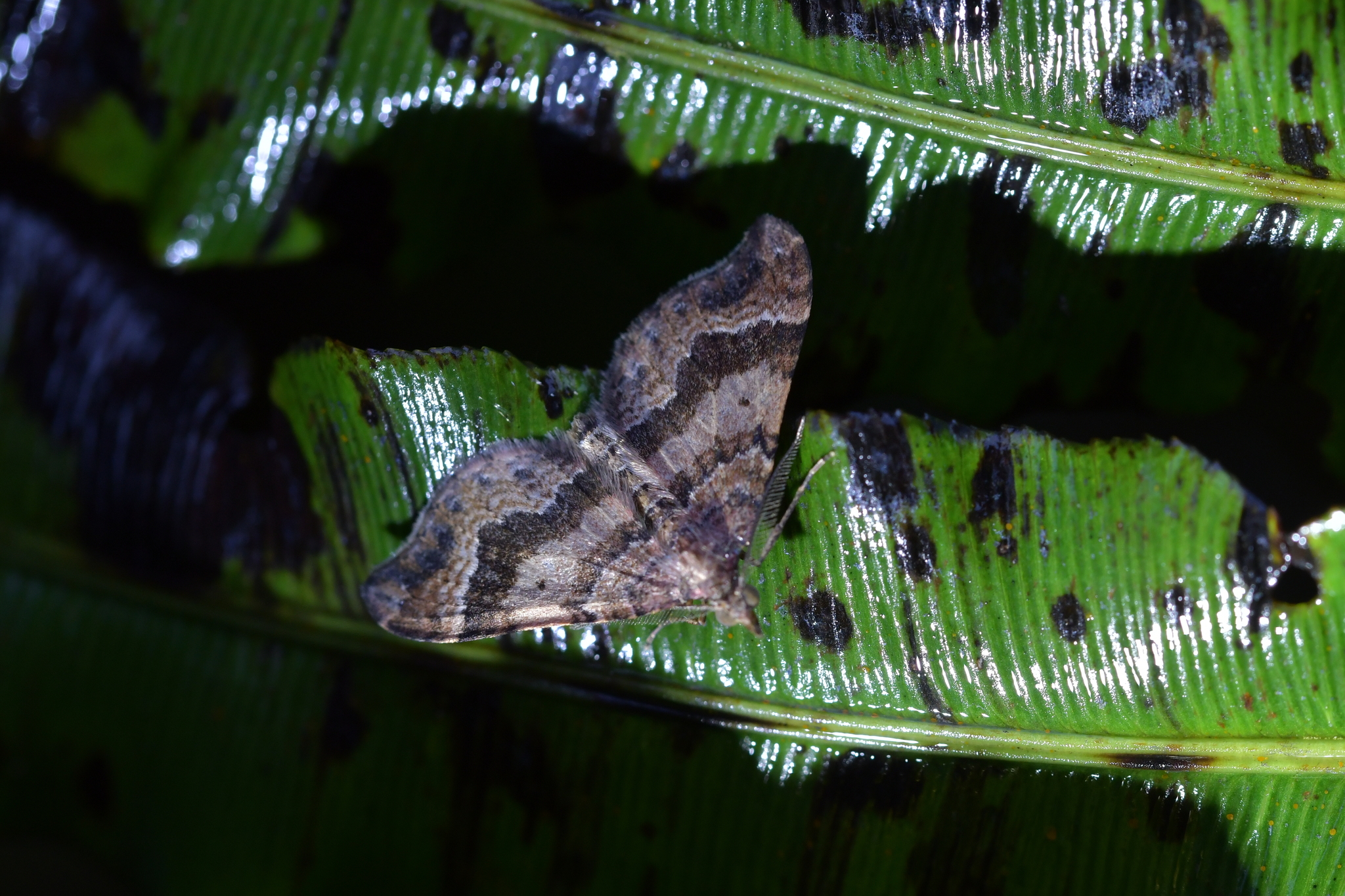
Live H. megaspilata.

Hudson described the adults of this species in 1898 as follows:

The expansion of the wings is about 1 inch. The fore-wings are dull ochreous; there is a series of fine brown and reddish wavy transverse lines near the base, forming a rather broad basal band; then a pale central area containing a blackish dot above the middle; next, a very distinct band made up of several fine wavy grey lines, with a rounded projection near the middle; this is followed by numerous pale brown curved marks forming more or less broken transverse lines; there is always an oblique slaty patch below the apex, and a series of minute dots on the termen. The hind-wings are ochreous brown, slightly darker towards the base, with numerous indistinct wavy brown lines. The apex of the fore-wing is very pointed and slightly hooked downwards; the termen is bowed near the middle. The female is much duller and more uniform in colour than the male, and the antennae are simple.

This species is extremely variable in appearance. Some male specimens have several more or less distinct white markings on the middle of the fore-wings; the transverse bands also differ considerably in both size and intensity. The females are not so variable; but in some specimens the bands on the fore-wings are almost absent, whilst others have the forewings rich brown, with a very conspicuous dark central band. The adults of this species can be distinguished from other species of a similar appearance as it has forewings with blunt hook shaped tips.

This species might possibly be confused with Homodotis falcata, as their range overlaps from Dunedin south. However this latter species is a larger moth but with less strongly hooked forewings.

== Distribution ==
Homodotis megaspilata is endemic to New Zealand and is very common throughout the country.

== Habitat and hosts ==
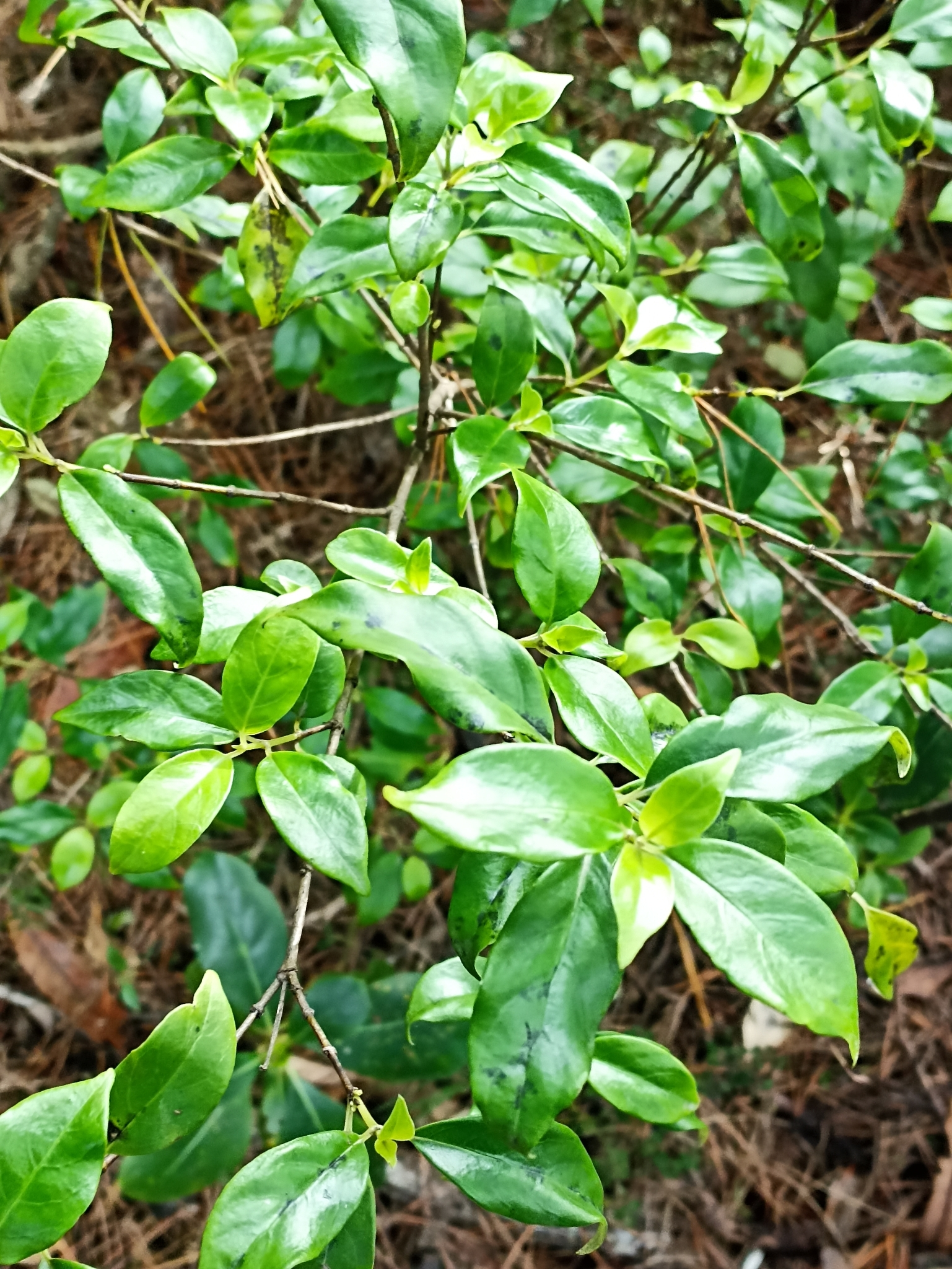
Larval host Geniostoma ligustrifolium.

This species inhabits native forest as well as scrub, coastal areas and domestic gardens. The larvae of this species feed on the dead leaves and has been recorded feeding on the leaf litter of Geniostoma ligustrifolium. The adult moths have been documented as pollinating Olearia virgata and Leptospermum scoparium. Adults have also been observed visiting the flowers of Meticytus ramiflorus.

== Life cycle and behaviour ==
The eggs are pale yellow when first laid. They turn dark reddish-brown for some days before the young larva emerges. The young larva is rather stout, dark brownish-black with numerous fine parallel ochreous lines the whole body is covered with rather long bristles. It is said to resemble "the fruiting body of a minute knobbed fungus". The larvae of this species are known to be predated upon by mice as well as by Cermatulus nasalis nasalis. H. megasilata pupates on the ground inside cocoon hidden in a dead leaf. This species probably hibernates in the imago state during the winter months. Adults are on the wing from October until April. Adults are nocturnal, flying during the evening from dusk. They are attracted to light.
