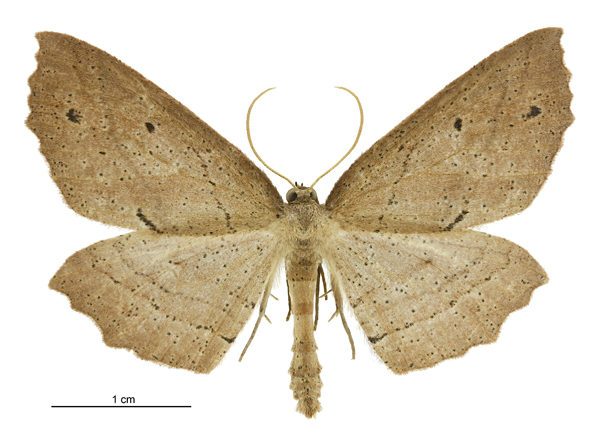
- Male
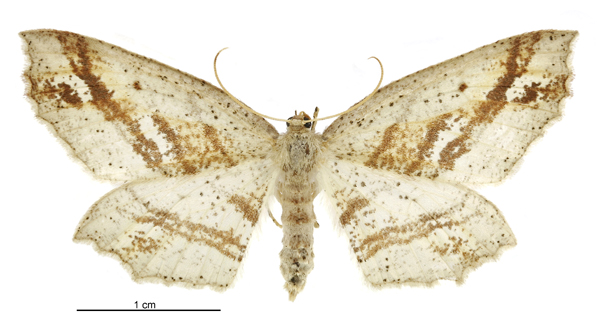
- Female

Scientific classification
- Kingdom: Animalia
- Phylum: Arthropoda
- Clade: Pancrustacea
- Class: Insecta
- Order: Lepidoptera
- Family: Geometridae
- Genus: Xyridacma
- Species: X. veronicae

Binomial name
- Xyridacma veronicae Prout, 1934

Synonyms
- Epirrhanthis hemipteraria Meyrick, 1888

= Xyridacma veronicae =

Species of moth

Xyridacma veronicae, also known as the striped veronica moth, is a moth of the family Geometridae. It was described in 1934 by Louis Beethoven Prout. It is endemic to New Zealand.

== Taxonomy ==
This species was described by Louis Beethoven Pout as a replacement name for Xyridacma hemipteraria as discussed by Edward Meyrick in 1888.

== Behaviour ==
Adults are attracted to light and have been collected via a mercury vapour light trap.
