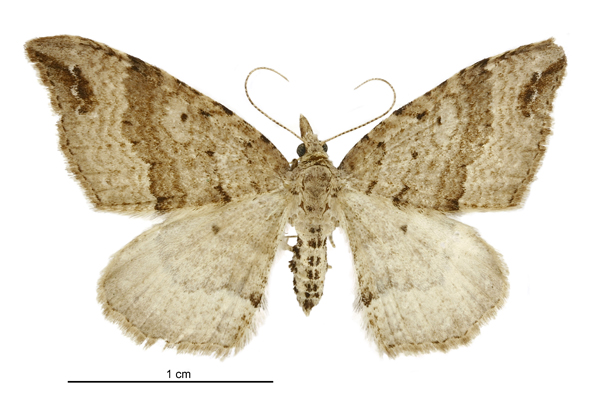
- Female H. falcata

Scientific classification
- Kingdom: Animalia
- Phylum: Arthropoda
- Clade: Pancrustacea
- Class: Insecta
- Order: Lepidoptera
- Family: Geometridae
- Subfamily: Larentiinae
- Genus: Homodotis; Meyrick, 1885

Synonyms
- Harpalyce Meyrick, 1883; Probolaea Meyrick, 1885; Eurydice Meyrick, 1883

= Homodotis =

Genus of moths

Homodotis is a genus of moths in the family Geometridae erected by Edward Meyrick in 1885. All the species in this genus are endemic to New Zealand.

== Taxonomy ==
This genus was erected by Edward Meyrick in 1885 as a replacement name for Eurydice Meyrick as that name was preoccupied by the Crustacea genus Eurydice Leach, 1815. The type species is Eurydice cymosema (now known as H. falcata) by monotypy.

== Species ==
Species found in this genus include:

- Homodotis amblyterma (Meyrick, 1931)
- Homodotis falcata (Butler, 1879)
- Homodotis megaspilata (Walker, 1862)
