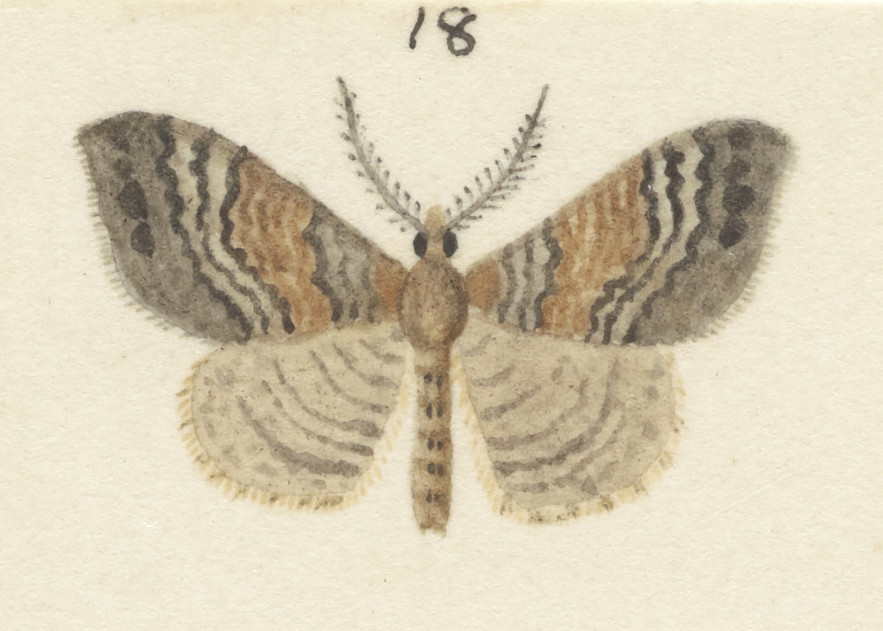
- Illustration of male

Scientific classification
- Kingdom: Animalia
- Phylum: Arthropoda
- Class: Insecta
- Order: Lepidoptera
- Family: Geometridae
- Genus: Homodotis
- Species: H. amblyterma

Binomial name
- Homodotis amblyterma (Meyrick, 1931)

Synonyms
- Asaphodes amblyterma Meyrick, 1931

= Homodotis amblyterma =

Species of moth endemic to New Zealand

Homodotis amblyterma is a moth of the family Geometridae. This species was first described by Edward Meyrick in 1931. It is endemic to New Zealand and has been observed in Northland. Adults are on the wing in December.

== Taxonomy ==
This species was first described by Edward Meyrick in 1931 using a specimen collected in Whangārei in December by Commander S. C. Patterson and named Asaphodes amblyterma. George Hudson also used this name when he discussed and illustrated this species in his 1939 book A supplement to the butterflies and moths of New Zealand. J. S. Dugdale placed this species in the genus Homodotis in 1988. The female holotype, which is labeled as a male, is held at the Natural History Museum, London.

== Description ==
Meyrick described this species as follows:

♂ 24 mm. Head, palpi thorax grey irrorated whitish. Antennal pectinations 6. Forewings triangular, apex somewhat prominentrounded, termen little oblique, somewhat sinuate above, rounded beneath; grey; costal edge ochreous-whitish spotted dark grey; median band broad, with faint ochreous tinge, preceded by a slightly curved fascia of 3 or 4 dark fuscous striae separated by light grey, and limited posteriorly by 3 dark fuscous striae separated by whitish lines becoming white in disc above middle, rather prominentcurved in middle, beyond these a thick dark fuscous shade on costal half of wing: cilia grey, outer half whitish in sinuation. Hindwings light grey; a faint darker curved postmedian line; cilia light grey, outer half whitish-tinged.

== Distribution ==
This species is endemic to New Zealand. It has been observed in Northland.

== Behaviour ==
Adults are on the wing in December.
