= Declana lupa =

Scientific classification
- Kingdom: Animalia
- Phylum: Arthropoda
- Class: Insecta
- Order: Lepidoptera
- Family: Geometridae
- Genus: Declana
- Species: D. lupa

Binomial name
- Declana lupa Dugdale and Emmerson, 2023

Species of moth endemic to New Zealand

Declana lupa is a moth of the family Geometridae. It is endemic to New Zealand.
