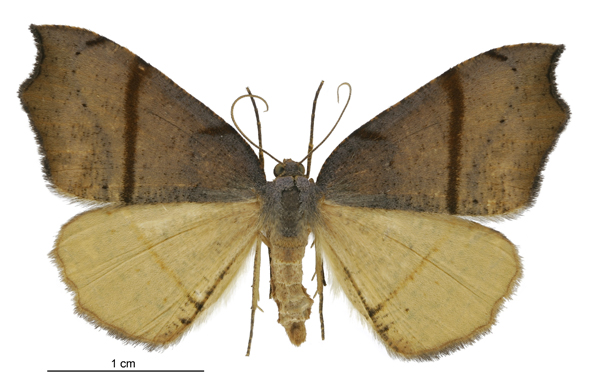
- Female
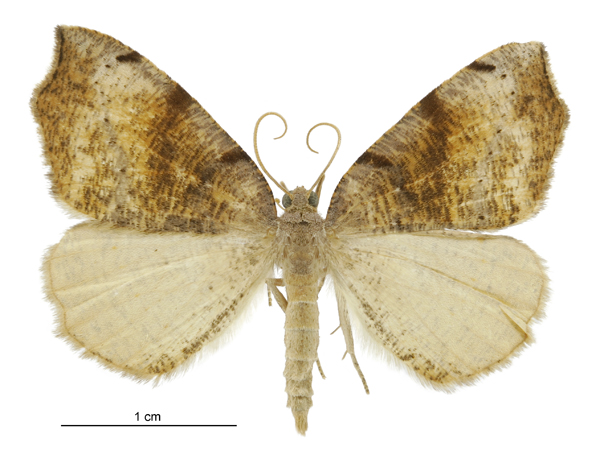
- Male

Scientific classification
- Kingdom: Animalia
- Phylum: Arthropoda
- Class: Insecta
- Order: Lepidoptera
- Family: Geometridae
- Genus: Sestra
- Species: S. flexata

Binomial name
- Sestra flexata (Walker, 1862)

Synonyms
- Cidaria flexata Walker, 1862

= Sestra flexata =

Species of moth endemic to New Zealand

Sestra flexata, also known as the common fern looper, is a species of moth in the family Geometridae. This species is endemic to New Zealand.

== Taxonomy ==
S. flexata was first described by Francis Walker in 1862 using specimens collected either in Auckland by D. Bolton. Walker originally named the species Cidaria flexata. George Hudson discussed and illustrated this species in his 1928 book The butterflies and moths of New Zealand. The male holotype is held at the Natural History Museum, London.

== Description ==
The pale yellow egg is cylindrical in shape. The larva of this species is coloured dark brown and is 25 to 30 mm long when mature. The larvae are approximately 1 to 1 1/4 inch long and is a brownish greenish colour with yellow tones underneath. Down its back is a brown line with two more lines down its sides. It also has a few black markings and a number of short bristles.

Walker described the adult of this species as follows:

Female. Cinereous fawn-colour, ochraceous beneath. Palpi slender, very short, obliquely ascending. Abdomen yellowish. Forewings acute, subfalcate, with a blackish shade on nearly half the middle space and along the exterior border, which is distinctly angular. Hind wings yellowish, without markings; fore part of the exterior border slightly truncated. Length of the body 6 lines; of the wings 16 lines.

Hudson described the adults of this species as follows:

The expansion of the wings is from 1 1/4 to 1 3/8 inches. The fore-wings are pale plum-colour; there is an indistinct, curved, brownish transverse line near the base; a straight dark brown line across the middle, and a curved series of brownish dots beyond the middle; the apex is pointed, and the termen has a strong projection a little above the middle. The hind-wings are ochreous, with a series of minute brownish dots across the middle.

== Distribution ==
This species is endemic to New Zealand. This species is found throughout New Zealand including the North, South, Stewart and Chatham Islands.

== Host species ==
The larval hosts of this species are Pteris macilenta and Histiopteris incisa. It has been collected by beating the latter fern.

== Behaviour ==
The older larvae of this species feed at night. When disturbed the larva will drop to the ground. Adults of this species pollinate Leptospermum scoparium. The adult moths are nocturnal, are attracted to light and on the wing from September until March.
