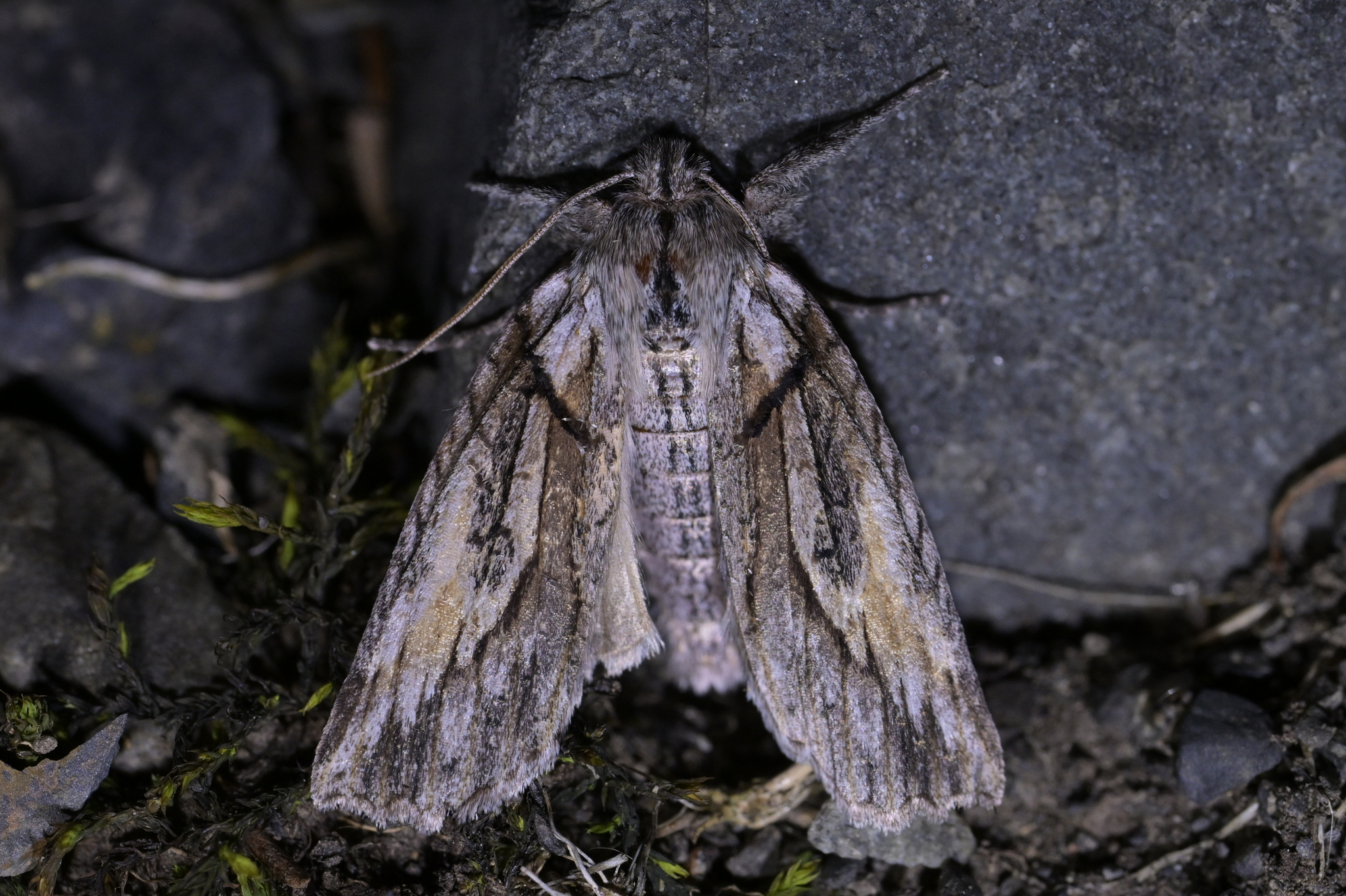

Scientific classification
- Kingdom: Animalia
- Phylum: Arthropoda
- Class: Insecta
- Order: Lepidoptera
- Family: Geometridae
- Genus: Declana
- Species: D. foxii

Binomial name
- Declana foxii Dugdale and Emmerson, 2023

= Declana foxii =

Species of moth endemic to New Zealand

Declana foxii is a species of moth in the family Geometridae. It is endemic to New Zealand.
