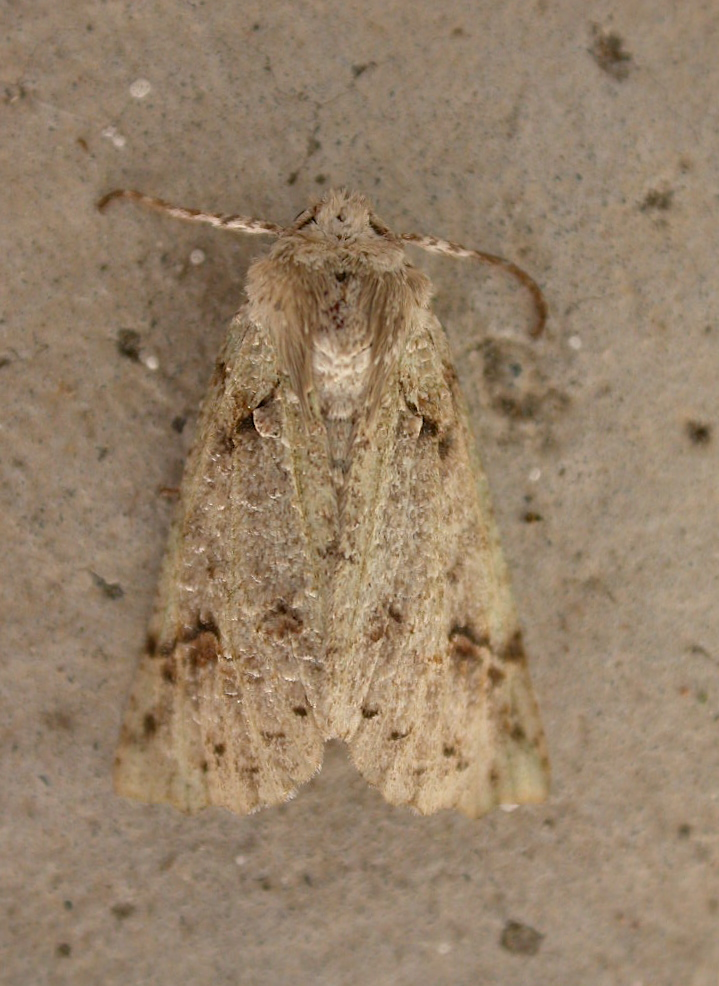
- Declana floccosa

Scientific classification
- Kingdom: Animalia
- Phylum: Arthropoda
- Class: Insecta
- Order: Lepidoptera
- Family: Geometridae
- Subfamily: Ennominae
- Genus: Declana; Walker, 1858

Synonyms
- Argua Walker, 1863; Epicasis Meyrick, 1885; Atossa Meyrick, 1884; Anatossa Warren, 1894

= Declana =

Genus of insects

Declana is a genus of moths in the family Geometridae that is endemic to New Zealand. The genus was erected by Francis Walker in 1858. In 2023, several members of the genus were moved to Ipana, a reinstated genus also originally described by Walker.

== Species ==
Species found in this genus include:

- Declana floccosa Walker, 1858 – forest semilooper
- Declana foxii Dugdale & Emmerson, 2023
- Declana lupa Dugdale & Emmerson, 2023
- Declana nigrosparsa Butler, 1879
- Declana niveata Butler, 1879
