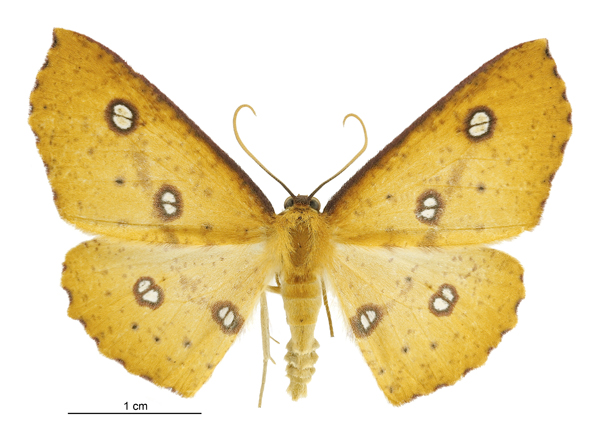
- Male
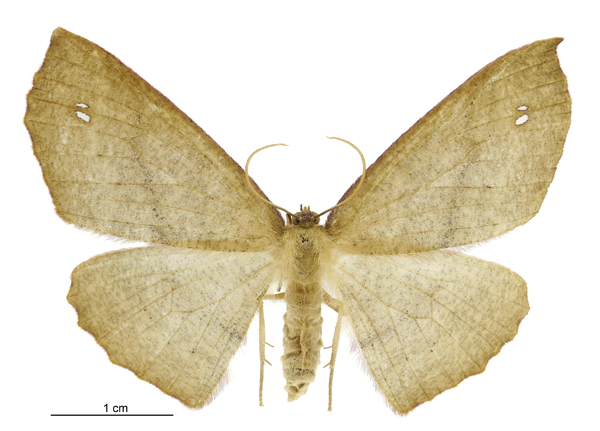
- Female

Scientific classification
- Kingdom: Animalia
- Phylum: Arthropoda
- Class: Insecta
- Order: Lepidoptera
- Family: Geometridae
- Genus: Xyridacma
- Species: X. alectoraria

Binomial name
- Xyridacma alectoraria (Walker, 1860)

Synonyms
- Lyrcea alectoraria Walker, 1860; Epirranthis alectoraria (Walker, 1860); Epirranthis alectoraria octomaculata Thierry-Mieg., 1915

= Xyridacma alectoraria =

Species of moth

Xyridacma alectoraria is a moth of the family Geometridae. It was described by Francis Walker in 1860 using a specimen collected in Auckland. It is endemic to New Zealand. This species is regarded as being rarely observed.
