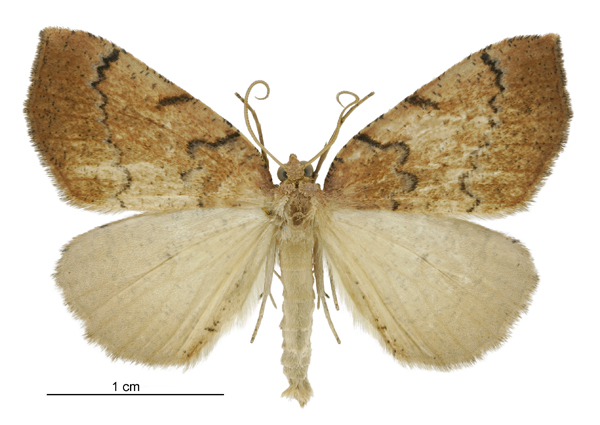
- Male
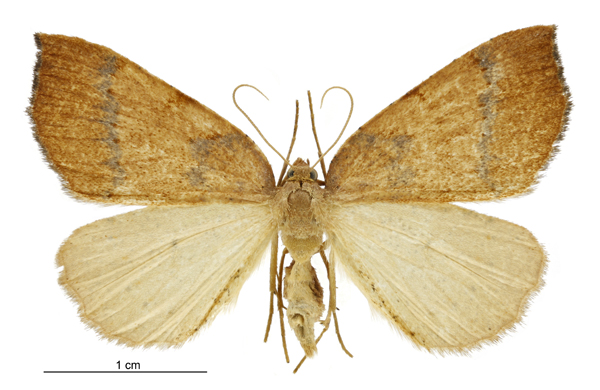
- Female

Scientific classification
- Kingdom: Animalia
- Phylum: Arthropoda
- Clade: Pancrustacea
- Class: Insecta
- Order: Lepidoptera
- Family: Geometridae
- Genus: Sestra
- Species: S. humeraria

Binomial name
- Sestra humeraria (Walker, 1861)

Synonyms
- Macaria humeraria Walker, 1861

= Sestra humeraria =

Species of moth

Sestra humeraria, also known as huarau looper, is a species of moth in the family Geometridae. It was described by Francis Walker in 1861. This species is endemic to New Zealand.

== Description ==
The mature larva of this species has a slightly knobbly appearance with a pale brown body marked with darker wavy lines. It is between 25 and 30 mm in length.

== Behaviour ==
When the larvae are touched they drop down to the soil or leaf litter. The larvae can be seen all year but the adult moths are on the wing from October to December.

== Host ==
The larval host of this species is the fern Hypolepis millefolium. The larvae feed on the fronds of their host.
