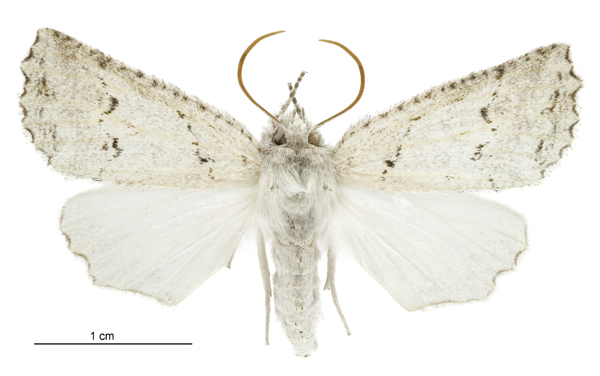
- Male
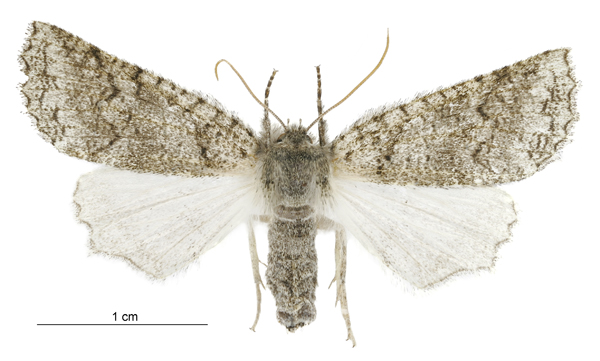
- Female

Scientific classification
- Kingdom: Animalia
- Phylum: Arthropoda
- Clade: Pancrustacea
- Class: Insecta
- Order: Lepidoptera
- Family: Geometridae
- Genus: Declana
- Species: D. niveata

Binomial name
- Declana niveata Butler, 1879

= Declana niveata =

Species of moth

Declana niveata is a species of moth in the family Geometridae. It is endemic to New Zealand. This species was first described by Arthur Gardiner Butler in 1879. The larvae of this species feed on Hoheria species. Adults are attracted to light and have been collected via a mercury vapour light trap.
