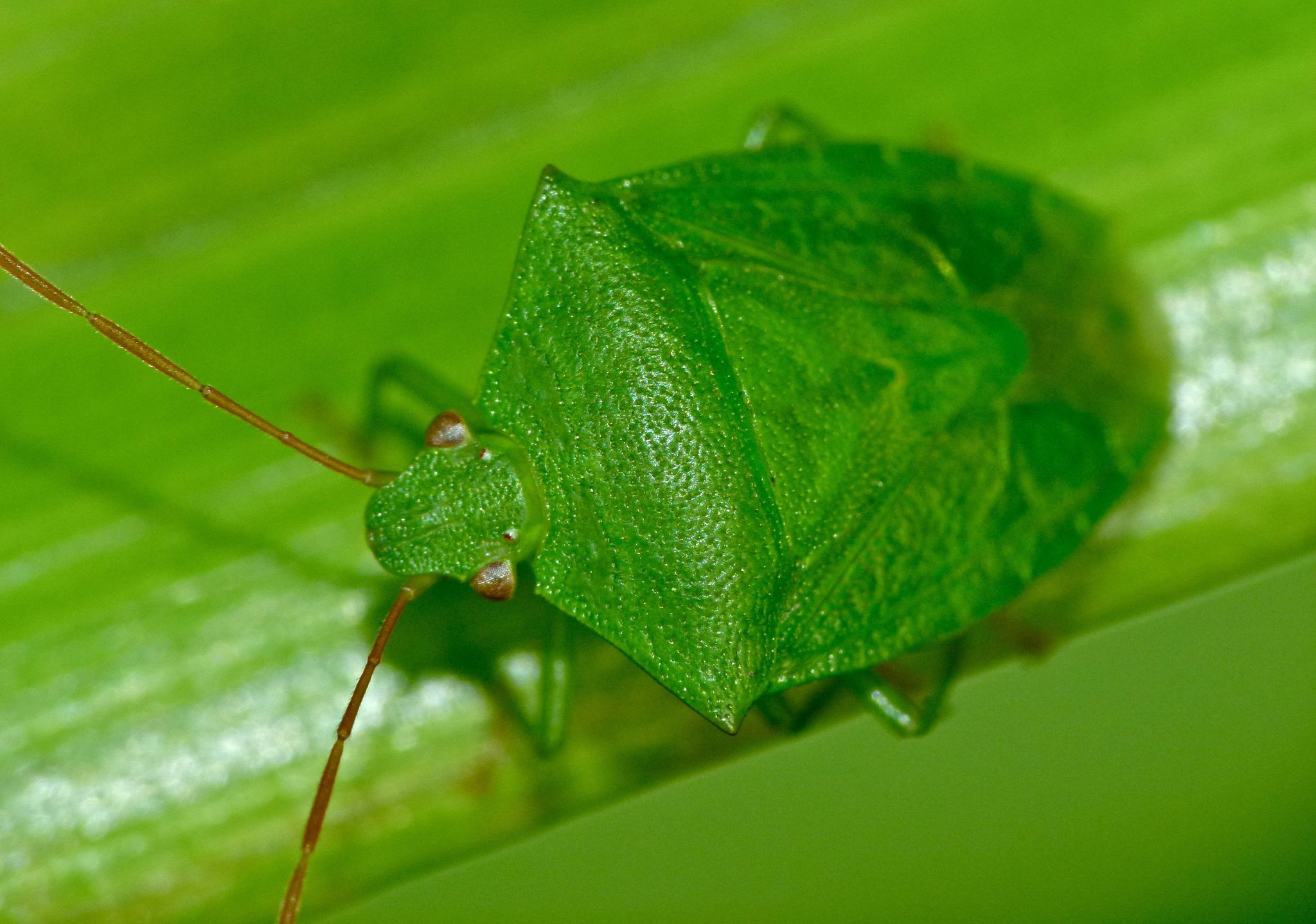

Scientific classification
- Kingdom: Animalia
- Phylum: Arthropoda
- Class: Insecta
- Order: Hemiptera
- Suborder: Heteroptera
- Family: Pentatomidae
- Genus: Cuspicona
- Species: C. simplex

Binomial name
- Cuspicona simplex Walker, 1867

Synonyms
- Cuspicona virescens Tryon, 1889

= Cuspicona simplex =

Species of true bug

Cuspicona simplex, commonly known as the green potato bug, is a herbivorous species of stink bug native to Australia and introduced to New Zealand. It feeds on nightshades. It is primarily known as a pest of potatoes, tomatoes, and other crops in the nightshade family.

== Description ==
Adults are bright green, range in length from 8.25 to 10.4 mm (0.325 to 0.409 in), and have pointed humeri (shoulders). The first and second instar nymphs are much smaller, primarily black and white, with some patches of red or brown. Later nymph stages are pale green with black patches on the abdomen.

== Life cycle ==
Adults usually lay 14 eggs together in a mass on the undersides of leaves. Bugs emerge and stay near the egg mass until shedding their skins. Similar to other pentatomids, Cuspicona simplex progresses through five juvenile stages called nymphs, and finally to adult. Adults overwinter on the base of plants or in loose soil until late spring, when they aggregate to mate and lay eggs. The total development time from egg to adult depends on temperature, but takes between 28 and 30 days at a constant temperature of 21 °C (70 °F).

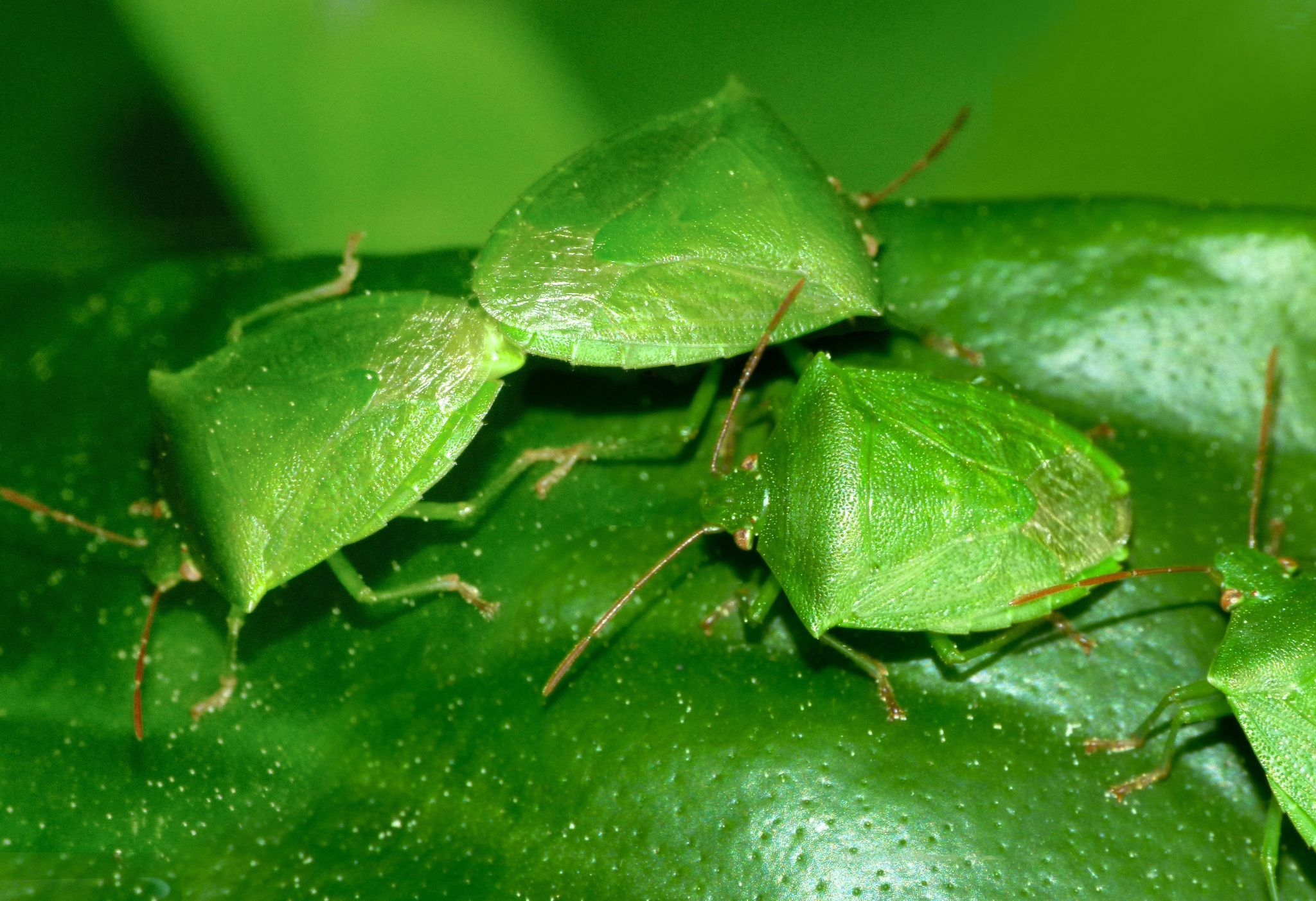
A pair of C. simplex mating.

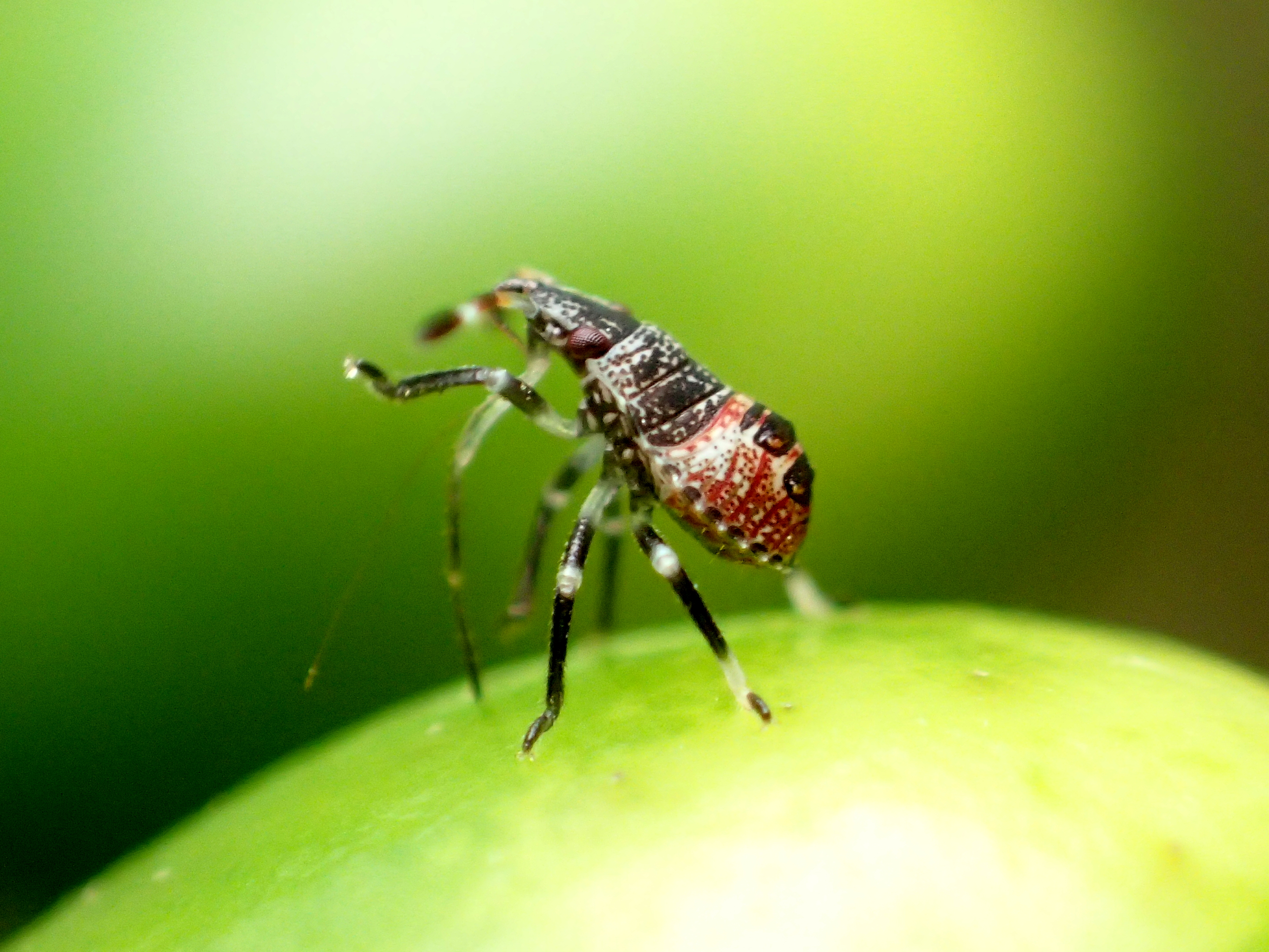
Nymph feeding on poroporo (Solanum lanciatum).

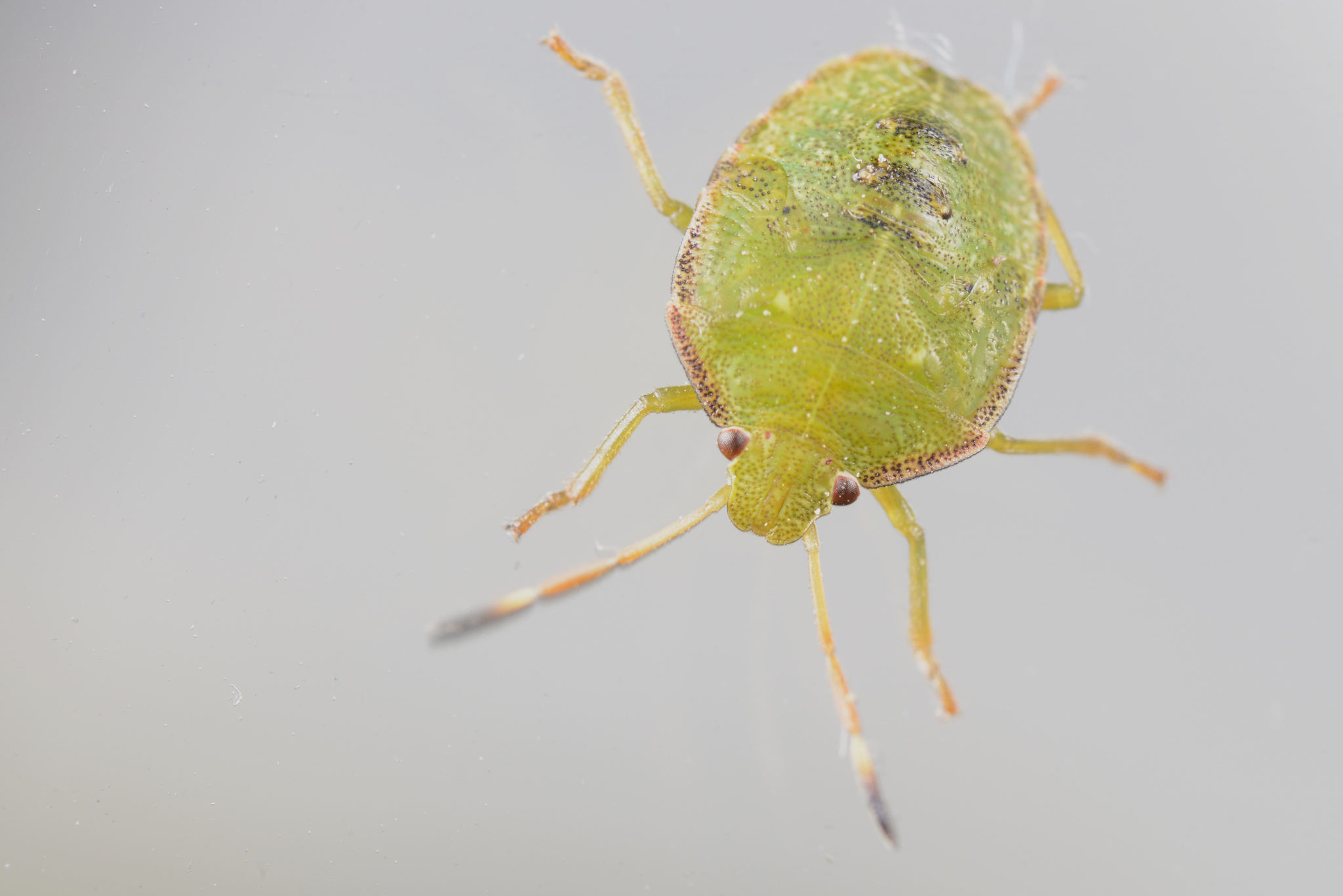
A later juvenile stage (nymph) of Cuspicona simplex.

== Ecology ==
Cuspicona simplex is usually found in association with plants from the nightshade family, and in particular, plants within the genus Solanum. It has also been recorded feeding on raspberry. Similar to other herbivorous stink bugs, C. simplex feed on their plant hosts by piercing fruits or stems with their stylets, injecting saliva, and sucking fluids out of the plant. Cuspicona simplex eggs are attacked by at least three species of egg parasitoids. The first, Trissolcus basalis, is a biocontrol agent introduced in Australia and New Zealand against green vegetable bug (Nezara viridula). Eggs parasitised by this species are uniformly black. The second, Trissolcus oenone, is native to both Australia and New Zealand, but little is known about its biology. Eggs parasitised by this species have a distinctive black ring only at the top of the egg. The third, an undescribed species of Acroclisoides, may attack C. simplex eggs directly as a primary parasitoid, or it may be attacking eggs previously parasitised by one of the first two parasitoid species (in which case it would be a hyperparasitoid). A species of braconid wasp, Aridelus sp., has been recorded from fifth instar nymphs, and a species of tachinid fly, Alophora sp., has been recorded from adult C. simplex.
