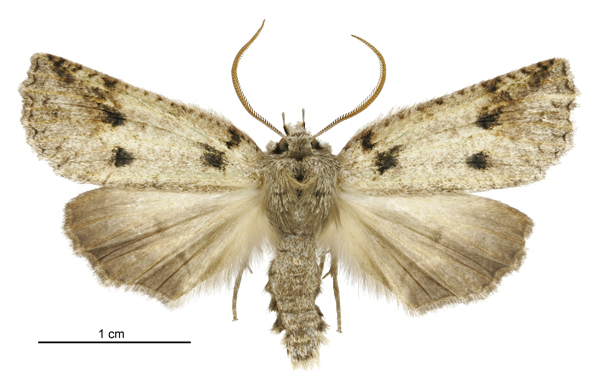
- Male specimen
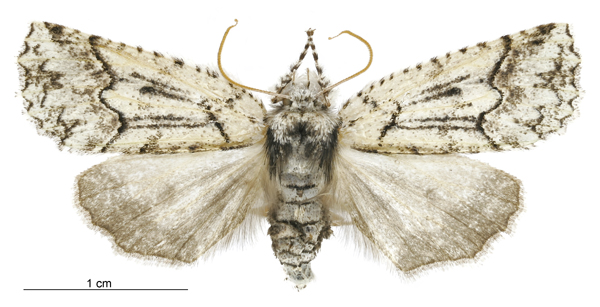
- Female specimen

Scientific classification
- Kingdom: Animalia
- Phylum: Arthropoda
- Clade: Pancrustacea
- Class: Insecta
- Order: Lepidoptera
- Family: Geometridae
- Genus: Declana
- Species: D. floccosa

Binomial name
- Declana floccosa Walker, 1858

Synonyms
- Declana scabra Walker, 1863; Declana nigrosparsa Butler, 1879; Declana callista Salmon, 1946

= Declana floccosa =

Species of moth

Declana floccosa, the forest semilooper or manuka moth is a moth of the family Geometridae. It is endemic to New Zealand. It was first described by Francis Walker in 1863 using specimens obtained from Colonel Bolton.

The wingspan of this species is 27–35 mm and is extremely variable in colour and patterning.

The larvae feed on a wide range of native and exotic broad-leaved and coniferous shrubs and trees. Exotic hosts include Pinus radiata and other Pinus species, Pseudotsuga menziesii, Larix and Eucalyptus. Native hosts include Muehlenbeckia australis.

Adults are attracted to light and have been collected via a mercury vapour light trap.

== Population decline and recovery ==
A longitudinal study from 1974 to 2016 indicated the population of this moth declined sharply in the study area in the mid-1980s but began to recover in the late 1990s. It has been hypothesised that the arrival of Vespula vulgaris in New Zealand might be the cause of the population decline. It was also hypothesised that the recovery in population may have been brought about as a result of the extended emergence period of this moth which gave those moths emerging later in the season the ability to avoid predation by wasps.
