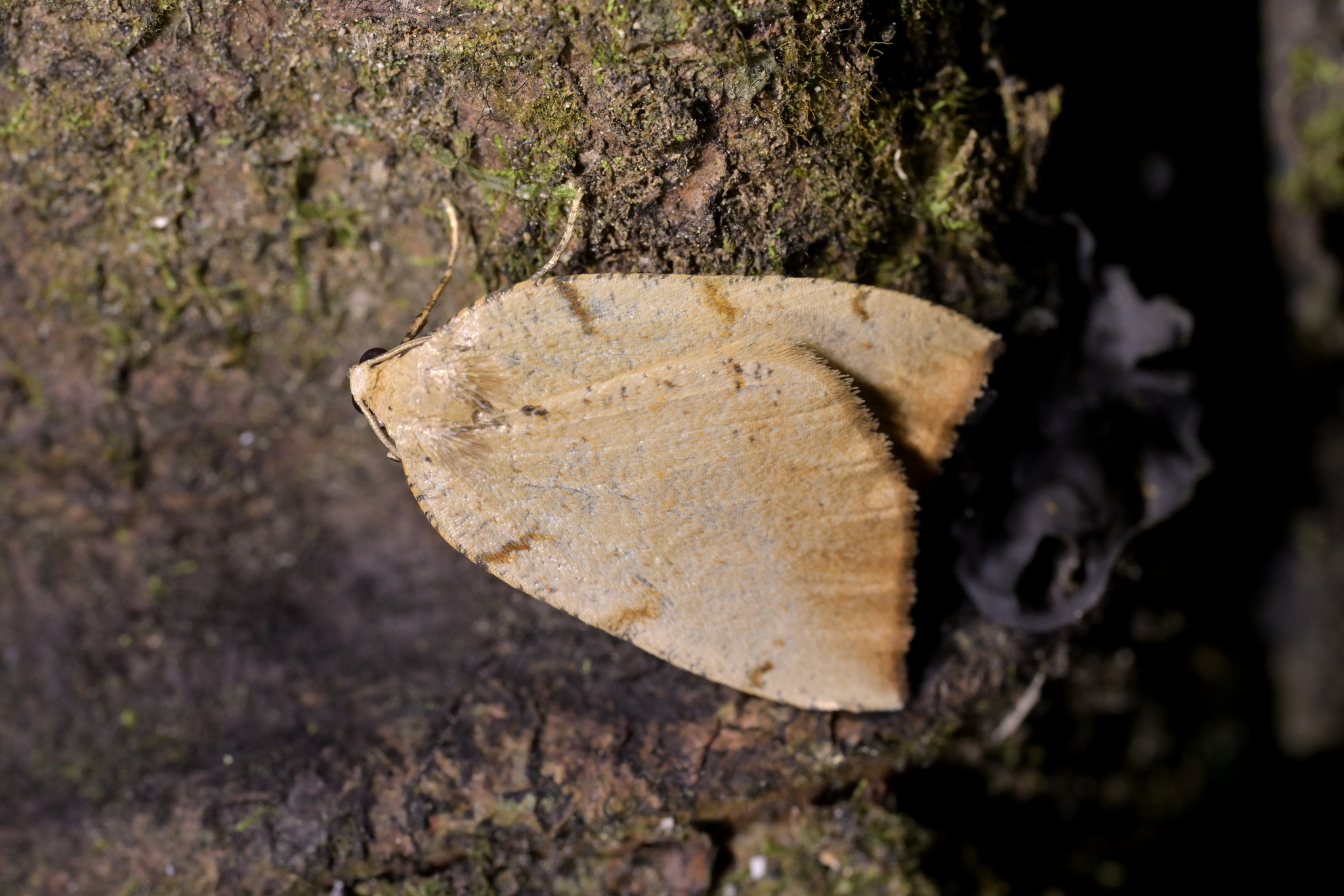
- Sestra humeraria, New Zealand

Scientific classification
- Kingdom: Animalia
- Phylum: Arthropoda
- Clade: Pancrustacea
- Class: Insecta
- Order: Lepidoptera
- Family: Geometridae
- Subfamily: Ennominae
- Tribe: Diptychini
- Genus: Sestra; Walker, 1863

Synonyms
- Amastris Meyrick, 1883; Pseudosestra Butler, 1882

= Sestra (moth) =

Genus of moths

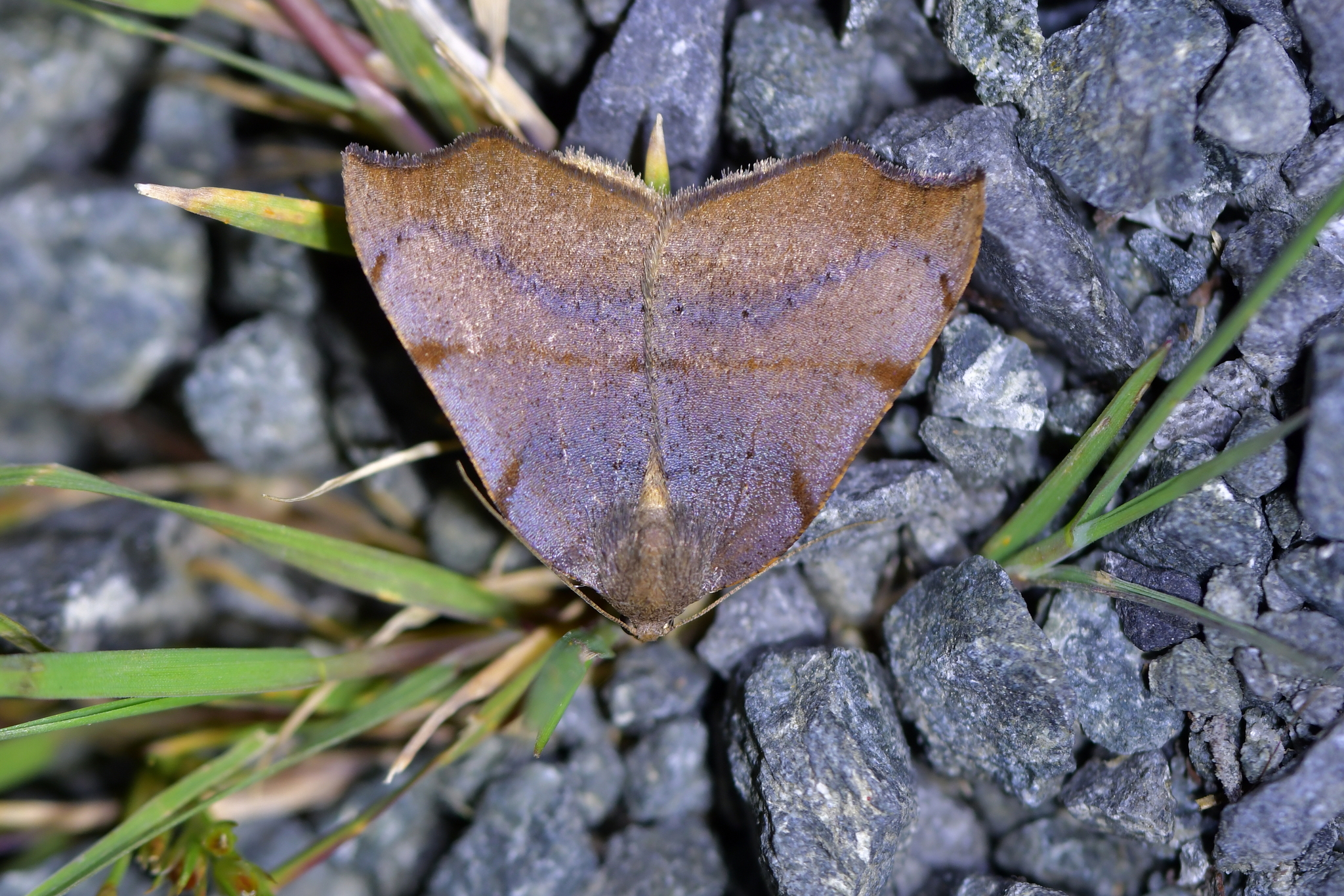
Sestra flexata, New Zealand

Sestra is a genus of geometer moths in the family Geometridae. There are at least two described species in Sestra. They are endemic to New Zealand.

== Species ==
These two species belong to the genus Sestra:

- Sestra flexata (Walker, 1862)
- Sestra humeraria (Walker, 1861)
