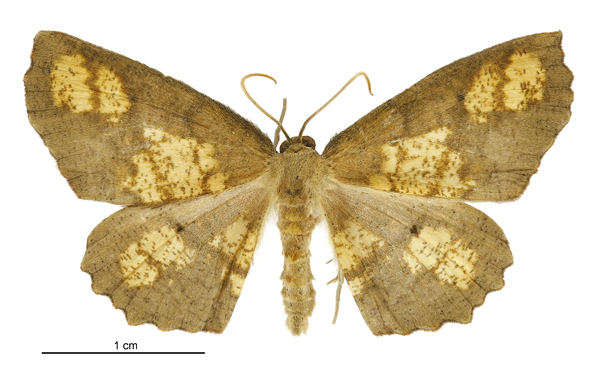
- Male specimen
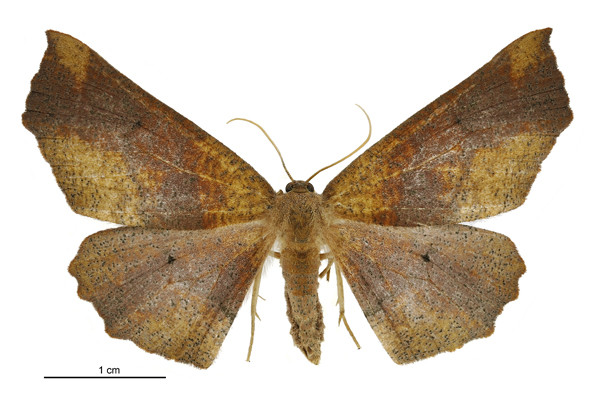
- Female specimen

Scientific classification
- Kingdom: Animalia
- Phylum: Arthropoda
- Clade: Pancrustacea
- Class: Insecta
- Order: Lepidoptera
- Family: Geometridae
- Genus: Xyridacma
- Species: X. ustaria

Binomial name
- Xyridacma ustaria (Walker, 1863)

Synonyms
- Ennomos ustaria Walker, 1863; Amilapis achroiaria Felder & Rogenhofer, 1875; Lyrcea varians Butler, 1879; Xyridacma ustaria unilinea Prout, 1920; Epirrhanthis ustaria (Walker, 1863)

= Xyridacma ustaria =

Species of moth

Xyridacma ustaria is a moth of the family Geometridae. It was first described by Francis Walker in 1863 from specimens obtained in Auckland. It is endemic to New Zealand. X. ustaria has been found on Codfish Island in May with larvae recorded on Pittosporum tenuifolium. It has also been found at Paroa in February as well as in Canterbury.

== Behaviour ==
Adults are attracted to light and have been collected via a mercury vapour light trap.
