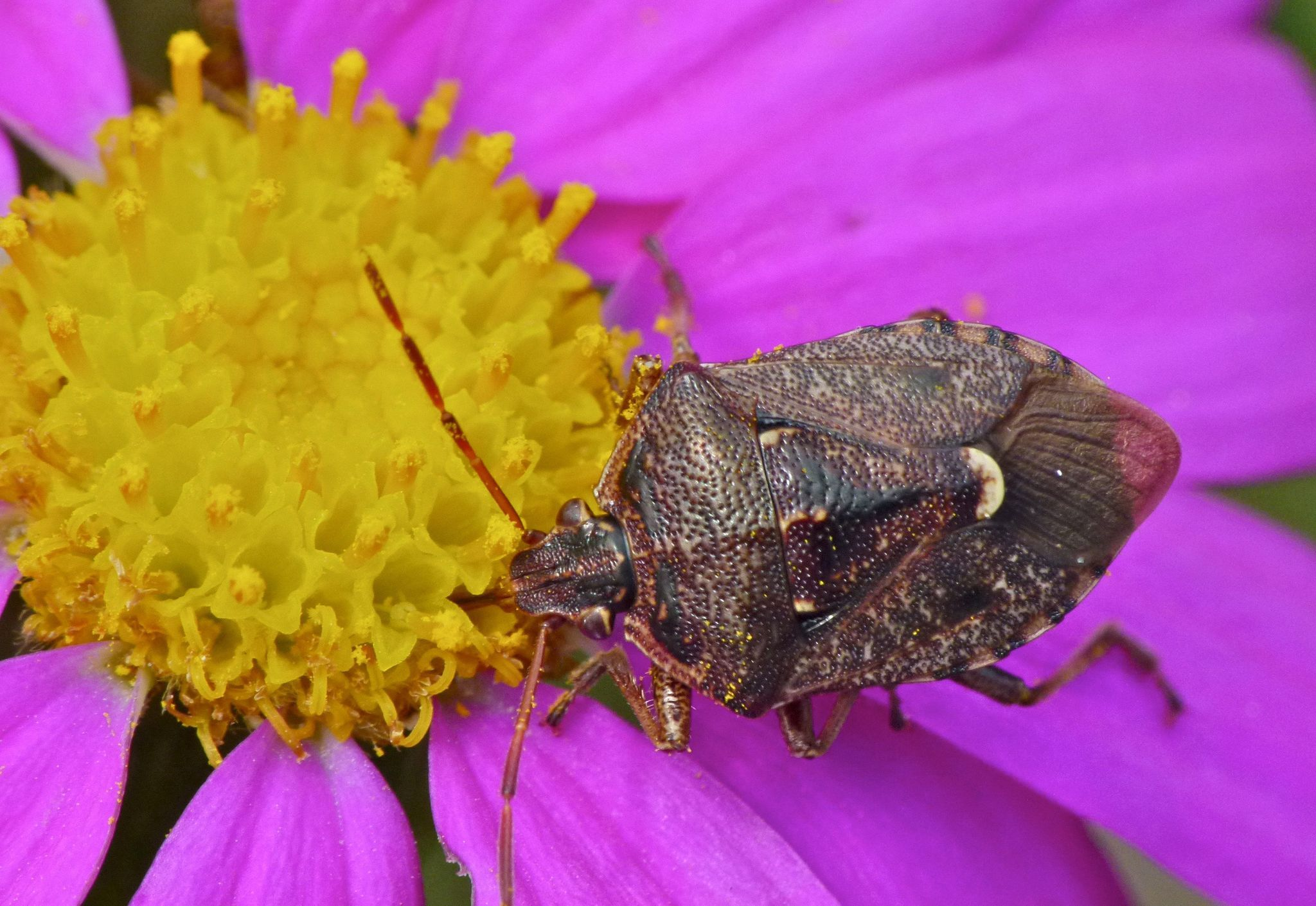

Scientific classification
- Kingdom: Animalia
- Phylum: Arthropoda
- Clade: Pancrustacea
- Class: Insecta
- Order: Hemiptera
- Suborder: Heteroptera
- Family: Pentatomidae
- Genus: Cermatulus
- Species: C. nasalis

Binomial name
- Cermatulus nasalis (Westwood, 1837)

= Cermatulus nasalis =

Species of true bug

Cermatulus nasalis is a species of predatory shield bug in the family Pentatomidae. It is commonly known as the brown soldier bug or glossy shield bug and is native to Australia and New Zealand.

== Taxonomy ==
The species was first identified by John Obadiah Westwood in 1837, who described the species as Aelia nasalis. In 1951 William Dallas created the genus Cermatulus, naming Cermatulus nasalis as the type species. The species has three known subspecies. C. turbotti, endemic to Manawatāwhi / Three Kings Islands northwest of New Zealand, was described as a species in 1950 by Thomas E. Woodward. Woodward later revised this designation in 1952, describing it as a subspecies of Cermatulus nasalis, however some authors such as Donald B. Thomas consider this to be a separate species.

=== Subspecies ===
Three subspecies are recognised:

- C. nasalis hudsoni Woodward 1953
- C. nasalis nasalis (Westwood, 1837)
- C. nasalis turbotti Woodward 1950
Subspecies illustrated by Des Helmore

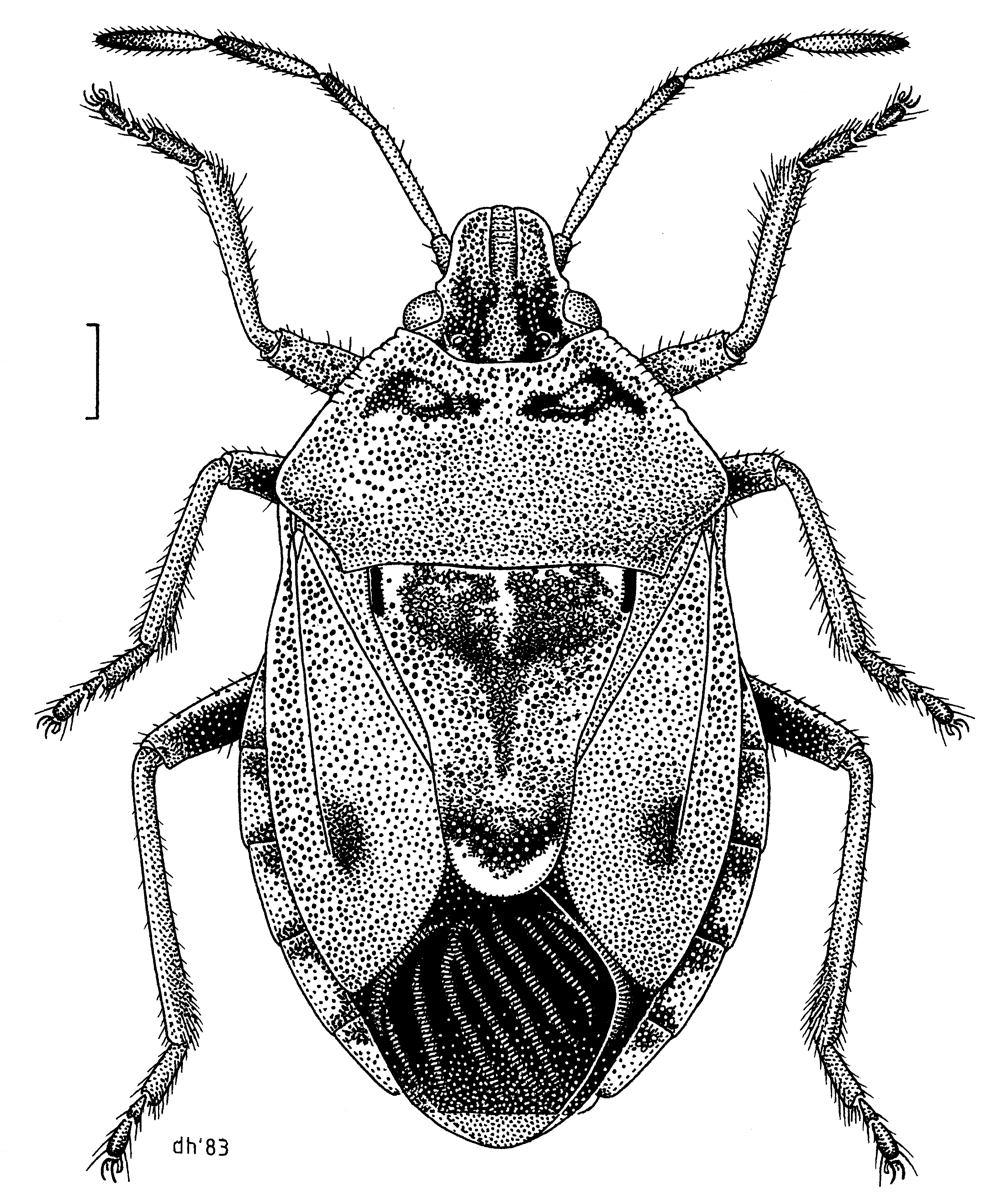
Cermatulus nasalis hudsoni

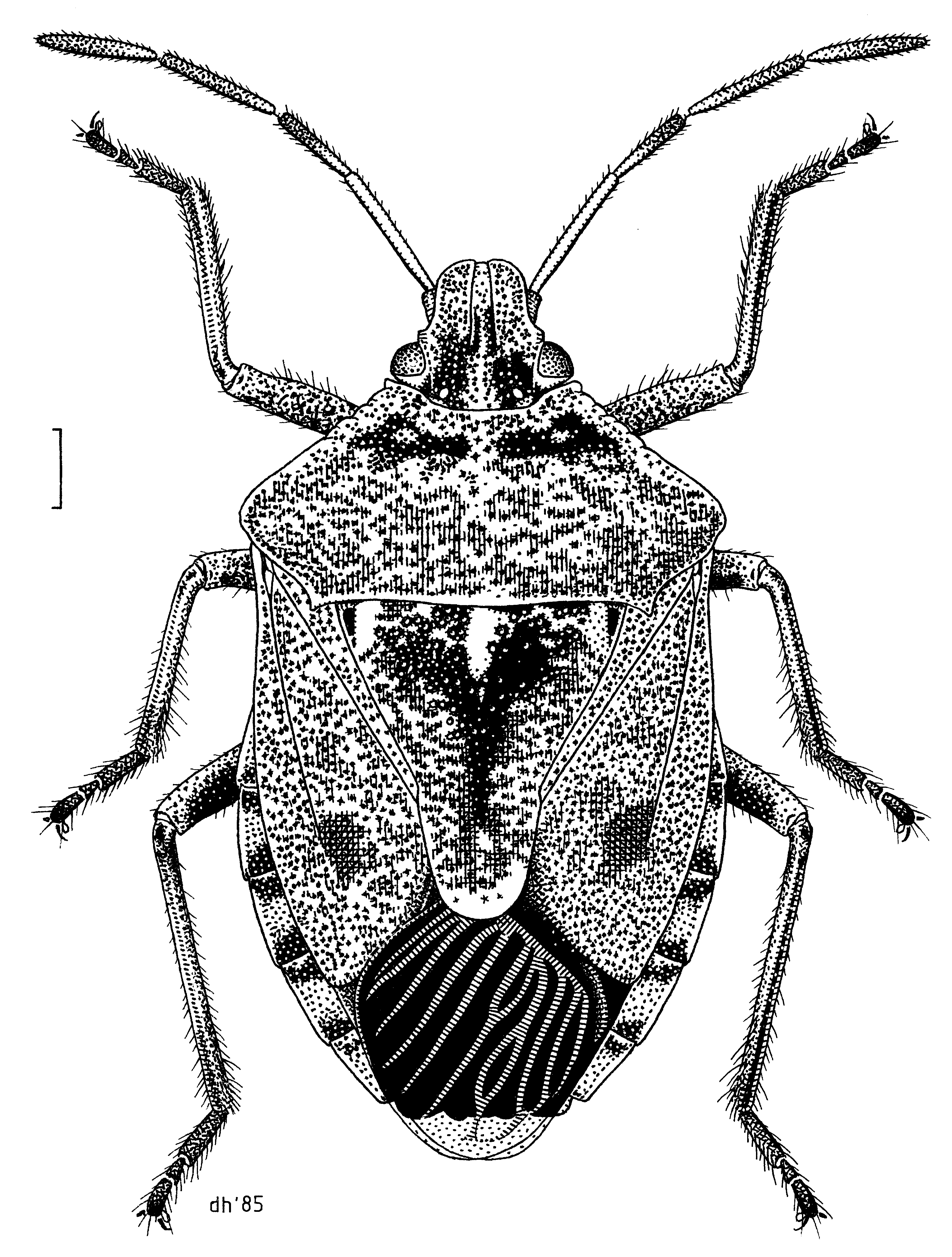
Cermatulus nasalis nasalis

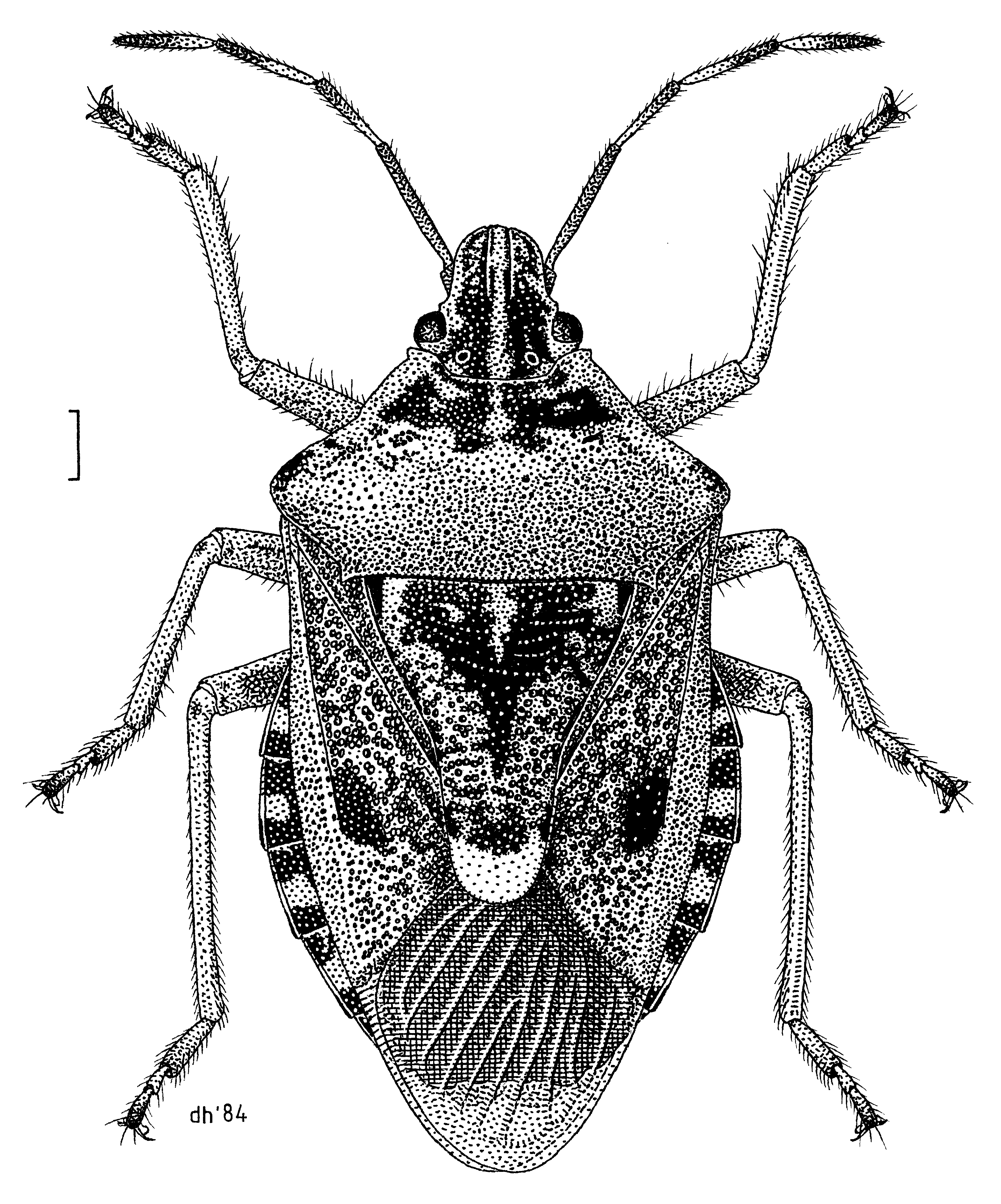
Cermatulus nasalis turbotti

== Description ==
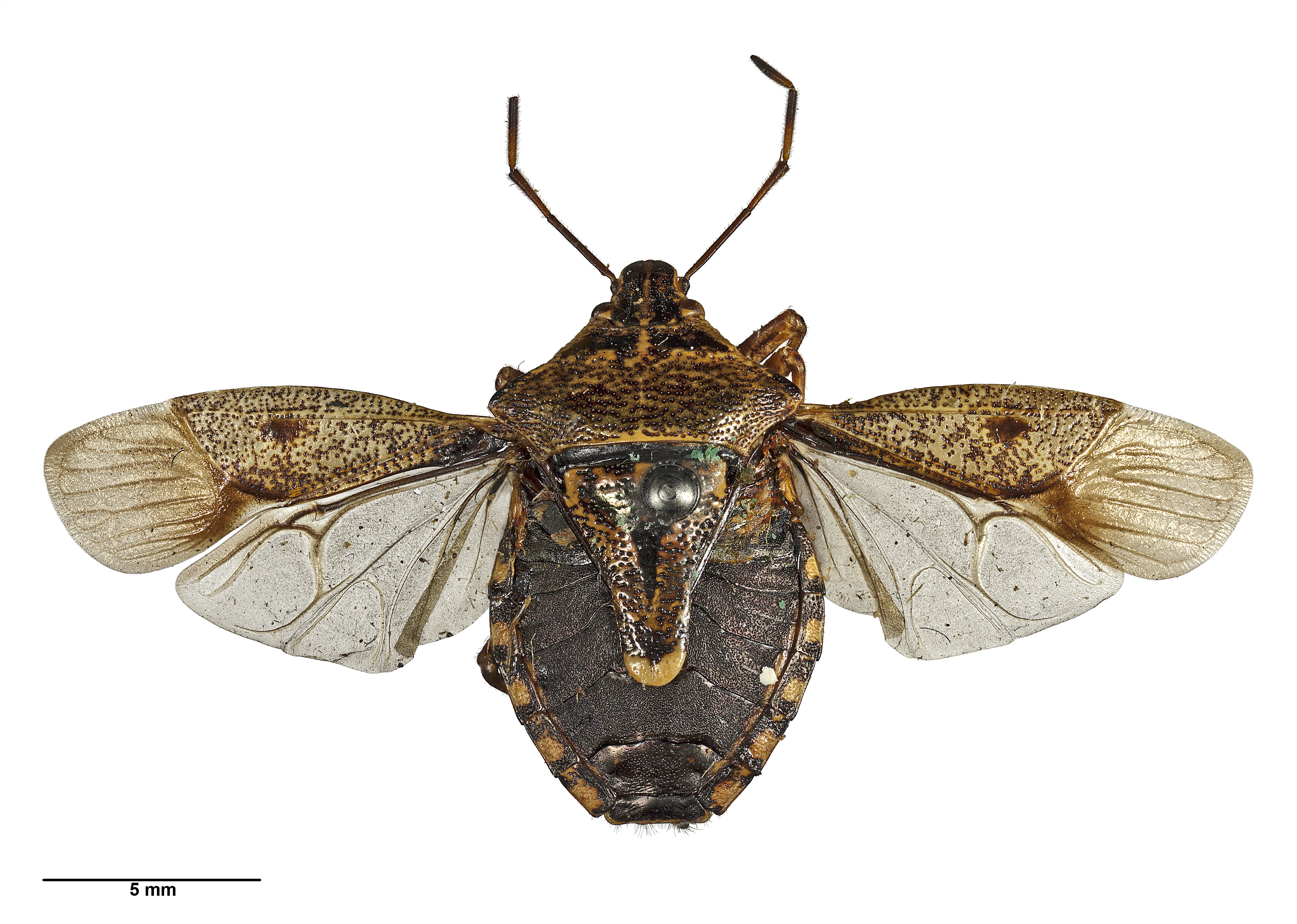
Holotype of Cermatulus nasalis turbotti

Female Cermatulus nasalis are between 10.5 and 12.5 millimetres (0.4 and 0.5 in) in length and males are slightly smaller. The head is brown and has a bluntly rounded snout. The prothorax is broadly triangular and marked with fine perforations, the colour being some shade of yellowish-, orangeish- or rusty-brown with blackish markings and fine brownish-black punctuations. The dorsal surface of the abdomen is black and the ventral surface a mottled yellowish-brown. The forewings are mainly brown, each having a large black triangular patch on the posterior part. The antennae and legs are yellowish-brown.

== Ecology ==
Cermatulus nasalis is predatory and feeds on a variety of insect species, plunging its beak into its prey and sucking out the body fluids. There is just one generation each year, breeding taking place over a period of several weeks during the summer. The female lays a batch of about thirty black eggs in three neat rows, on a leaf or patch of bark. The newly hatched nymphs are red with black heads and feed at first on the bacteria that coat the eggs, and also on plant sap. They moult five times, each instar having a different pattern of red and black markings. From the second instar onwards they are predators and feed on caterpillars and other insects with soft bodies.
