= List of Pentatomidae genera =

The following genera belong to the family Pentatomidae, stink bugs. There are almost 5000 species in ~940 genera of 10 subfamilies worldwide.

== Partial list of Pentatomidae genera ==
- Acesines Stål, 1876
- Acledra Signoret, 1864
- Acoloba Spinola, 1850
- Acrocorisellus Puton, 1886
- Acrosternum Fieber, 1860
- Adoxoplatys Breddin, 1903
- Adria Stål, 1876
- Adustonotus
- Aegaleus Stål, 1876
- Aelia Fabricius, 1803
- Aeliomorpha Stål, 1858
- Aenaria Stål, 1876
- Aeschrocoris Bergroth, 1887
- Afrania Stål, 1864
- Afrius Stål, 1870
- Agaeus Dallas, 1851
- Agonoscelis Spinola, 1837
- Agroecus Dallas, 1851
- Alcaeorrhynchus Bergroth, 1891
- Alcaeus Dallas, 1851
- Alcimocoris Bergroth, 1891
- Allopodops Harris & Johnston, 1936
- Amasenus Stål, 1864
- Amaurochrous Stål, 1872
- Amblycara
- Amyotea Ellenrieder, 1862
- Anaca Bergroth, 1891
- Anaxilaus Stål, 1876
- Anchises Stål, 1867
- Ancyrosoma Amyot & Serville, 1843
- Andrallus Bergroth, 1905
- Anolcus Bergroth, 1893
- Antestia Stål, 1864
- Antestiopsis Leston, 1952 (variegated coffee bug)
- Antheminia Mulsant & Rey, 1866
- Antiteuchus Dallas, 1851
- Apateticus Dallas, 1851
- Aplerotus Dallas, 1851
- Apodiphus Spinola 1837
- Apoecilus Stål, 1870
- Arma Hahn 1832
- Arocera Spinola, 1837
- Arvelius Spinola, 1840
- Asaroticus Jakovlev, 1884
- Ascra Say, 1832
- Aspavia Stål, 1865
- Aspideurus Signoret, 1880
- Atelocera Laporte, 1832
- Austromalaya Kirkaldy, 1908
- Auxentius Horváth, 1915
- Avicenna Distant, 1901
- Axiagastus Dallas, 1851
- Bagrada Stål, 1862
- Banasa Stål, 1860
- Basicryptus Herrich-Schäffer, 1844
- Bathrus Dallas, 1851
- Bathycoelia
- Berecynthus Stål, 1862
- Biprorulus Breddin, 1900
- Boerias Kirkaldy, 1909
- Bolbocoris Amyot & Serville, 1843
- Brachycerocoris Costa, 1863
- Brachycoris Stål, 1870
- Brachymna Stål, 1861
- Brachynema Mulsant & Rey, 1852
- Brachystethus Laporte de Castelnau, 1833
- Brepholoxa Van Duzee, 1904
- Brochymena Amyot & Serville, 1843 (rough stink bugs)
- Bromocoris Horváth, 1915
- Brontocoris
- Cantheconidea Schouteden, 1907
- Capnoda Jakovlev, 1887
- Cappaea Ellenrieder, 1862
- Carbula Stal 1876
- Carpocoris Kolenati 1846
- Catacanthus Spinola, 1837
- Caura Stål, 1864
- Caystrus Stål, 1861
- Cazira Amyot & Serville, 1843
- Cephaloplatus White, 1842
- Ceratozigum
- Cermatulus Dallas, 1851
- Chalazonotum Ribes & Schmitz, 1992
- Chalcocoris Dallas, 1851
- Chalcopis Kirkaldy, 1909
- Chinavia Orian, 1965 (green stink bugs)
- Chlorochroa Stål, 1872
- Chlorocoris Spinola, 1837
- Chroantha Stl, 1872
- Codophila Mulsant & Rey, 1866
- Coenomorpha Dallas, 1851
- Coenus Dallas, 1851
- Coleotichus White, 1839
- Colpocarena Stål, 1868
- Commius Stål, 1876
- Comperocoris Stål, 1867
- Conquistator
- Coquerelia
- Coryzorhaphis Spinola, 1837
- Cosmopepla Stål, 1867
- Cratonotus
- Cresphontes Stål, 1867
- Critheus Stål, 1867
- Crypsinus Dohrn, 1860
- Cuspicona Dallas, 1851
- Cyptocephala Berg, 1883
- Cyrtocoris White, 1842
- Dalpada Amyot & Audinet-Serville, 1843
- Dalsira Amyot & Serville, 1843
- Degonetus Distant, 1902
- Delegorguella Spinola, 1850
- Dendrocoris Bergroth, 1891
- Deroploa Westwood, 1835
- Derula Mulsant & Rey, 1856
- Diaphyta Bergroth, 1891
- Dichelops Spinola, 1837
- Dictyotus Dallas, 1851
- Diemenia
- Dinocoris Burmeister, 1835
- Dinorhynchus Jakovlev, 1876
- Diplorhinus Amyot & Serville, 1843
- Diploxys Amyot & Serville, 1843
- Discocephala Laporte, 1833
- Discocera de Laporte, 1832
- Dolycoris Mulsant & Rey, 1866
- Dorycoris Mayr, 1864
- Doryderes Amyot & Serville, 1843
- Dryadocoris Kirkaldy, 1909
- Dryptocephala Laporte de Castelnau, 1833
- Durmia Stål, 1864
- Dybowskyia Jakovlev, 1876
- Dyroderes Spinola 1837
- Ealda Walker, 1867
- Ectenus Dallas, 1851
- Edessa Fabricius, 1803
- Ennius Stål, 1861
- Eocanthecoma Bergroth, 1915
- Eocanthecona Bergroth, 1915
- Eonymia Linnavuori, 1982
- Erachtheus Stål, 1861
- Eribotes Stål, 1867
- Erthesina Spinola, 1837
- Eudolycoris Tamanini, 1959
- Eudryadocoris Linnavuori, 1975
- Eurus Dallas, 1851
- Eurydema Laporte
- Eurysaspis Signoret, 1851
- Eusarcoris Hahn
- Euschistus Dallas, 1851
- Euthyrhynchus Dallas, 1851
- Everardia
- Eysarcoris Hahn, 1834
- Fecelia Stål, 1872
- Flaminia
- Galedanta Amyot & Serville, 1843
- Gellia Stål, 1864
- Glaucias Kirkaldy, 1908
- Glottaspis Bergroth, 1918
- Glypsus Dallas, 1851
- Gonopsis Amyot & Serville, 1843
- Grammedessa
- Graphosoma Laporte, 1833
- Gulielmus Distant, 1901
- Gynenica Dallas, 1851
- Halyabbas Distant, 1900
- Halyomorpha Mayr, 1864
- Halys Fabricius 1803
- Hermolaus Distant, 1902
- Heteroscelis Latreille, 1829
- Hippotiscus Bergroth, 1906
- Holcogaster Fieber, 1861
- Holcostethus Fieber, 1860
- Homalogonia Jakolev, 1876
- Hoplistodera Westwood, 1837
- Humria Linnavuori, 1975
- Hymenarcys Amyot & Serville, 1843
- Hypatropis Bergroth, 1891
- Hypsithocus Bergroth, 1927
- Hyrmine Stål, 1876
- Jalla C.W.Hahn, 1832
- Janeirona Distant, 1911
- Kalkadoona Distant, 1910
- Kapunda Distant, 1911
- Kayesia Schouteden, 1903
- Kermana Rolston & McDonald, 1981
- Lakhonia Descarpentries & Villiers, 1967
- Laprius Stål, 1861
- Lattinidea Rider & Eger, 2008
- Lelia Walker, 1867
- Lerida Karsch, 1894
- Lincus Stål, 1867
- Lineostethus Ruckes, 1966
- Lobepomis Berg, 1891
- Lopadusa Stål, 1858
- Loxa Amyot & Serville, 1843
- Macropygium Spinola, 1837
- Macrorhaphis Dallas, 1851
- Madates Strand, 1910
- Mayrinia Horváth, 1925
- Mcphersonarcys
- Mecidea Dallas, 1851 (narrow stink bugs)
- Mecistorhinus Dallas, 1851
- Mecosoma Dallas, 1851
- Megarrhamphus Laporte, 1832
- Memmia Stål, 1864
- Menecles Stål, 1867
- Menida Motschoulsky, 1862
- Minchamia Gross, 1976
- Monteithiella Gross, 1976
- Mormidea Amyot & Serville, 1843
- Morna
- Moromorpha Rolston, 1978
- Murgantia Stål, 1862
- Mustha Amyot & Serville, 1843
- Mycoolona Distant, 1910
- Myota Spinola, 1850
- Neagenor Bergroth, 1891
- Nealeria Bergroth, 1893
- Neapodops Slater & Baranowski, 1970
- Neoacledra
- Neohalys Ahmad & Perveen, 1982
- Neojurtina Distant, 1921
- Neopharnus Van Duzee, 1910
- Neostrachia Saunders, 1877
- Neotibilis Grazia & Barcellos, 1994
- Neottiglossa Kirby, 1837
- Nezara Amyot & Serville, 1843
- Niphe Stål, 1867
- Notius Dallas, 1851
- Notopodops Barber & Sailer, 1953
- Novatilla Distant, 1888
- Ochlerus Spinola, 1837
- Ochrophara
- Ocirrhoe Stål, 1876
- Odmalea Bergroth, 1915
- Oebalus Stål, 1862
- Oechalia Stål, 1862
- Oenopiella Bergroth, 1891
- Okeanos Distant, 1911
- Omyta Spinola, 1850
- Oncocoris Mayr, 1866
- Oncozygia Stål, 1872
- Oplomus Spinola, 1840
- Orthoschizops
- Otantestia Breddin, 1900
- Padaeus Stål, 1862
- Pallantia Stål, 1862
- Palomena Mulsant & Rey 1866
- Pantachoa
- Pantochlora Stål, 1870
- Paracritheus Bergroth, 1891
- Paraedessa Silva & Fernandes, 2013
- Parajalla Distant, 1911
- Parantestia Linnavuori, 1973
- Paterculus Distant, 1902
- Pausias
- Pelidnocoris Stål, 1867
- Pellaea Stål, 1872
- Peltasticus Dallas, 1851
- Pentatoma Latreille 1802
- Peribalus Mulsant & Rey, 1866
- Perillus Stål, 1862
- Peromatus Amyot & Audinet-Serville, 1843
- Phalaecus Stål, 1862
- Pharypia Stål, 1861
- Phoeacia Stål, 1862
- Phricodus Spinola, 1839
- Phyllocephala Laporte, 1832
- Picromerus Amyot & Serville, 1843
- Piezodorus Fieber, 1860
- Pinthaeus Stål, 1868
- Placosternum Amyot & Serville, 1843
- Platacantha
- Platycarenus Fieber, 1860
- Platycoris
- Platynopus Amyot & Serville, 1843
- Plautia Stål, 1864
- Podisus Herrich-Schaeffer, 1851
- Pododus Amyot & Serville, 1843
- Podops Laporte, 1833
- Poecilometis Dallas, 1851
- Polycarmes Stål, 1867
- Priassus Stål, 1867
- Prionaca Dallas, 1851
- Prionosoma Uhler, 1863
- Protestrica Schouteden, 1905
- Proxys Spinola, 1840
- Pseudapines Bergroth, 1911
- Pseudatelus Linnavuori, 1982
- Pseudevoplitus Ruckes, 1958
- Putonia Stl, 1872
- Pygoda Amyot & Audinet-Serville, 1843
- Ramosiana Kormilev, 1950
- Rhacognathus Fieber, 1861
- Rhaphigaster Laporte de Castelnau, 1833
- Rhynchocoris Westwood, 1837
- Rhyncholepta Bergroth, 1911
- Rhyssocephala Rider, 1991
- Rio Kirkaldy, 1909
- Roferta Rolston, 1981
- Rolstoniellus Rider, 1997
- Rubiconia
- Runibia Stål, 1861
- Sabaeus Stål, 1867
- Saceseurus Breddin, 1900
- Schraderiellus Rider, 1998
- Schyzops Spinola, 1837
- Sciocoris Fallén, 1829
- Scotinophara Stål, 1867
- Scribonia Stål, 1864
- Sepontia Stål, 1864
- Serbana Distant, 1906
- Sibaria Stål, 1872
- Spinalanx Rolston & Rider, 1988
- Stagonomus Gorski, 1852
- Staria Dohrn, 1860
- Starioides Matsumura, 1913
- Steleocoris Mayr, 1864
- Stenozygum Fieber, 1861
- Sternodontus Mulsant & Rey, 1856
- Stictochilus Bergroth, 1918
- Stiretrus Laporte, 1833
- Storthecoris Horváth, 1883
- Strachia Hahn, 1833
- Supputius Distant, 1889
- Surenus
- Tachengia China, 1925
- Tarisa Amyot & Serville, 1843
- Taurocerus Amyot & Serville, 1843
- Tepa Rolston & McDonald, 1984
- Testrica Walker, 1867
- Tetroda Amyot & Serville, 1843
- Theloris Stål, 1864
- Theseus Stål, 1867
- Tholagmus Stål, 1860
- Tholosanus Distant, 1899
- Thyanta Stål, 1860
- Tibraca Stal, 1860
- Tinganina Bergroth, 1909
- Tolumnia Stål, 1867
- Tornosia Bolívar, 1879
- Trichopepla Stål, 1867
- Tricompastes Cachan, 1952
- Tripanda Berg, 1899
- Trochiscocoris Reuter, 1890
- Troilus Stål, 1867
- Tropicorypha Mayr, 1864
- Tylospilus Stål, 1870
- Tynacantha Dallas, 1851
- Tyoma Spinola, 1850
- Tyrannocoris
- Udonga Distant, 1921
- Ventocoris Hahn, 1834
- Veterna Stål, 1864
- Vilpianus Stål, 1860
- Vitellus Stål, 1865
- Vulsirea Spinola, 1837
- Weda Schouteden, 1905
- Zaplutus Bergroth, 1893
- Zicrona Amyot & Serville, 1843
- † Carpocoroides Jordan, 1967
- † Deryeuma Piton, 1940
- † Halynoides Jordan, 1967
- † Necanicarbula Zhang, 1989
- † Olbia
- † Pentatomoides Jordan, 1967
- † Pseudopalomena Jordan, 1967
- † Rhomboidea Jordan, 1967
- † Suspectocoris Jordan, 1967
