= Geomorpha =

Geomorpha may refer to:

- Geomorpha (bug), a genus of shield-bugs in the subfamily Pentatominae
- Geomorpha (mammal), an infraorder of rodents
