= Scribonia =

Scribonia may refer to:

- Scribonia gens, a family in ancient Rome
  - Scribonia (wife of Octavian)
  - Scribonia (wife of Crassus)
- Scribonia (bug), a genus in the family Pentatomidae of stink bugs
- Hypercompe scribonia, the giant leopard moth
