= Tolumnia =

Tolumnia is the scientific name of two genera of organisms and may refer to:

- Tolumnia (bug), a genus of insects in the family Pentatomidae
- Tolumnia (plant), a genus of plants in the family Orchidaceae
