= Lerida =

Lerida may refer to:

- Lerida (bug), a genus of shield bugs
- Lerida, New South Wales, a locality in Australia
- Lérida, Tolima, a town in Colombia
- Lleida (Castilian: Lérida), a city in Catalonia, Spain
- Province of Lleida, Catalonia, Spain
