= Odmalea schaefferi =

Scientific classification
- Kingdom: Animalia
- Phylum: Arthropoda
- Class: Insecta
- Order: Hemiptera
- Suborder: Heteroptera
- Family: Pentatomidae
- Genus: Odmalea
- Species: O. schaefferi

Binomial name
- Odmalea schaefferi (Barber, 1906)

Species of true bug

Odmalea schaefferi is a species of stink bug in the family Pentatomidae. It is found in North America.
