= Phavorinus =

Scientific classification
- Kingdom: Animalia
- Phylum: Arthropoda
- Clade: Pancrustacea
- Class: Insecta
- Order: Hemiptera
- Suborder: Heteroptera
- Family: Pentatomidae
- Tribe: Menidini
- Genus: Phavorinus; Distant, 1902

Genus of shield bugs

Phavorinus is a genus of shield-bugs in the subfamily Pentatominae and tribe Menidini, erected by William Lucas Distant in 1902.
