= Bathycoelia thalassina =

Scientific classification
- Kingdom: Animalia
- Phylum: Arthropoda
- Class: Insecta
- Order: Hemiptera
- Suborder: Heteroptera
- Family: Pentatomidae
- Subfamily: Pentatominae
- Tribe: Bathycoeliini
- Genus: Bathycoelia
- Species: B. thalassina

Binomial name
- Bathycoelia thalassina (Herrich-Schäffer, 1844)

Species of insect

Bathycoelia thalassina is a species of African shield bugs in the subfamily Pentatominae.

== Description ==
B. thalassina is a large, mostly green species of shield bug with a length of 20–21 mm. The flattened lateral border of the abdomen (connexivum) has a black pattern more or less black with round pale spot in middle of each segment. The pronotum has very dense puncturing, the surface of the disk therefore rugose and opaque.

== Cocoa Pest ==
B. thalassina has been recognised as a 'new encounter pest' of West African cacao, Theobroma cacao since the 1960s, when it was observed that "large nymphs and adults … feed on developing cocoa pods, causing damage to the beans. The small nymphs feed mainly on the leaves and do little damage. The adults have long feeding stylets (about 22 mm) which can penetrate the pod cortex and suck liquid from the developing beans. This results in malformed or atrophied beans. In ripe pods the malformed beans are brown instead of pink, and dry, lacking the sugary mucilage which normally covers beans."
