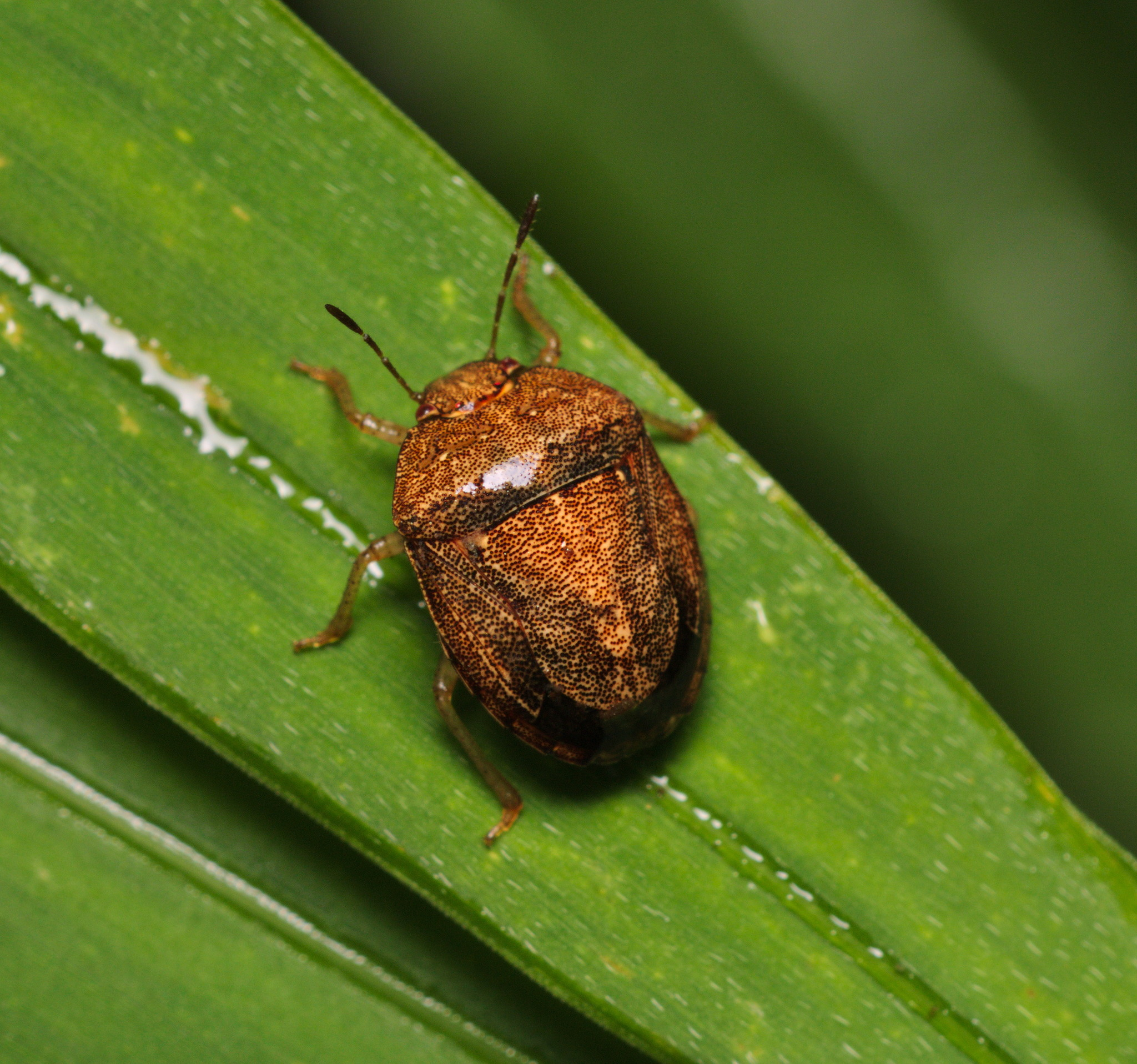
- Aednus ventralis

Scientific classification
- Kingdom: Animalia
- Phylum: Arthropoda
- Clade: Pancrustacea
- Class: Insecta
- Order: Hemiptera
- Suborder: Heteroptera
- Family: Pentatomidae
- Subfamily: Pentatominae
- Tribe: Myrocheini; Stål, 1871

Synonyms
- Dorpiini Distant, 1902 (As Dorpiaria); Dymantini Distant, 1902; Myrochana Atkinson, 1888; Myrocheina Stål, 1871

= Myrocheini =

Tribe of true bugs

The Myrocheini are a tribe of shield bug genera in the subfamily Pentatominae, erected by Carl Stål in 1871. As of 2026, public observations of occurrence include the African, eastern Palaearctic, Australasian and the Indomalayan realms.

== Genera ==
BioLib includes:

1. Aednulus Breddin, 1901
2. Aednus Dallas, 1851
3. Arniscus Distant, 1899
4. Delegorguella Spinola, 1850
5. Dictyotus Dallas, 1851
6. Dictytotus Dallas, 1851
7. Dissocolpus Bergroth, 1906
8. Dollingiana Ahmad & Kamaluddin, 1986
9. Dymantis Stål, 1861
10. Ennius Stål, 1861
11. Erachtheus Stål, 1861
12. Humria Linnavuori, 1975
13. Jitka Kment, 2015
14. Laprius Stål, 1861
15. Lodosia Ahmad & Önder, 1996
16. Munshiana Ahmad & Kamaluddin, 1987
17. Myrochea Amyot & Serville, 1843
18. Neococalus Bergroth, 1891
19. Neodorpius Ahmad & Afzal, 1989
20. Paradictyotus Gross, 1975
21. Pretorius Distant, 1898
22. Stysicoris Ahmad & Kamaluddin, 1985
23. Tholosanus Distant, 1899
24. Utheria Gross, 1975
