= Anchesmus =

Scientific classification
- Domain: Eukaryota
- Kingdom: Animalia
- Phylum: Arthropoda
- Class: Insecta
- Order: Hemiptera
- Suborder: Heteroptera
- Family: Pentatomidae
- Tribe: Menidini
- Genus: Anchesmus; Stål, 1876

Genus of shield bugs

Anchesmus is a genus of shield-bugs in the subfamily Pentatominae and tribe Menidini, erected by Carl Stål in 1876.
