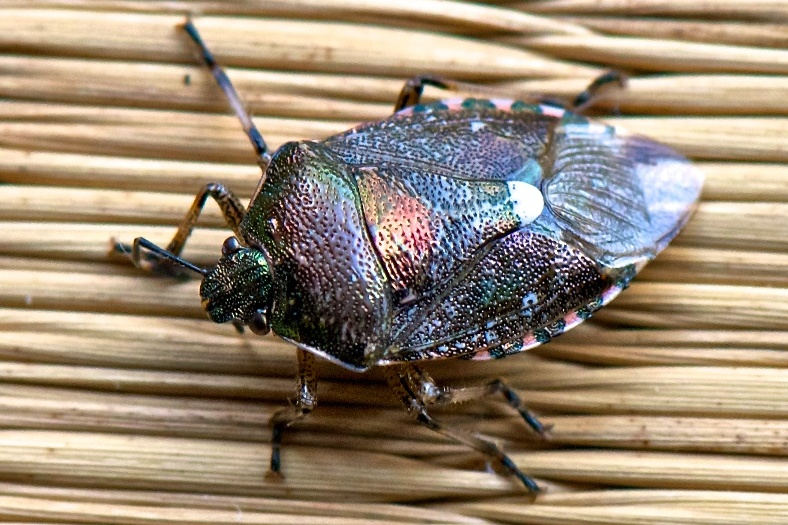
- Menida violacea

Scientific classification
- Kingdom: Animalia
- Phylum: Arthropoda
- Clade: Pancrustacea
- Class: Insecta
- Order: Hemiptera
- Suborder: Heteroptera
- Family: Pentatomidae
- Subfamily: Pentatominae
- Tribe: Menidini
- Genus: Menida; Motschulsky, 1861

Synonyms
- Pygomenida Breddin, 1898; Stromatocoris Jakovlev, 1876

= Menida =

Genus of true bugs

Menida is a genus of African, Asian and Australian shield-bugs in the subfamily Pentatominae and typical of the tribe Menidini; it was erected by Victor Motschulsky in 1861.

== Species ==
GBIF includes:

1. Menida disjecta (Uhler, 1860)
2. Menida formosa (Westwood, 1837)
3. Menida lata Yang, 1934
4. Menida megaspila (Walker, 1867)
5. Menida musiva (JakovLev, 1867)
6. Menida varipennis (Westwood, 1837)
7. Menida versicolor (Gmelin, 1790)
8. Menida violacea Motschulsky, 1861
