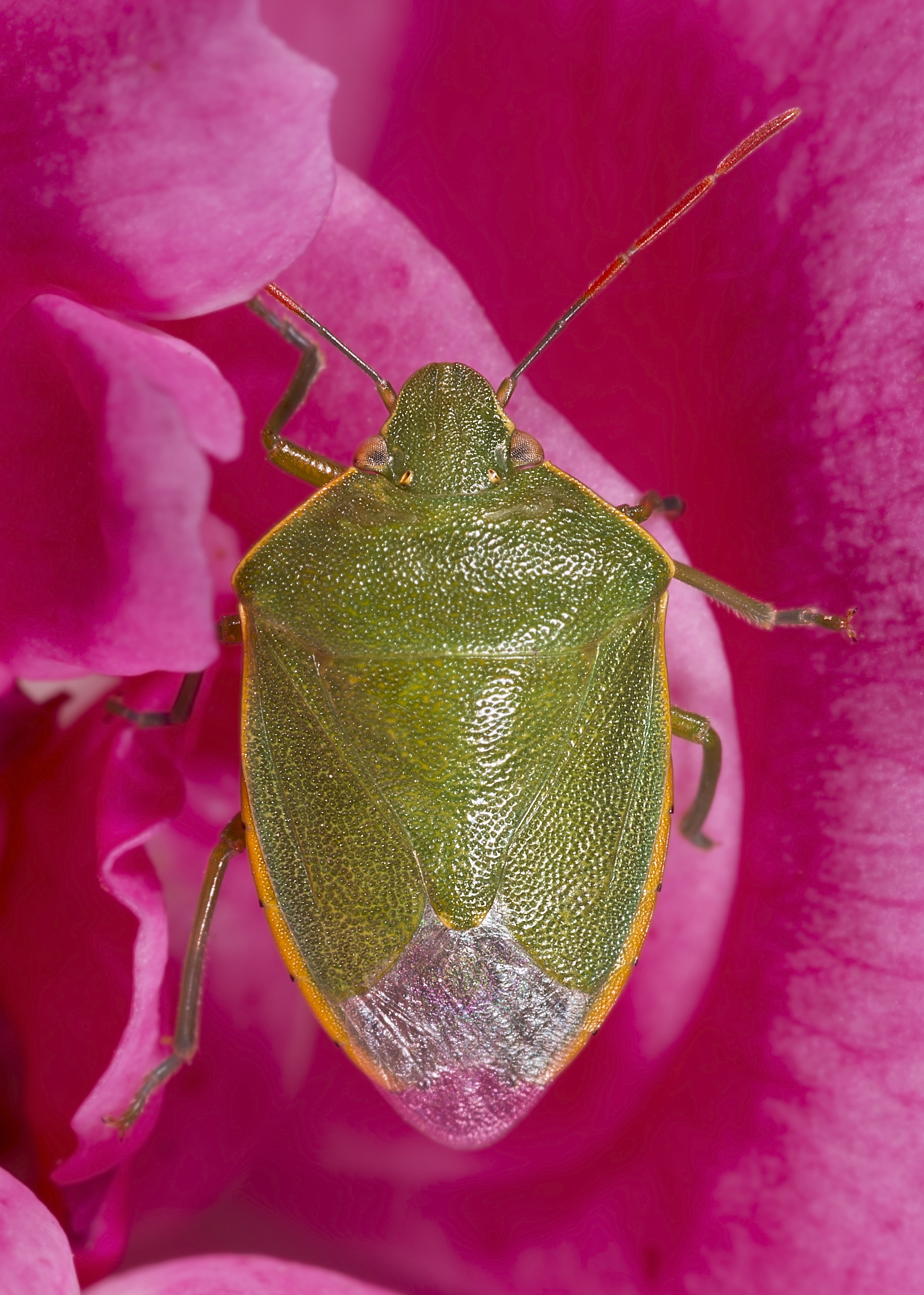
- Acrosternum heegeri, France

Scientific classification
- Kingdom: Animalia
- Phylum: Arthropoda
- Clade: Pancrustacea
- Class: Insecta
- Order: Hemiptera
- Suborder: Heteroptera
- Family: Pentatomidae
- Subfamily: Pentatominae
- Genus: Acrosternum; Fieber, 1860

= Acrosternum =

Genus of true bugs

Acrosternum is a genus of stink bugs in the family Pentatomidae. There are about 14 described species in Acrosternum.

== Species ==
These species belong to the genus Acrosternum:

- Acrosternum apicale Linnavuori, 1975
- Acrosternum arabicum Wagner, 1959
- Acrosternum breviceps (Jakovlev, 1889)
- Acrosternum curticeps Linnavuori & Al-Safadi, 1993
- Acrosternum gramineum (Fabricius, 1787)
- Acrosternum heegeri Fieber, 1861
- Acrosternum insularum Lindberg, 1958
- Acrosternum malickyi Josifov & Heiss, 1989
- Acrosternum miliaris (Klug, 1845)
- Acrosternum millierei (Mulsant & Rey, 1866)
- Acrosternum nigeriensis Wagner, 1961
- Acrosternum prunasis (Dallas, 1851)
- Acrosternum pusniensis Ahmad & Rana, 1989
- Acrosternum rubescens (Noualhier, 1893)
