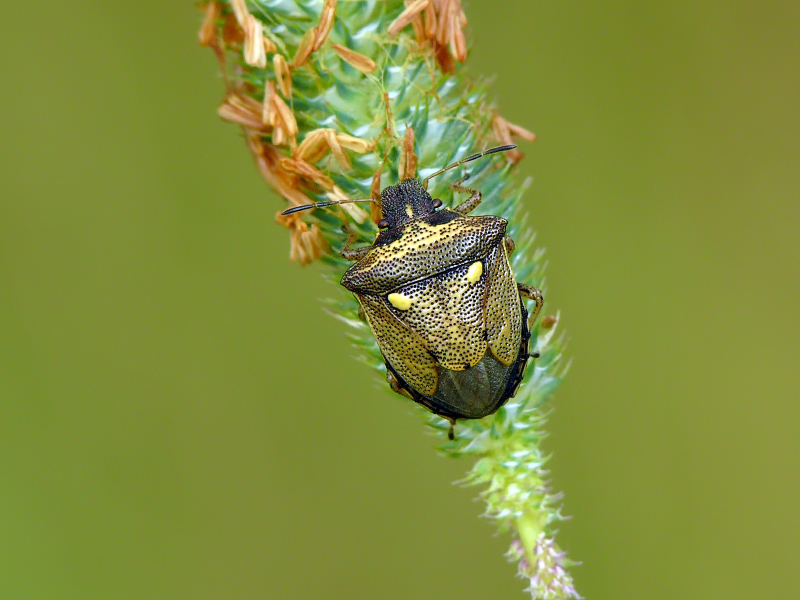
- Eysarcoris aeneus

Scientific classification
- Domain: Eukaryota
- Kingdom: Animalia
- Phylum: Arthropoda
- Class: Insecta
- Order: Hemiptera
- Suborder: Heteroptera
- Family: Pentatomidae
- Tribe: Eysarcorini
- Genus: Eysarcoris; Hahn, 1834

Synonyms
- Analocus Stål, 1872; Bainbriggeanus Distant, 1918; Gobisa Gorski, 1852; Neocarbula Distant, 1918; Neostollia Distant, 1910; Stollia Ellenrieder, 1862

= Eysarcoris =

Genus of true bugs

Eysarcoris is a genus of shield bugs belonging to the family Pentatomidae, subfamily Pentatominae, and typical of the tribe Eysarcorini.

== Description ==
Stink bugs of this genus are relatively small (<6 mm in length) and obovate in shape. There is a dense covering of punctures on much of the body. The head and the ventral surface of the thorax are covered with club-shaped hairs.

Eysarcoris belongs to a group of stink bugs (also including Sepontia, Spermatodes and Stagonomus) which have a broad scutellum and an auriculate/spine-like process anterior to the scent gland opening, and do not have a median sulcus in the thoracic sterna.

== Ecology ==
Eysarcoris are herbivores that live on various plants.

Some Eysarcoris are plant pests: E. guttiger is a pest of soybean and sesame, while E. trimaculatus and E. ventralis are pests of rice.

== Research ==
The mitochondrial genomes of various Eysarcoris species have been sequenced.

== Species ==
- Eysarcoris aeneus (Scopoli, 1763)
- Eysarcoris confusus Fuente, 1971
- Eysarcoris distinctus (Schouteden)
- Eysarcoris hispalensis Fuente, 1971
- Eysarcoris lereddii (Le Guillou)
- Eysarcoris luisae Fuente, 1971
- Eysarcoris perlatus Fabricius
- Eysarcoris uniformis Fuente, 1971
- Eysarcoris ventralis (Westwood, 1837) - white spotted bug
