= Bolaca =

Scientific classification
- Kingdom: Animalia
- Phylum: Arthropoda
- Class: Insecta
- Order: Hemiptera
- Suborder: Heteroptera
- Family: Pentatomidae
- Subfamily: Pentatominae
- Tribe: Amyntorini
- Genus: Bolaca; Walker, 1867

Synonyms
- Amyntor Stål, 1868; Oestopis Distant, 1879

Genus of grasshoppers

Bolaca is a genus of shield-bugs in the subfamily Pentatominae, erected by Francis Walker in 1867. It is the type genus of the tribe Amyntorini, after its synonym Amyntor. B. unicolor can be found in the Palearctic realm.

== Species ==
BioLib includes:

1. Bolaca pallidus Breddin, 1900
2. Bolaca unicolor Walker, 1867
