= Lakhonia =

Scientific classification
- Kingdom: Animalia
- Phylum: Arthropoda
- Class: Insecta
- Order: Hemiptera
- Suborder: Heteroptera
- Family: Pentatomidae
- Subfamily: Pentatominae
- Genus: Lakhonia; Yang, 1936
- Species: L. nigripes

Binomial name
- Lakhonia nigripes Yang, 1936

Genus of true bugs

Lakhonia is a monotypic genus of bugs, incertae sedis in the subfamily Pentatominae, containing the species Lakhonia nigripes.
