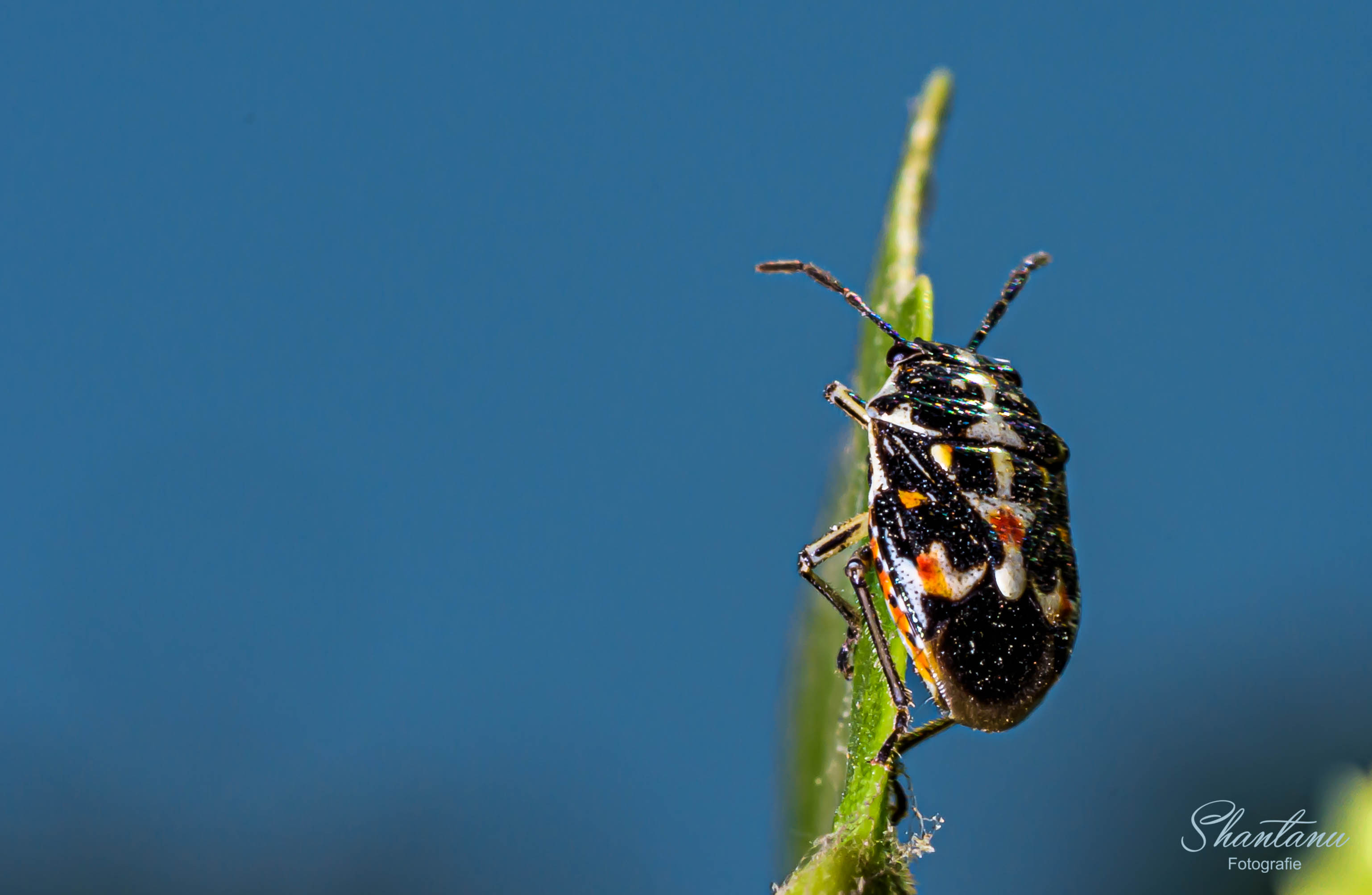
- Stenozygum speciosum

Scientific classification
- Kingdom: Animalia
- Phylum: Arthropoda
- Class: Insecta
- Order: Hemiptera
- Suborder: Heteroptera
- Family: Pentatomidae
- Subfamily: Pentatominae
- Tribe: Strachiini
- Genus: Stenozygum; Fieber, 1861

= Stenozygum =

Genus of true bugs

Stenozygum is a genus of stink bugs in the family Pentatomidae. It is widely distributed in Australian-Melanesian, Oriental, Palearctic and Ethiopian regions.

== Description ==
Species in the genus Stenozygum are associated with plants like Capparis, Medicago sativa, and Brassica campestris. The genus is differentiated based on the male genitalia. There are about 40 species across the tropical Palaearctic, Ethiopian, Oriental and Australian-Melanesian Regions. Two subgenera Stenozygum and Setozygum just are separated based on the whether the jugum is longer than the clypeus (the latter) and the presence of setae on the inner lobe of the pygophore.

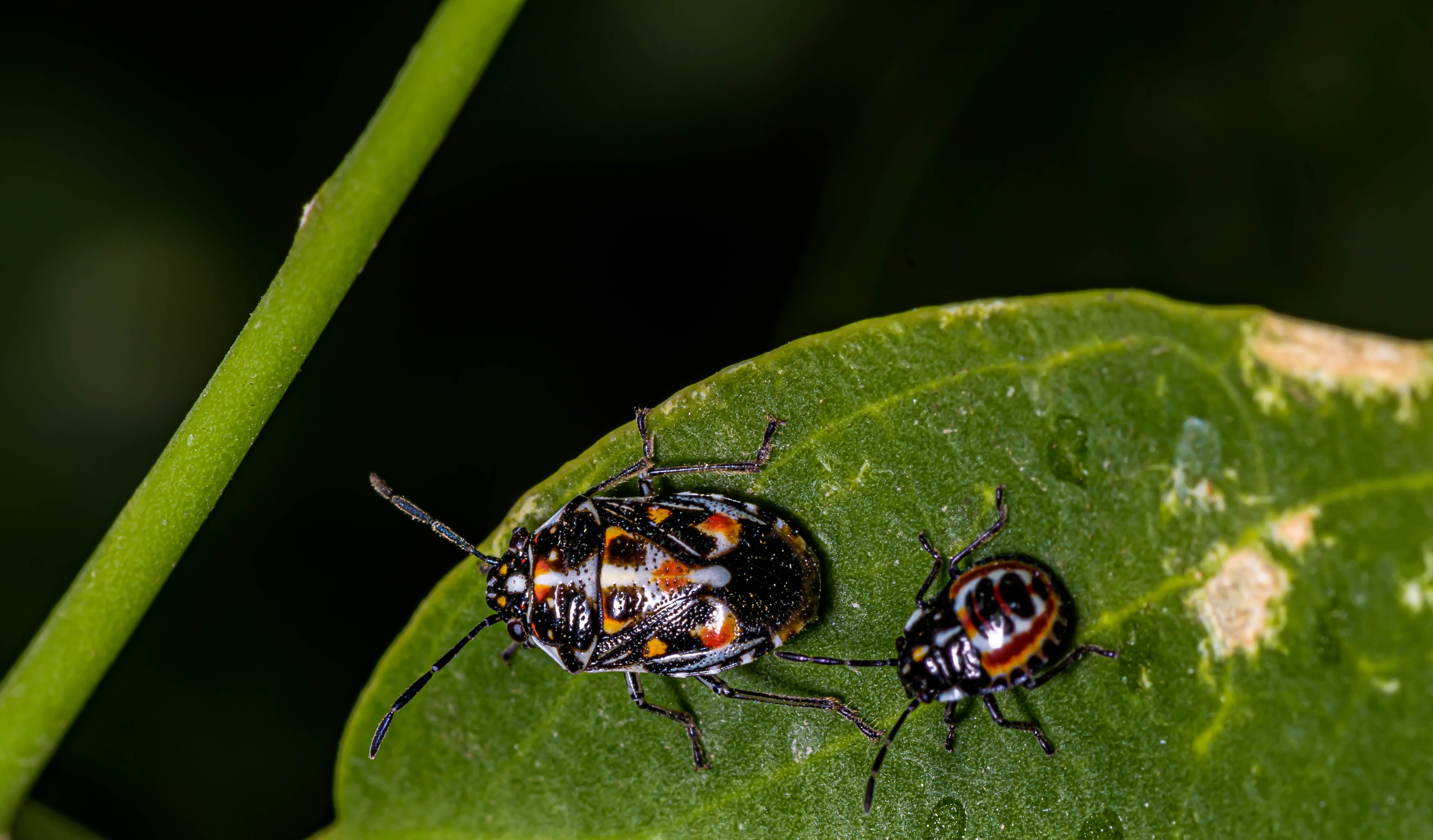
Nymph and adult of Stenozygum speciosum

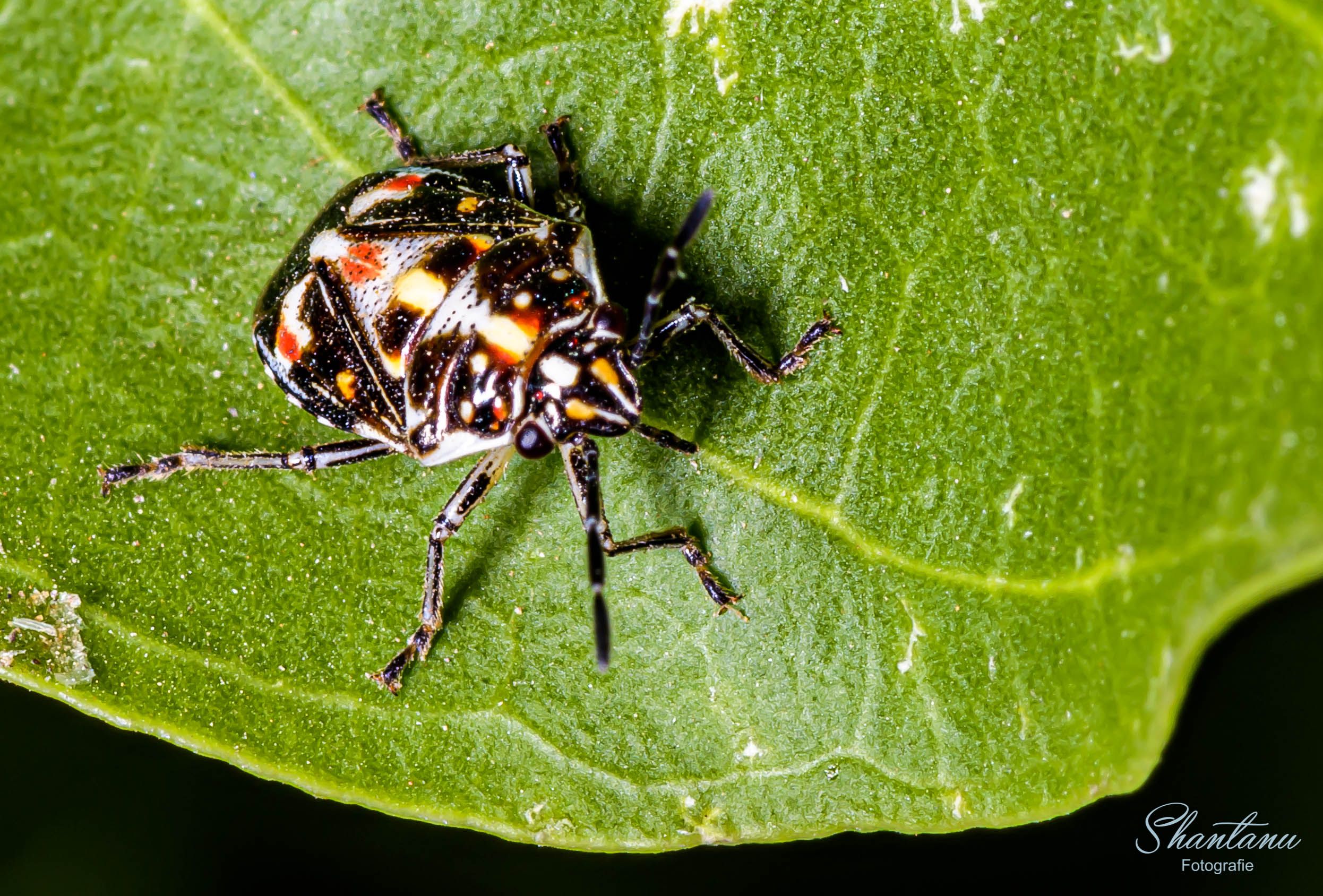
Nymph - Stenozygum speciosum

== Selected species ==
Subgenus Stenozygum

- Stenozygum alienatum
- Stenozygum coloratum (Klug, 1845)
- Stenozygum gemmeum (Walker, 1867) Indonesia
- Stenozygum ignitum
- Stenozygum jordiribesi Carapezza, 2011 - Socotra
- Stenozygum lepidum (Walker) Indonesia
- Stenozygum meridionale Gross Australia
- Stenozygum miniatulum Distant Australia
- Stenozygum pakistanense Gilgit, Pakistan
- Stenozygum speciosum (Dallas) India, Sindh and Punjab in Pakistan
- Stenozygum woodwardi Fiji

Subgenus Setozygum

- Stenozygum pseudospeciosum Ghauri, 1972 Pakistan
- Stenozygum constrictum Ahmad and Khan, 1983. - Punjab and Sindh Pakistan
