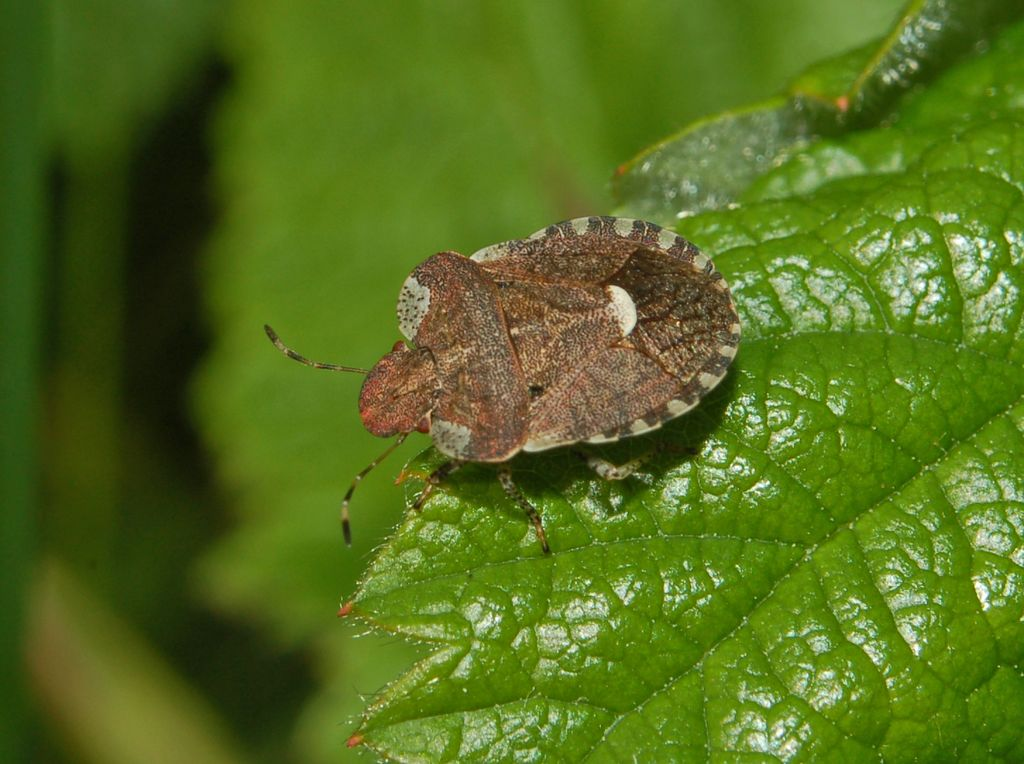

Scientific classification
- Domain: Eukaryota
- Kingdom: Animalia
- Phylum: Arthropoda
- Class: Insecta
- Order: Hemiptera
- Suborder: Heteroptera
- Family: Pentatomidae
- Subfamily: Pentatominae
- Tribe: Sciocorini
- Genus: Dyroderes; Spinola, 1837
- Species: D. umbraculatus

Binomial name
- Dyroderes umbraculatus (Fabricius, 1775)

= Dyroderes =

Species of true bug

Dyroderes umbraculatus is a shield bug belonging to the family Pentatomidae, subfamily Pentatominae. The species was first described by Johan Christian Fabricius in 1775.

The genus Dyroderes has one living representative, but BioLib also records one fossil species: †Dyroderes laticollis Piton, 1940.

D. umbraculatus mainly lives on Galium species and is found in Austria, the British Isles, Bulgaria, France, Greece, Hungary, Italy, Portugal, Spain and Switzerland.
