= Odmalea =

Scientific classification
- Kingdom: Animalia
- Phylum: Arthropoda
- Class: Insecta
- Order: Hemiptera
- Suborder: Heteroptera
- Family: Pentatomidae
- Subfamily: Pentatominae
- Tribe: Procleticini
- Genus: Odmalea; Bergroth, 1915

Genus of true bugs

Odmalea is a genus of stink bugs in the family Pentatomidae. There are at least four described species in Odmalea.

== Species ==
These four species belong to the genus Odmalea:

- Odmalea basalis Walker, 1867
- Odmalea concolor (Walker, 1867)
- Odmalea schaefferi (Barber, 1906)
- Odmalea vega Rolston
