= Dalpada =

- Dalpada oculata

Scientific classification
- Kingdom: Animalia
- Phylum: Arthropoda
- Clade: Pancrustacea
- Class: Insecta
- Order: Hemiptera
- Suborder: Heteroptera
- Family: Pentatomidae
- Subfamily: Pentatominae
- Tribe: Halyini
- Genus: Dalpada; Amyot & Serville, 1843

Synonyms
- Amasenoides Shiraki, 1913; Udana Walker, 1868

Genus of true bugs

Dalpada is a genus of mostly Asian shield bugs in the tribe Halyini, erected by Charles Jean-Baptiste Amyot and Jean Guillaume Audinet-Serville in 1843.

== Species ==
As of October 2026, BioLib includes the following:

subgenus Dalpada Amyot & Serville, 1843

1. Dalpada aspersa Amyot & Serville, 1843 - type species (by original monotypy)
2. Dalpada oculata (Fabricius, 1775)
3. Dalpada smaragdina (Walker, 1868)
4. Dalpada virescens (Shiraki, 1913)

subgenus Medenipa Ghauri, 1982

1. Dalpada latipes (Westwood, 1837)

not placed in a subgenus

1. Dalpada cinctipes Walker, 1867
2. Dalpada confusa Distant, 1879
3. Dalpada consinna Westwood, 1837
4. Dalpada distincta Hsiao & Cheng, 1977
5. Dalpada maculata Hsiao & Cheng, 1977
6. Dalpada neoclavata Rider, 1998
7. Dalpada nigricollis (Westwood, 1837)
8. Dalpada nodifera Walker, 1867
9. Dalpada perelegans Breddin, 1904

"Dalpada crux"
