= Brepholoxa =

Scientific classification
- Kingdom: Animalia
- Phylum: Arthropoda
- Class: Insecta
- Order: Hemiptera
- Suborder: Heteroptera
- Family: Pentatomidae
- Subfamily: Pentatominae
- Tribe: Procleticini
- Genus: Brepholoxa; Van Duzee, 1904

Genus of true bugs

Brepholoxa is a genus of stink bugs in the family Pentatomidae. There is one described species in Brepholoxa, B. heidemanni.
