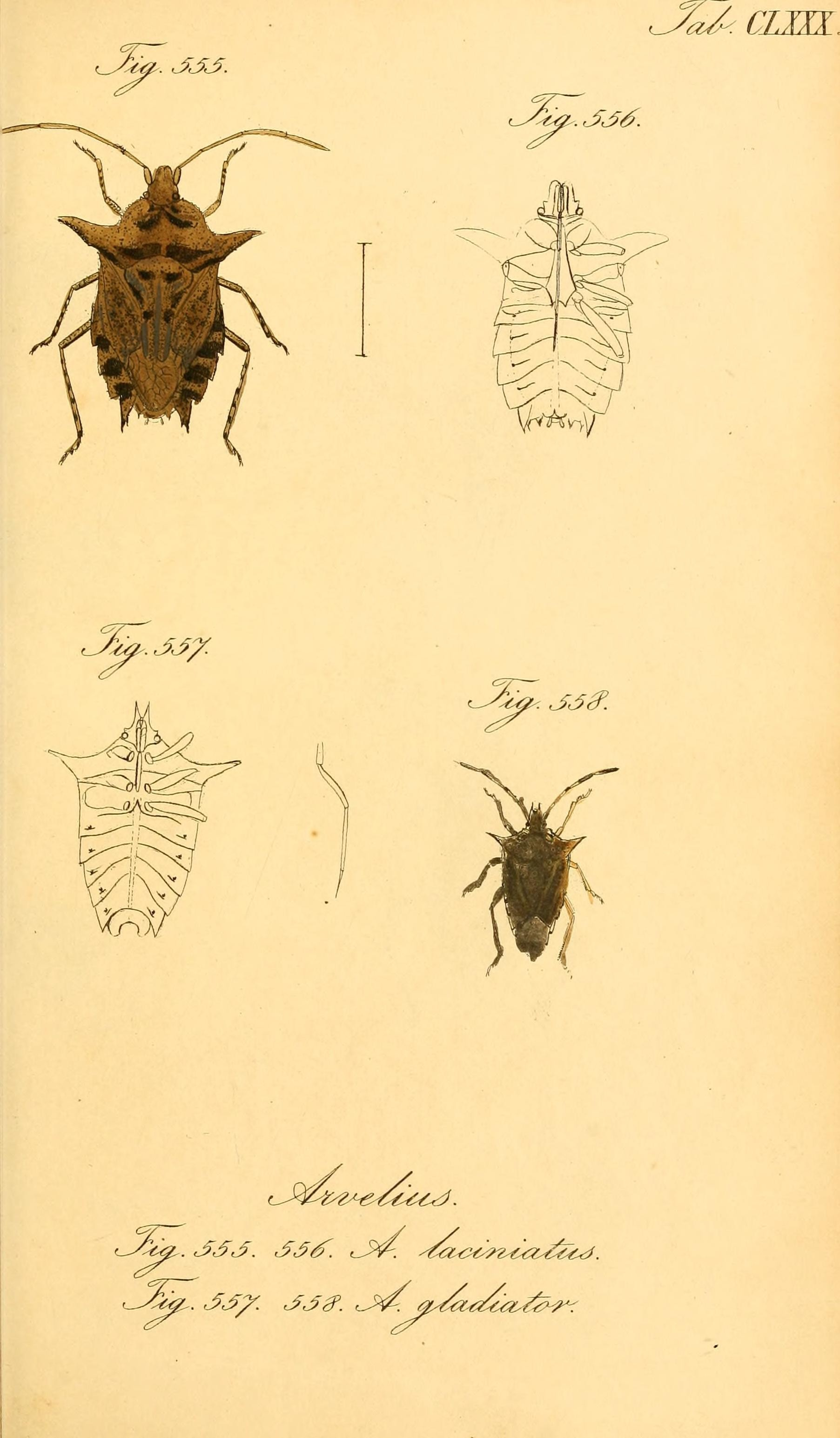
- A. laciniatus (top) and A. gladiator (bottom) by C.W. Hahn

Scientific classification
- Kingdom: Animalia
- Phylum: Arthropoda
- Clade: Pancrustacea
- Class: Insecta
- Order: Hemiptera
- Suborder: Heteroptera
- Family: Pentatomidae
- Subfamily: Pentatominae
- Tribe: Chlorocorini
- Genus: Arvelius; Spinola, 1840

= Arvelius =

Genus of true bugs

Arvelius is a genus of stink bugs in the family Pentatomidae. Described species of Arvelius have been recorded from the Americas.

== Species ==
These 13 species belong to the genus Arvelius:

- Arvelius acutispinus Breddin, 1909
- Arvelius albopunctatus (De Geer, 1773) (tomato stink bug)
- Arvelius caballeroi Brailovsky
- Arvelius confusus Brailovsky
- Arvelius ecuadorensis Brailovsky
- Arvelius haitiana Brailovsky
- Arvelius intermediata Brailovsky
- Arvelius latus Breddin, 1909
- Arvelius longirostris Brailovsky, 1981
- Arvelius nigroantennatus Brailovsky
- Arvelius paralongirostris Brailovsky
- Arvelius peruana Brailovsky
- Arvelius porrectispinus Breddin, 1909
