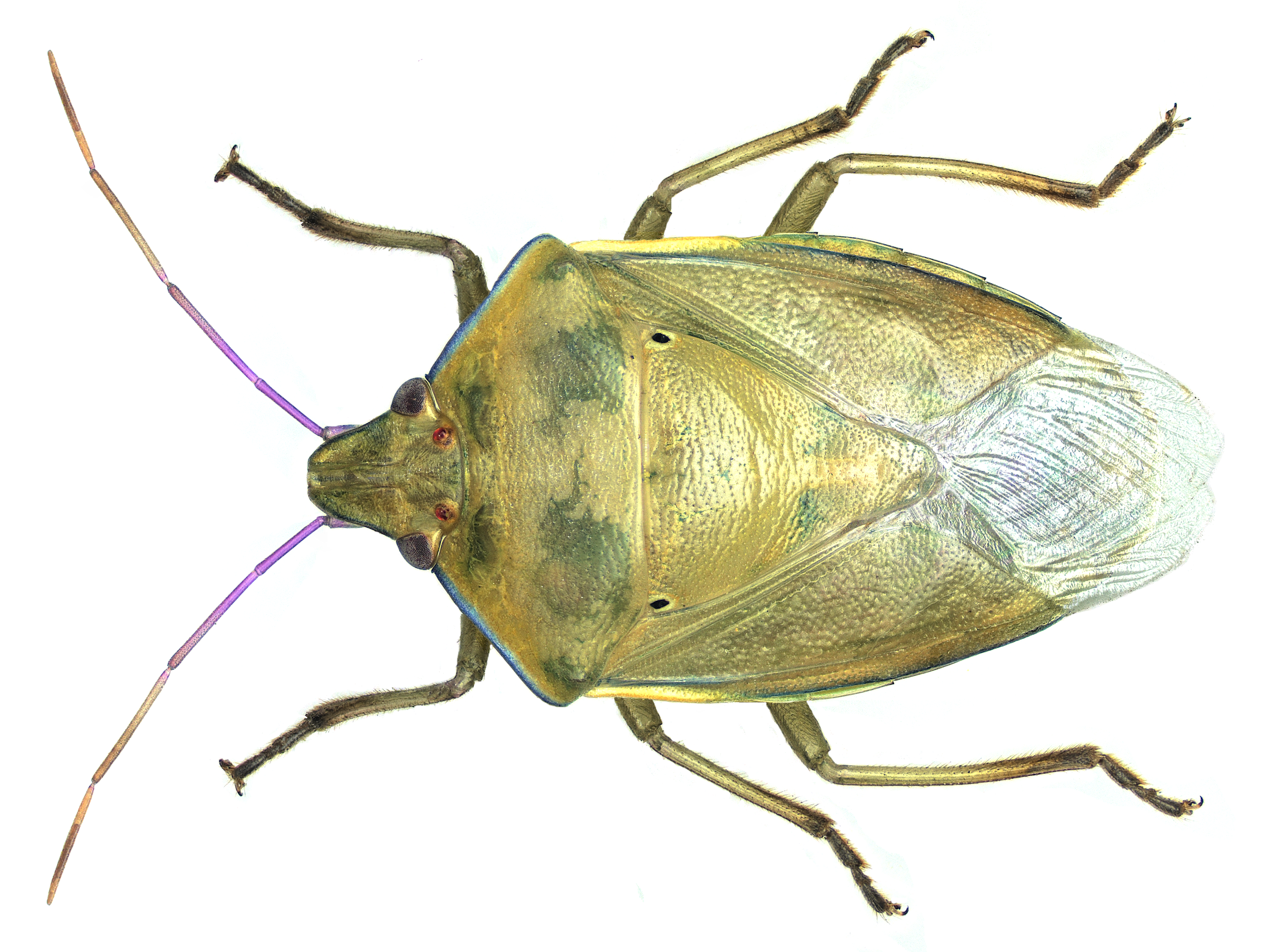
- Bathycoelia indica

Scientific classification
- Kingdom: Animalia
- Phylum: Arthropoda
- Class: Insecta
- Order: Hemiptera
- Suborder: Heteroptera
- Family: Pentatomidae
- Subfamily: Pentatominae
- Genus: Bathycoelia; Amyot & Serville, 1843

Synonyms
- Gastraulax Herrich-Schäffer, 1844; Jurtina Stål, 1868

= Bathycoelia =

Genus of shield bugs

Bathycoelia is a genus of shield bugs in the subfamily Pentatominae and the monotypic tribe Bathycoeliini.

== Species ==
The North Dakota State University lists the following and provides a key to West African species:

1. Bathycoelia alkyone Linnavuori, 1989
2. Bathycoelia bifoveolatus (Reuter, 1887)
3. Bathycoelia bipunctulus (Stål, 1876)
4. Bathycoelia boliviensis Jensen-Haarup, 1937
5. Bathycoelia buonopoziensis (Palisot de Beauvois, 1807)
  - type species (as Pentatoma buonopoziensis Palisot de Beauvois)
6. Bathycoelia cascadea Roche, 1977
7. Bathycoelia chlorospila Walker, 1867
8. Bathycoelia christyi Schouteden, 1916
9. Bathycoelia conferenda Bergroth, 1891
10. Bathycoelia cuneifera Bergroth, 1913
11. Bathycoelia cythereia Linnavuori, 1974
12. Bathycoelia decellei Schouteden, 1964
13. Bathycoelia distincta Distant, 1878
14. Bathycoelia dubia Jensen-Haarup, 1931
15. Bathycoelia flavolimbata China, 1924
16. Bathycoelia fleuria Roche, 1977
17. Bathycoelia horvathi Schouteden, 1964
18. Bathycoelia indica Dallas, 1851
19. Bathycoelia longirostris Montrouzier, 1861
20. Bathycoelia madagascariensis Reuter, 1887
21. Bathycoelia malachitica Horváth, 1904
22. Bathycoelia nesophila Horváth, 1904
23. Bathycoelia ovalis Stål, 1865
24. Bathycoelia praelongirostris Bergroth, 1893
25. Bathycoelia rodhaini Schouteden, 1913
26. Bathycoelia rugifossa Bergroth, 1913
27. Bathycoelia scutellata Zheng & Liu, 1987
28. Bathycoelia simmondsi (Izzard, 1932)
29. Bathycoelia sinica Zheng & Liu, 1987
30. Bathycoelia thalassina (Herrich-Schäffer, 1844)
31. Bathycoelia torquatus (Herrich-Schäffer, 1844)
32. Bathycoelia variolaria Distant, 1912
