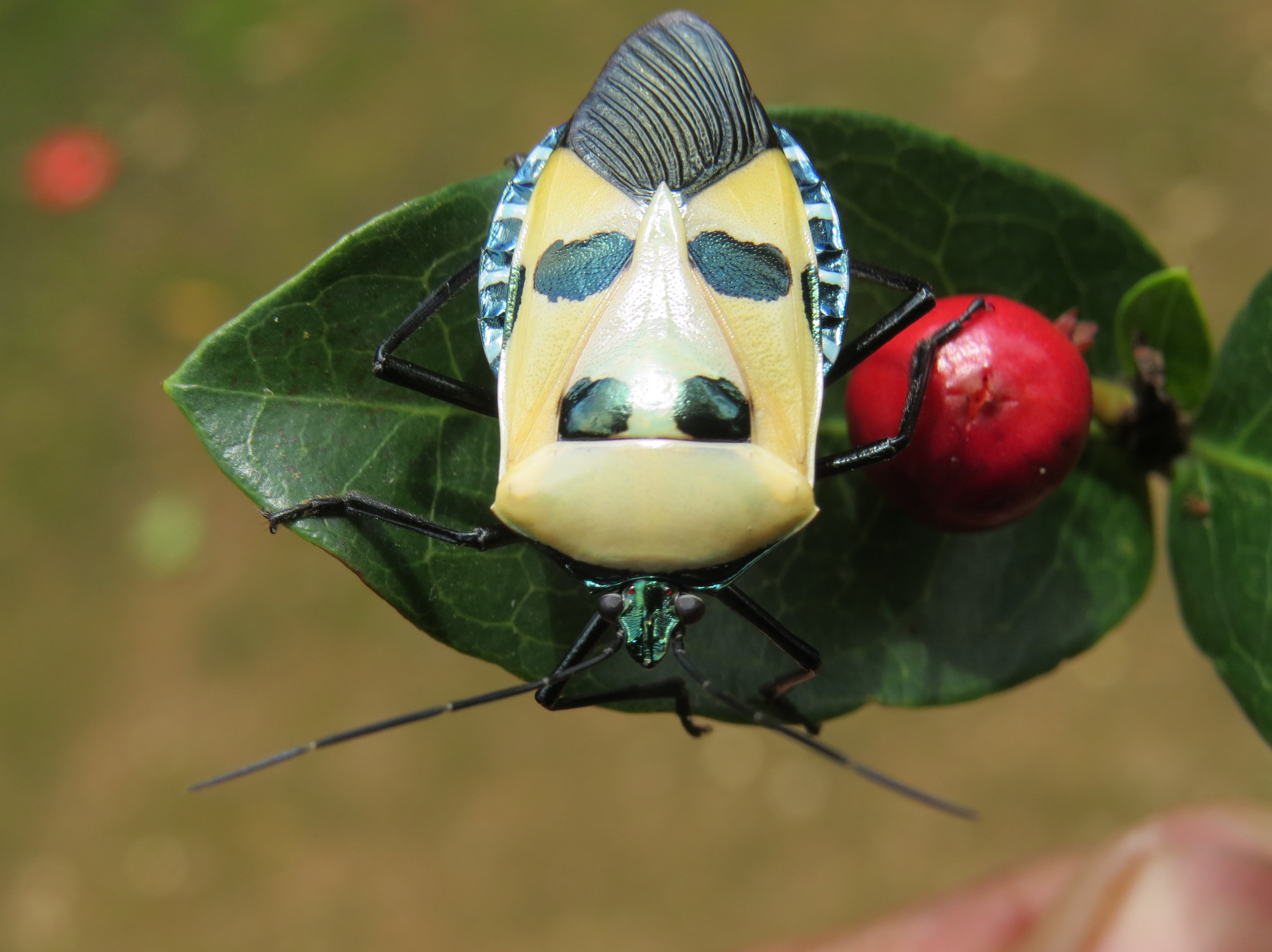
- Catacanthus incarnatus

Scientific classification
- Kingdom: Animalia
- Phylum: Arthropoda
- Class: Insecta
- Order: Hemiptera
- Suborder: Heteroptera
- Family: Pentatomidae
- Subfamily: Pentatominae
- Tribe: Catacanthini
- Genus: Catacanthus; Spinola, 1837

= Catacanthus =

Genus of true bugs

Catacanthus ("having downward-pointing thorns") is a genus of insects within the family Pentatomidae. The insects belonging to this genus are found in Madagascar, India, Sri Lanka, Myanmar, Thailand, China, Indonesia, Malaysia, Philippines, Papua New Guinea, New Caledonia, Japan and South Korea.

The back of the man-faced stink bug (Catacanthus incarnatus) has been noted by entomologists to resemble Elvis Presley.

== Species ==
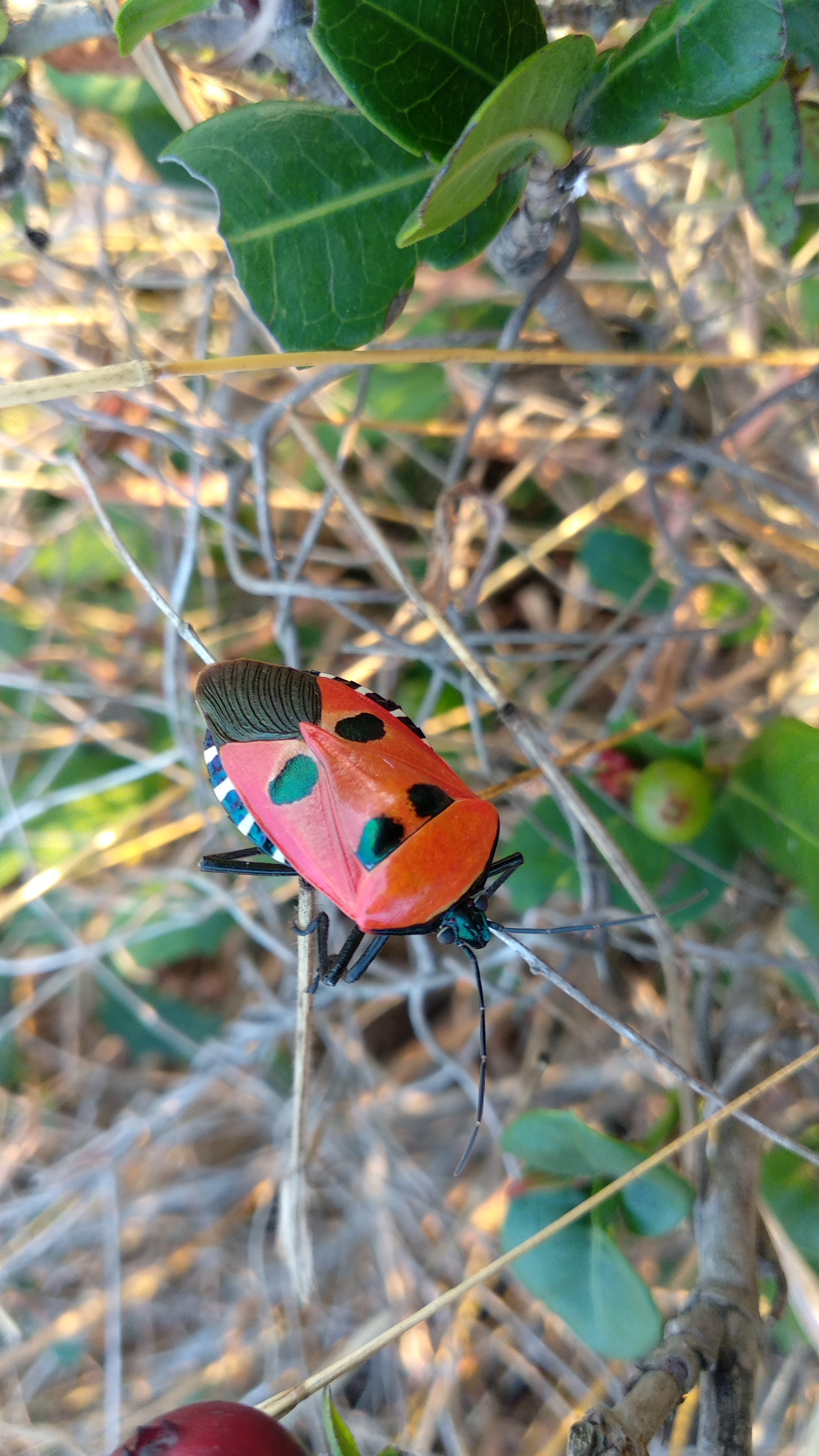
Catacanthus incarnatus on Ixora plant

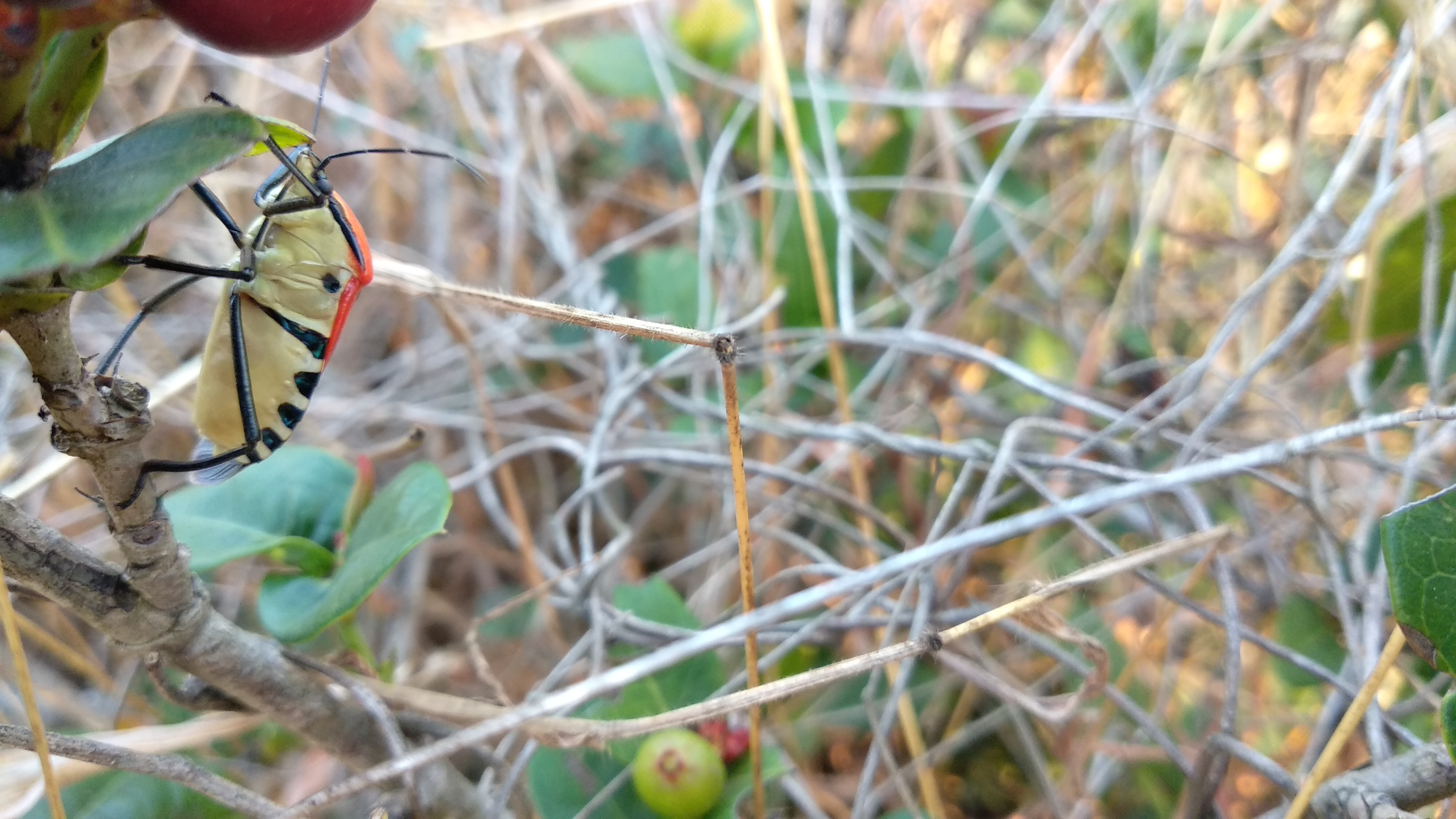
Catacanthus incarnatus Side view

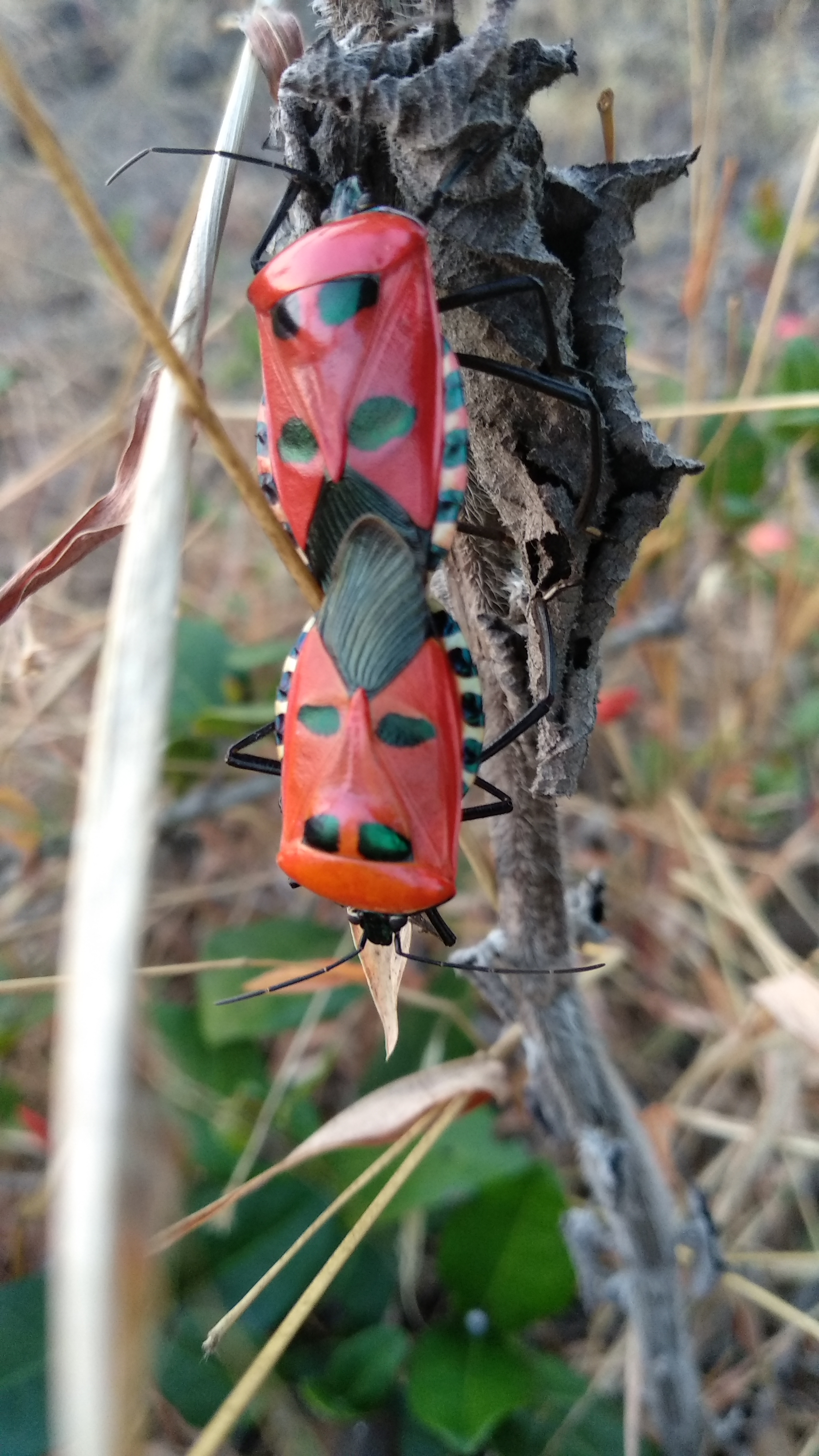
Mating dorsal view

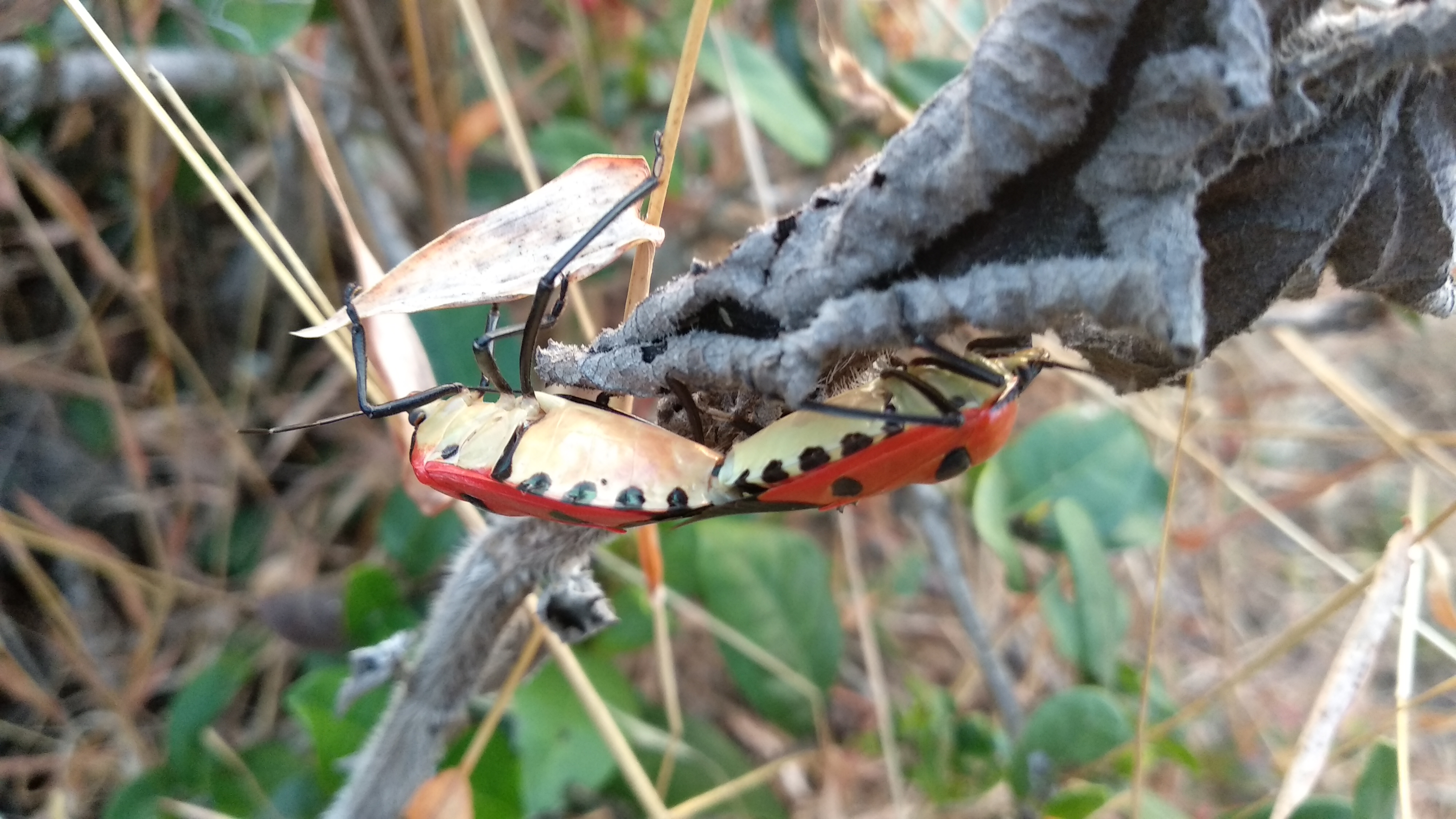
Mating

Species include:

Species	Other names	Binomial authority	Year
Catacanthus carrenoi	Cermatulus pulcher, Pentatoma tricolor, Rhaphigaster carrenoi	Le Guillou	1841
Catacanthus eximius		Edward Payson Van Duzee	1937
Catacanthus fuchsinus		H. Ruckes	1963
Catacanthus grossi		I. Ahmad & S. Kamaluddin	1981
Catacanthus horni		Gustav Breddin	1909
Catacanthus immaculatus		Lucien Francois Lethierry & Guillaume Severin	1893
Catacanthus incarnatus	Man-faced stink bug, Cimex aurantius, Cimex incarnatus, Cimex melanopus, Cimex nigripes	Dru Drury	1773
Catacanthus mirabilis		William Lucas Distant	1901
Catacanthus mohleri		Ahmad, Siddiqui & Kamaluddin	1998
Catacanthus punctus	Catacanthus punctum, Cimex punctum	Johan Christian Fabricius	1787
Catacanthus reuteri		Henri Schouteden	1905
Catacanthus sumptuosus		Carl August Dohrn	1863
Catacanthus taiti		William Lucas Distant	1913
Catacanthus violarius		Carl Stål	1876
Catacanthus viridicatus		William Lucas Distant	1881
