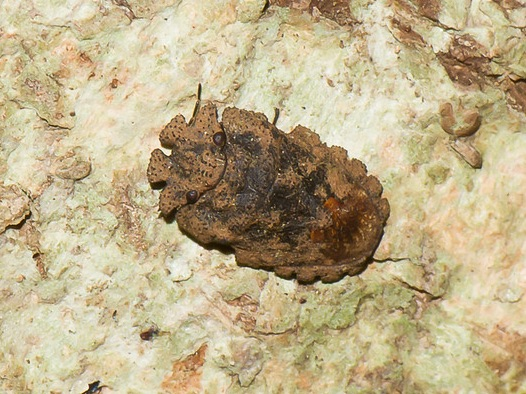
- Serbana borneensis in Malaysia

Scientific classification
- Kingdom: Animalia
- Phylum: Arthropoda
- Class: Insecta
- Order: Hemiptera
- Suborder: Heteroptera
- Family: Pentatomidae
- Subfamily: Serbaninae; Leston, 1953
- Genus: Serbana; Distant, 1906
- Species: S. borneensis

Binomial name
- Serbana borneensis Distant, 1906

= Serbana =

Species of true bug

The Serbaninae are a highly modified subfamily of Pentatomidae, containing only a single known species, Serbana borneensis. It is known from very few specimens, from Malaysia and Borneo, and was originally described in the family Phloeidae, a group known only from South America, then later reclassified as a pentatomid.
