= Acesines (bug) =

Scientific classification
- Domain: Eukaryota
- Kingdom: Animalia
- Phylum: Arthropoda
- Class: Insecta
- Order: Hemiptera
- Suborder: Heteroptera
- Family: Pentatomidae
- Subfamily: Pentatominae
- Tribe: Axiagastini
- Genus: Acesines; Stål, 1876

Genus of shield bugs

External image
- Image at iNaturalist

Acesines is a genus of Indian shield-bugs in the subfamily Pentatominae (tribe Axiagastini) erected by Carl Stål in 1876.

== Species ==
BioLib includes:

1. Acesines bambusana Distant, 1918
2. Acesines breviceps Stål, 1876
3. Acesines sordida (Kirby, 1891)
