= Geomorpha (bug) =

Scientific classification
- Kingdom: Animalia
- Phylum: Arthropoda
- Clade: Pancrustacea
- Class: Insecta
- Order: Hemiptera
- Suborder: Heteroptera
- Family: Pentatomidae
- Subfamily: Pentatominae
- Tribe: Aeschrocorini
- Genus: Geomorpha; Bergroth, 1893

Genus of bugs

External image
- Images at iNaturalist

Geomorpha is a genus of African bugs in the subfamily Pentatominae (tribe Aeschrocorini), erected by Ernst Evald Bergroth in 1893.

== Species ==
BioLib lists:

1. Geomorpha junodi Distant, 1904
2. Geomorpha lujai Schouteden, 1917
3. Geomorpha tuberculosa Bergroth, 1893 - type species
