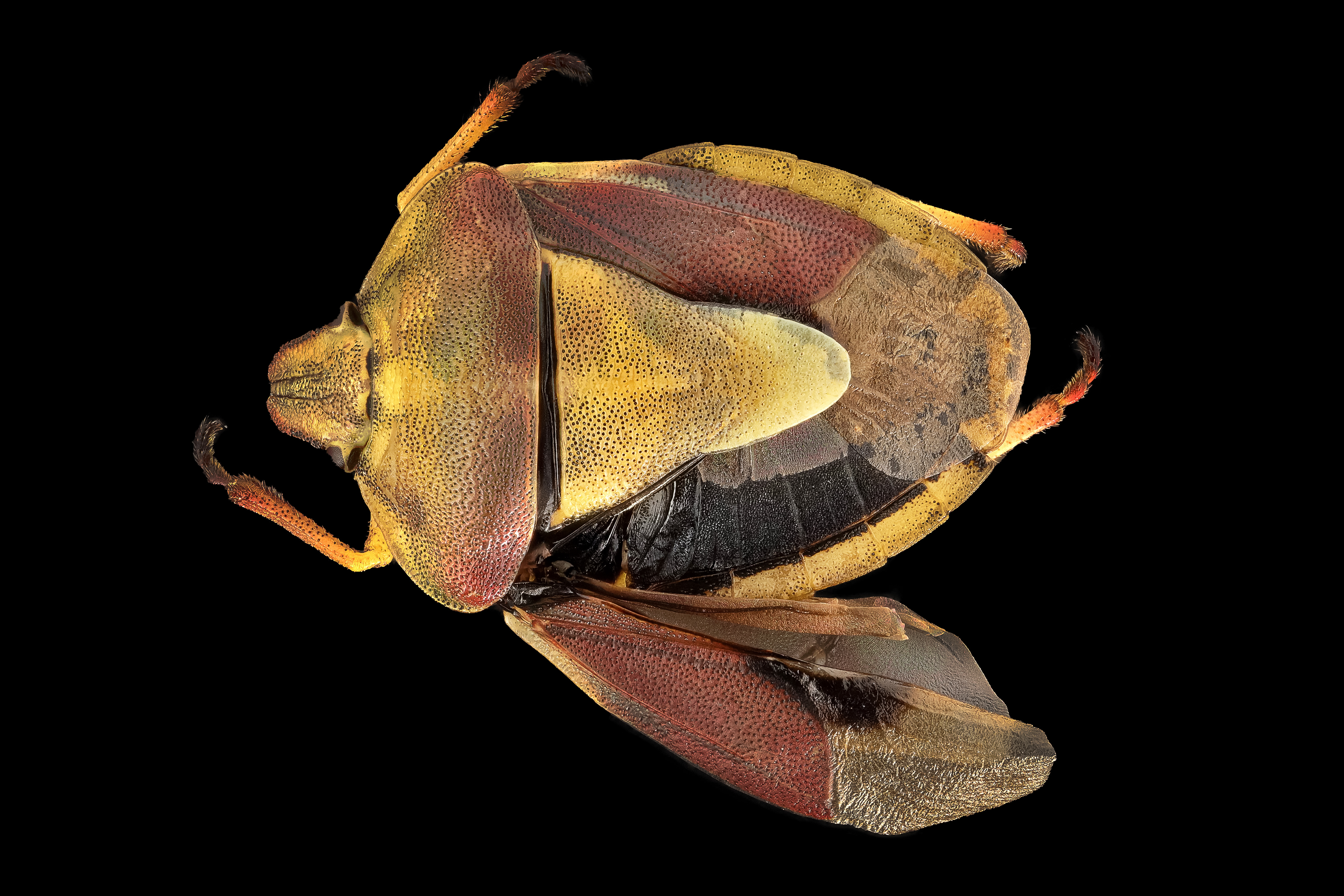
- Antheminia remota, Yellowstone National Park

Scientific classification
- Domain: Eukaryota
- Kingdom: Animalia
- Phylum: Arthropoda
- Class: Insecta
- Order: Hemiptera
- Suborder: Heteroptera
- Family: Pentatomidae
- Subfamily: Pentatominae
- Tribe: Carpocorini
- Genus: Antheminia; Mulsant & Rey, 1866

= Antheminia =

Genus of true bugs

Antheminia is a genus of true bugs belonging to the family Pentatomidae.

The genus was first described by Mulsant and Rey in 1866.

The species of this genus are found in Europe, Northern America, Japan.

== Species ==
These species belong to the genus Antheminia:

- Antheminia aliena (Reuter, 1891)
- Antheminia eurynota
- Antheminia lunulata (Goeze, 1778)
- Antheminia pusio (Kolenati, 1846)
- Antheminia remota
- Antheminia sulcata
- Antheminia varicornis (Jakovlev, 1874)
