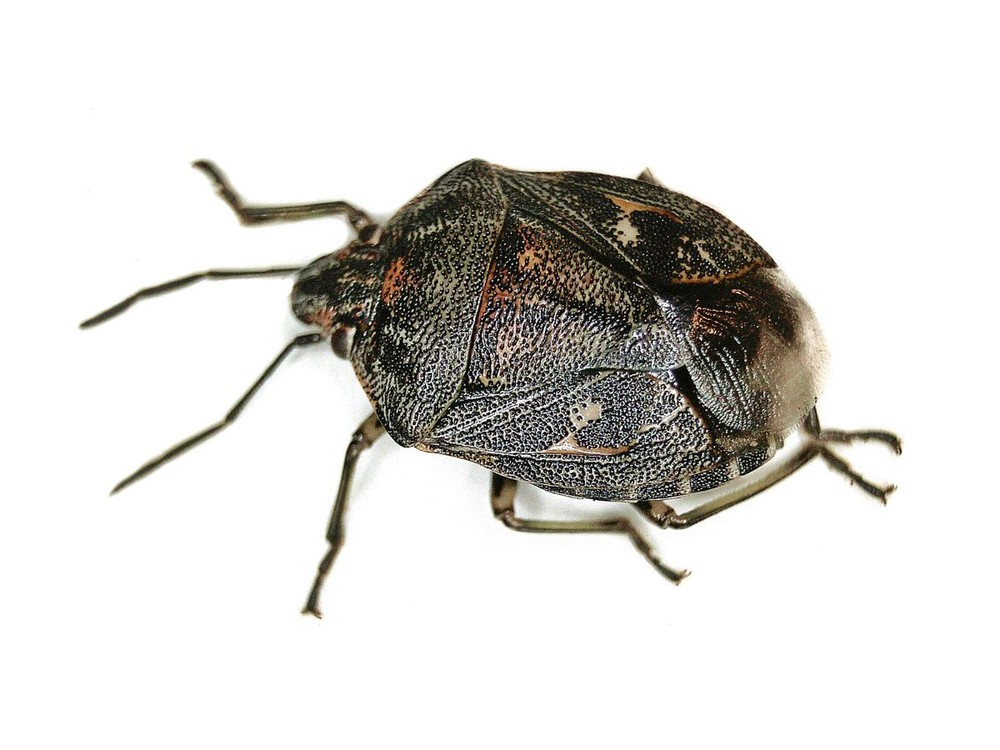
- Holcogaster fibulata

Scientific classification
- Domain: Eukaryota
- Kingdom: Animalia
- Phylum: Arthropoda
- Class: Insecta
- Order: Hemiptera
- Suborder: Heteroptera
- Family: Pentatomidae
- Subfamily: Pentatominae
- Genus: Holcogaster; Fieber, 1861

Synonyms
- Aulacetrus Mulsant & Rey, 1866

= Holcogaster =

Genus of true bugs

External image
- Images at iNaturalist

Holcogaster is a genus of mostly Palearctic shield-bugs in the subfamily Pentatominae erected by Franz Xaver Fieber in 1861. Some authorities place this genus in the tribe Carpocorini while others suggest a monotypic tribe Aulacetrini (based on the synonym Aulacetrus). The type species H. fibulata, has been recorded from mainland Europe (not the British Isles or Scandinavia).

== Species ==
BioLib includes:

- Holcogaster exilis Horváth, 1903
- Holcogaster fibulata (Germar, 1831)
- Holcogaster longicornis Wagner, 1955
- Holcogaster weberi Wagner, 1964
