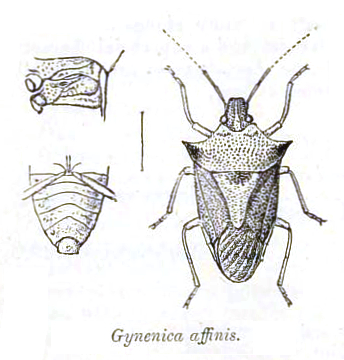
- Gynenica affinis

Scientific classification
- Domain: Eukaryota
- Kingdom: Animalia
- Phylum: Arthropoda
- Class: Insecta
- Order: Hemiptera
- Suborder: Heteroptera
- Family: Pentatomidae
- Tribe: Lestonocorini
- Genus: Gynenica; Dallas, 1851

Type species
- Gynenica marginella Dallas, 1851

Synonyms
- Gastroxys Horváth, 1904

= Gynenica =

Genus of insects

Gynenica is a genus of stink bug with about fourteen species in the Afrotropical and Oriental regions. It is one of four genera placed in the tribe Lestonocorini along with Lestonocoris, Neogynenica, and Umgababa that occur in Africa and India and feed on plants in the family Acanthaceae. Bugs in the genus have the pronotum tips extended into forward and upward curving spines. The scutellum is longer than broad, the apex with a rounded point and not reaching beyond the middle of the abdomen.

Species in the genus include:

- Gynenica affinis Distant, 1880
- Gynenica alami Shafee & Azim, 1984
- Gynenica basilewskyi Leston, 1953
- Gynenica capeneri Leston, 1953
- Gynenica carayoni Leston, 1952
- Gynenica chinai Schouteden, 1958
- Gynenica funerea (Horvath, 1904)
- Gynenica ghaurii Mathew, 1980
- Gynenica kavirondo Jeannel, 1914
- Gynenica malaisi Leston, 1953
- Gynenica marginella Dallas, 1851
- Gynenica occidentalis Schouteden, 1964
- Gynenica rustica Distant, 1899
- Gynenica tellini Schouteden, 1905
- Gynenica vicaria Linnavuori, 1989
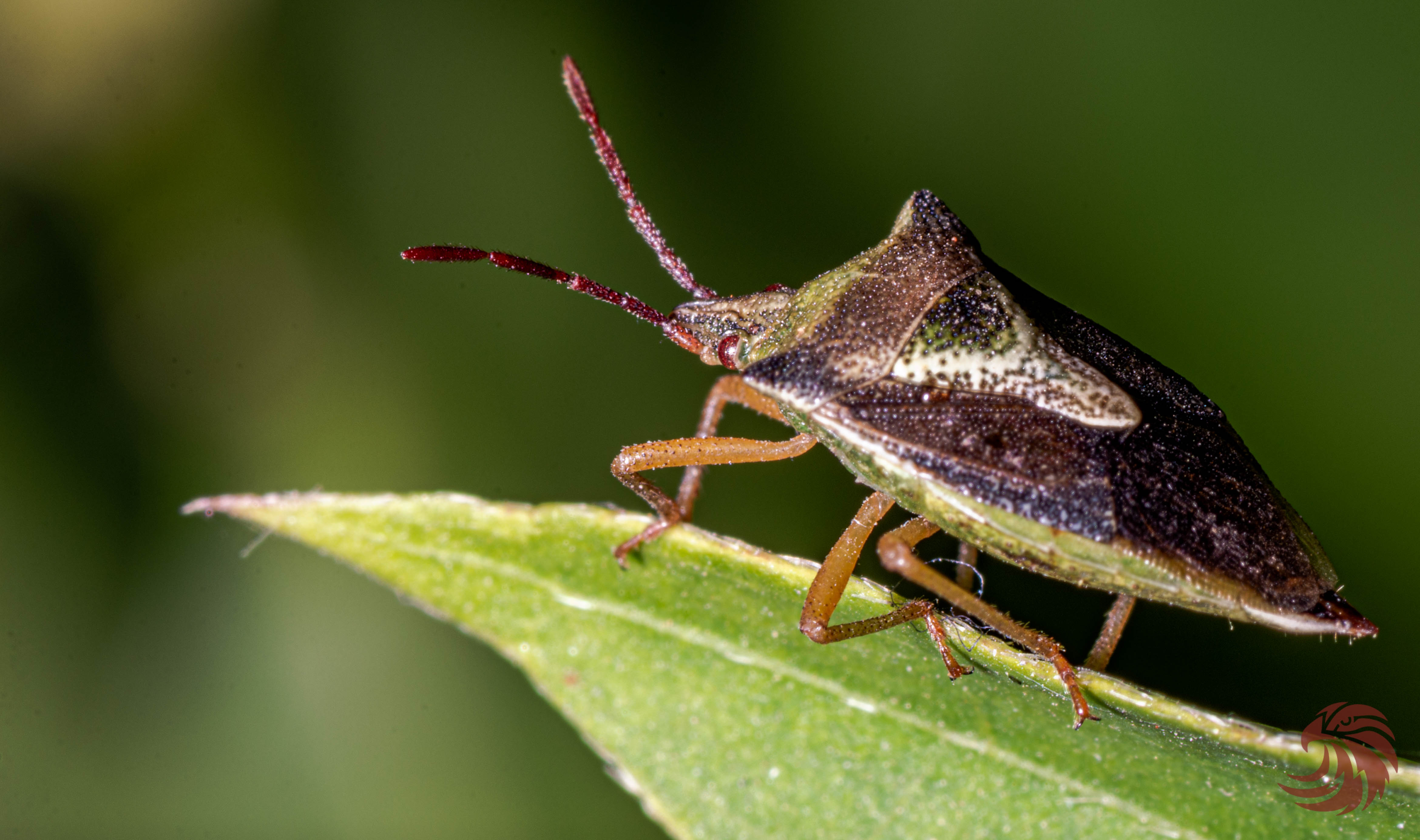
Gynenica sp., adult

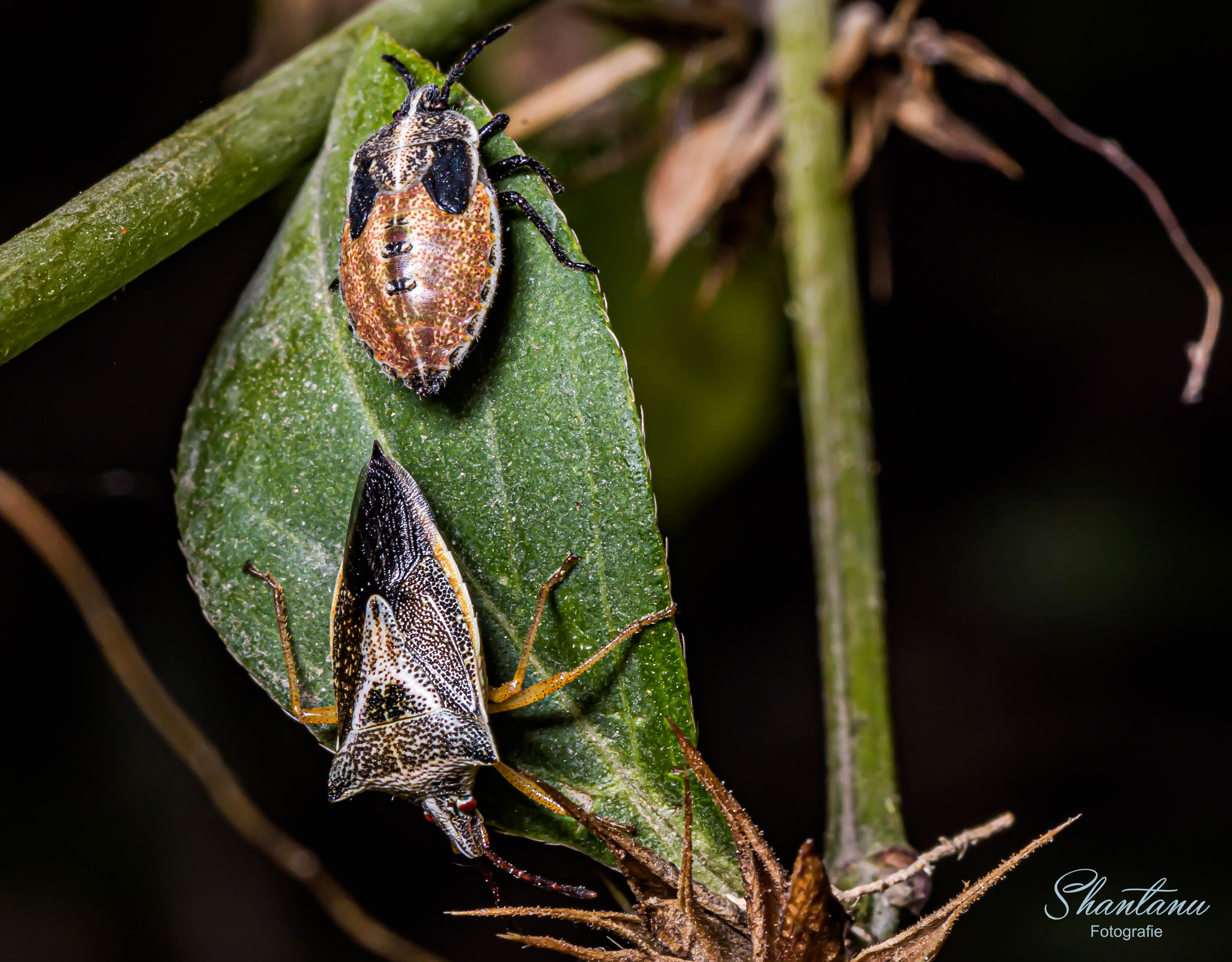
Gynenica sp. nymph and adult

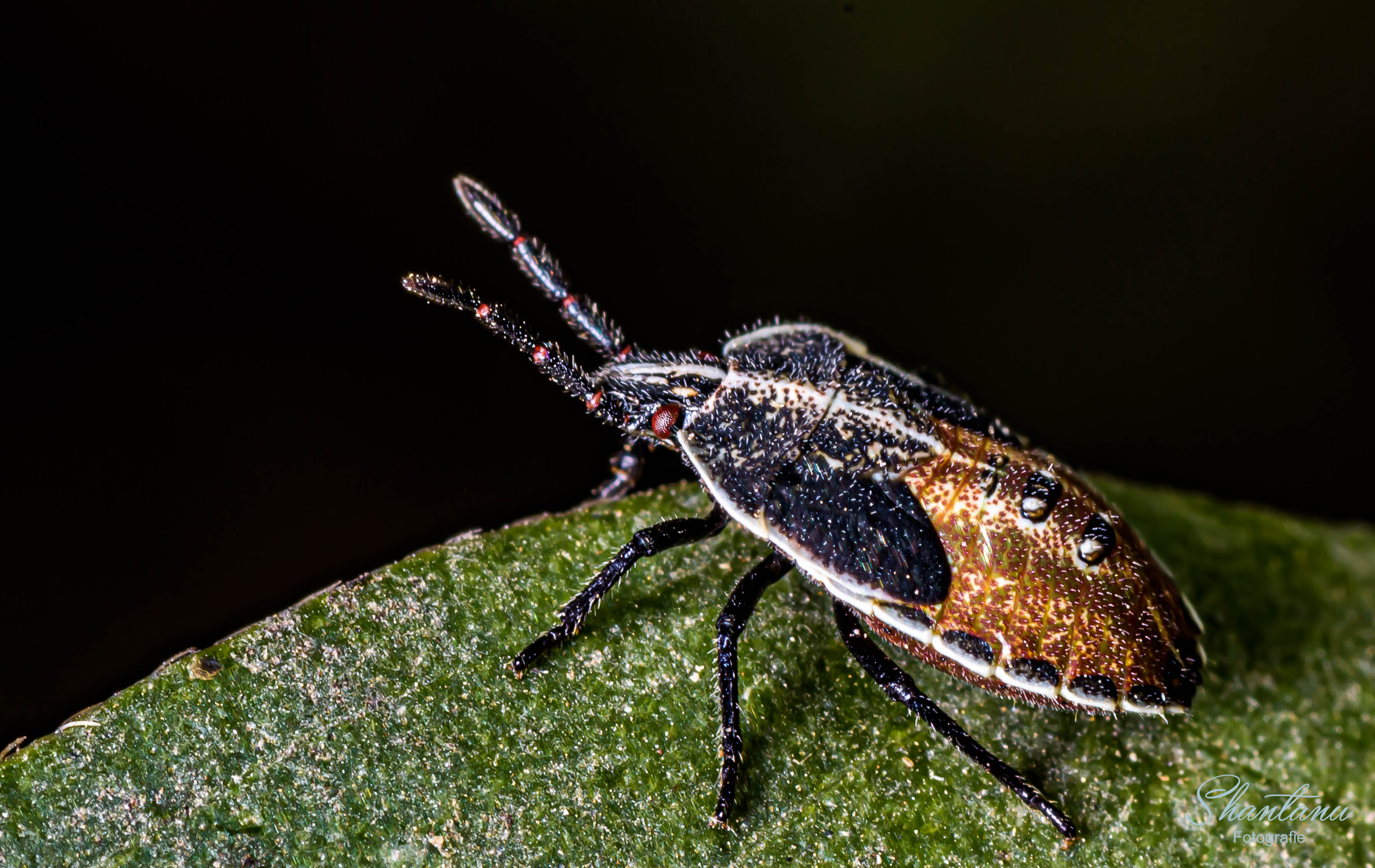
Gynenica sp. nymph

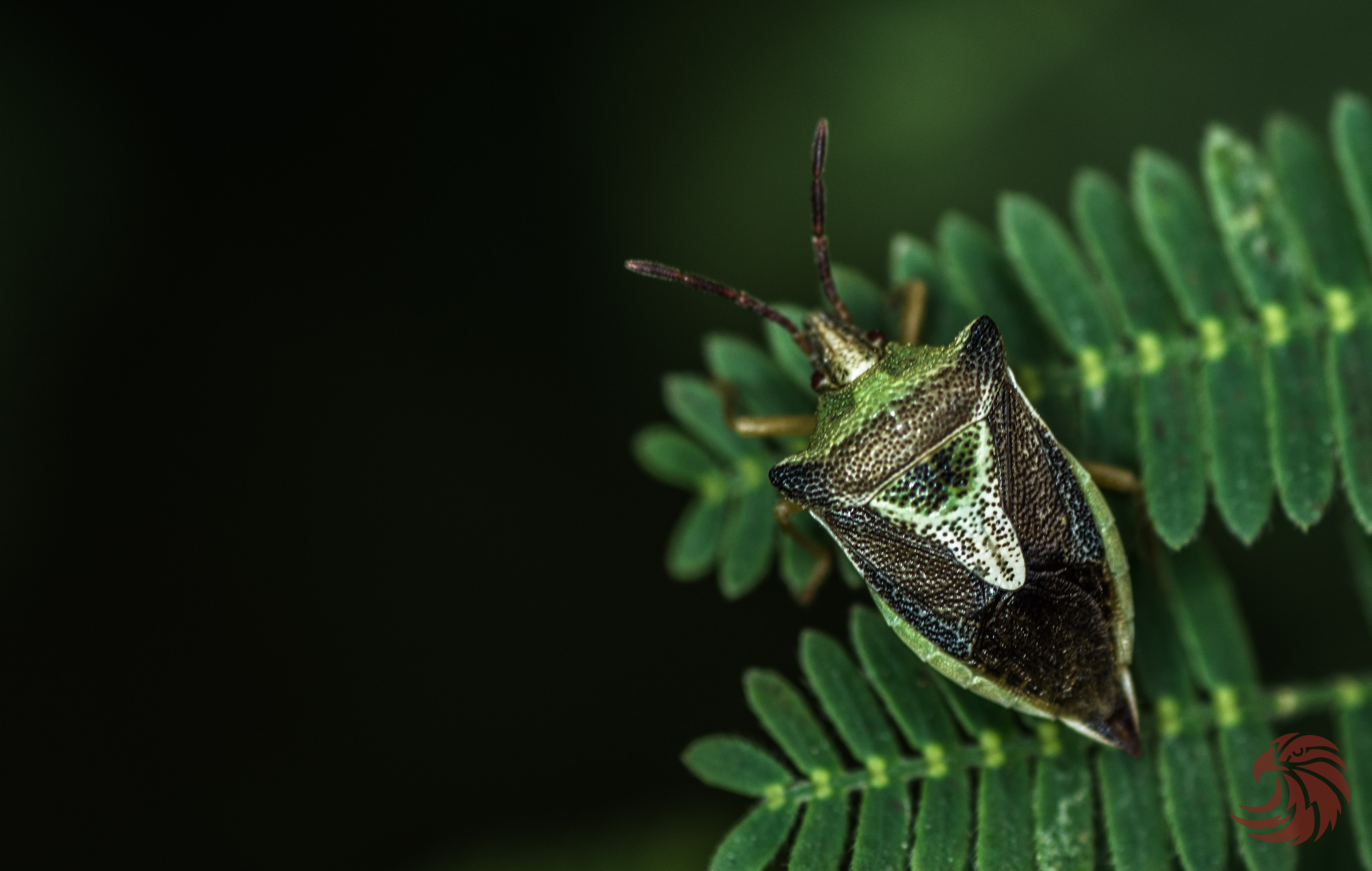
Adult Gynenica sp.
