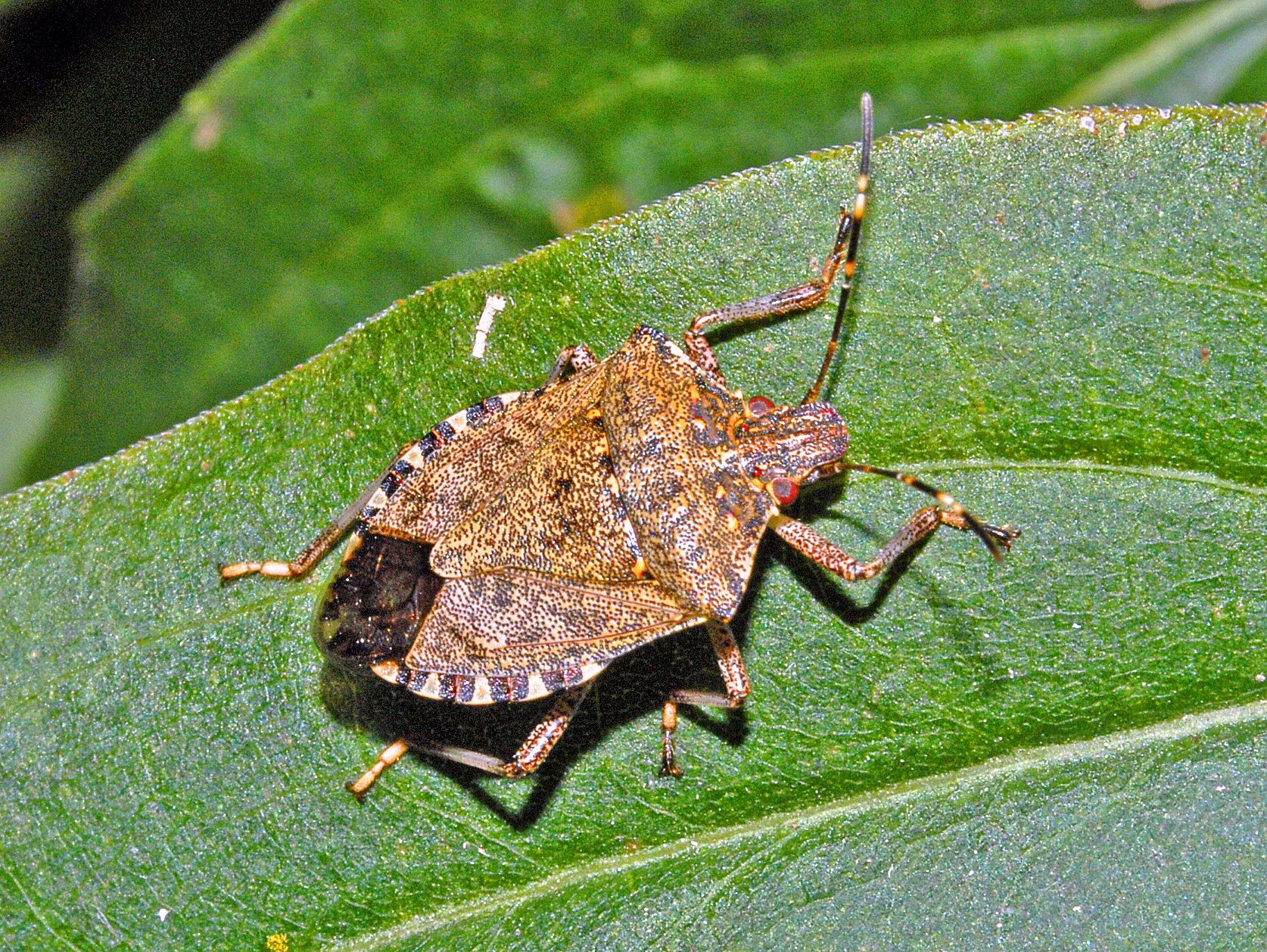
- Halyomorpha halys

Scientific classification
- Kingdom: Animalia
- Phylum: Arthropoda
- Clade: Pancrustacea
- Class: Insecta
- Order: Hemiptera
- Suborder: Heteroptera
- Family: Pentatomidae
- Subfamily: Pentatominae
- Tribe: Cappaeini
- Genus: Halyomorpha; Mayr, 1864

Type species
- Pentatoma halys Stål, 1855

= Halyomorpha =

Genus of true bugs

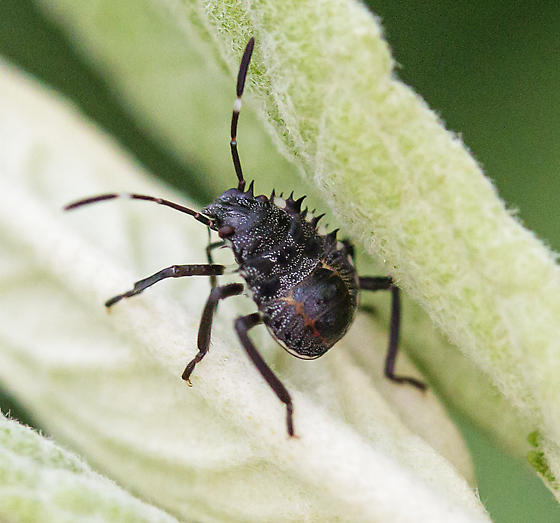
Brown Marmorated Stink Bug (Halyomorpha halys) nymph

Halyomorpha is a genus of shield bugs in the subfamily Pentatominae and tribe Cappaeini, erected by G. Mayr. This genus probably has an Asian centre of origin, but Halyomorpha halys, the brown marmorated stink bug, is an invasive species with a world-wide distribution.

== Species ==
Species within this genus include:

- Halyomorpha angusticeps Bergroth, 1914
- Halyomorpha angustisecta Linnavuori, 1982
- Halyomorpha annulicornis (Signoret, 1858)
- Halyomorpha azhari Ahmad & Zaidi, 1989
- Halyomorpha bimaculata Bergroth, 1892
- Halyomorpha canalana Distant, 1914
- Halyomorpha capneri Leston, 1952
- Halyomorpha carmona Linnavuori, 1982
- Halyomorpha distanti Jeannel, 1913
- Halyomorpha fletcheri Distant, 1918
- Halyomorpha guttula (Ellenrieder, 1862)
- Halyomorpha halys (Stål, 1855) – brown marmorated stink bug
- Halyomorpha hasani Rider & Rolston, 1995
- Halyomorpha illuminata Distant, 1911
- Halyomorpha javanica Hasan, 1993
- Halyomorpha lata Breddin, 1899
- Halyomorpha leopoldi Schouteden, 1903
- Halyomorpha longiceps Breddin, 1900
- Halyomorpha malleata (Distant, 1890)
- Halyomorpha mayumbeensis Villiers, 1967
- Halyomorpha murrea Distant, 1887
- Halyomorpha ornativentris Breddin, 1900
- Halyomorpha philippina Black, 1968
- Halyomorpha picoides Linnavuori, 1975
- Halyomorpha picticornis Bergroth, 1915
- Halyomorpha picus (Fabricius, 1794)
- Halyomorpha punctata Cachan, 1952
- Halyomorpha punjabensis Ahmad & Kamaluddin, 1977
- Halyomorpha reflexa (Signoret, 1858)
- Halyomorpha rugosa Schouteden, 1913
- Halyomorpha schoutedeni Bergroth, 1913
- Halyomorpha scutellata Distant, 1879
- Halyomorpha seyidiensis Jeannel, 1913
- Halyomorpha sinuata Hasan, 1993
- Halyomorpha viridescens (Walker, 1867)
- Halyomorpha viridinigra Breddin, 1901
- Halyomorpha yasumatsui Abbasi & Ahmad, 1974
