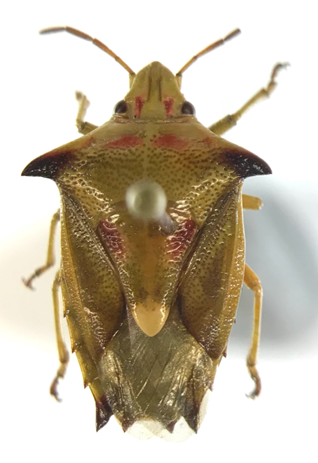

Scientific classification
- Kingdom: Animalia
- Phylum: Arthropoda
- Clade: Pancrustacea
- Class: Insecta
- Order: Hemiptera
- Suborder: Heteroptera
- Family: Pentatomidae
- Subfamily: Pentatominae
- Tribe: Rhynchocorini
- Genus: Morna; Stål, 1867
- Species: M. florens

Binomial name
- Morna florens (Walker, 1867)

Synonyms
- Cuspicona florens Walker, 1867; Morna cornuta Haglund, 1868

= Morna florens =

Genus and species of true bugs

Morna is a genus of stink bugs found in Australia. It consists of the sole species Morna florens, making it a monotypic taxon.

== Description ==
According to the original description (under the synonym Cuspicona florens):

This species is testaceous (dull brick-red) in colour, elongate-oval in shape and has a roughly punctured surface.

The head is smooth, elongate and transversely striated. It has two red stripes posteriorly and the clypeus (=middle lobe) barely extends beyond the mandibular plates (=lateral lobes). The rostrum extends to the point of the hind coxae and has a black tip. The antennae are less than half as long as the body, with the first segment not extending to the front of the head, the second segment much longer than the third, and the fourth as long as the third.

The prothorax has a red band and an anterior transverse smooth space on each side. The lateral angles form two thick, obtuse, slightly recurved spines. The scutellum is green with a reddish base and a yellowish tip. The lower surface of the thorax is red with some pale yellow spots on each side, and there is a deep keel that extends forward to the head.

The lower surface of the abdomen is red with pale yellow on each side and with short pale yellow bands. The apex of the abdomen has two thick spines, while the base has a spine that extends forward to the hind coxae.

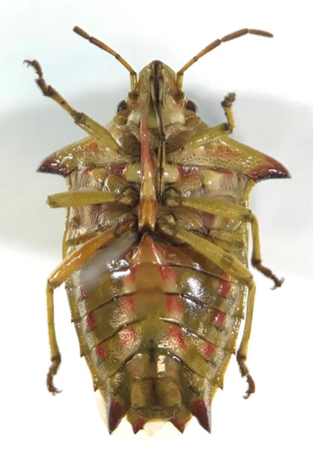
Underside, showing features such as the keel

The legs are stout. The forewings are green with clear membranes.

== Habitat and Behaviour ==
Morna florens has been observed in pine foliage.

When disturbed, this species reacts by dropping to the ground and playing dead.
