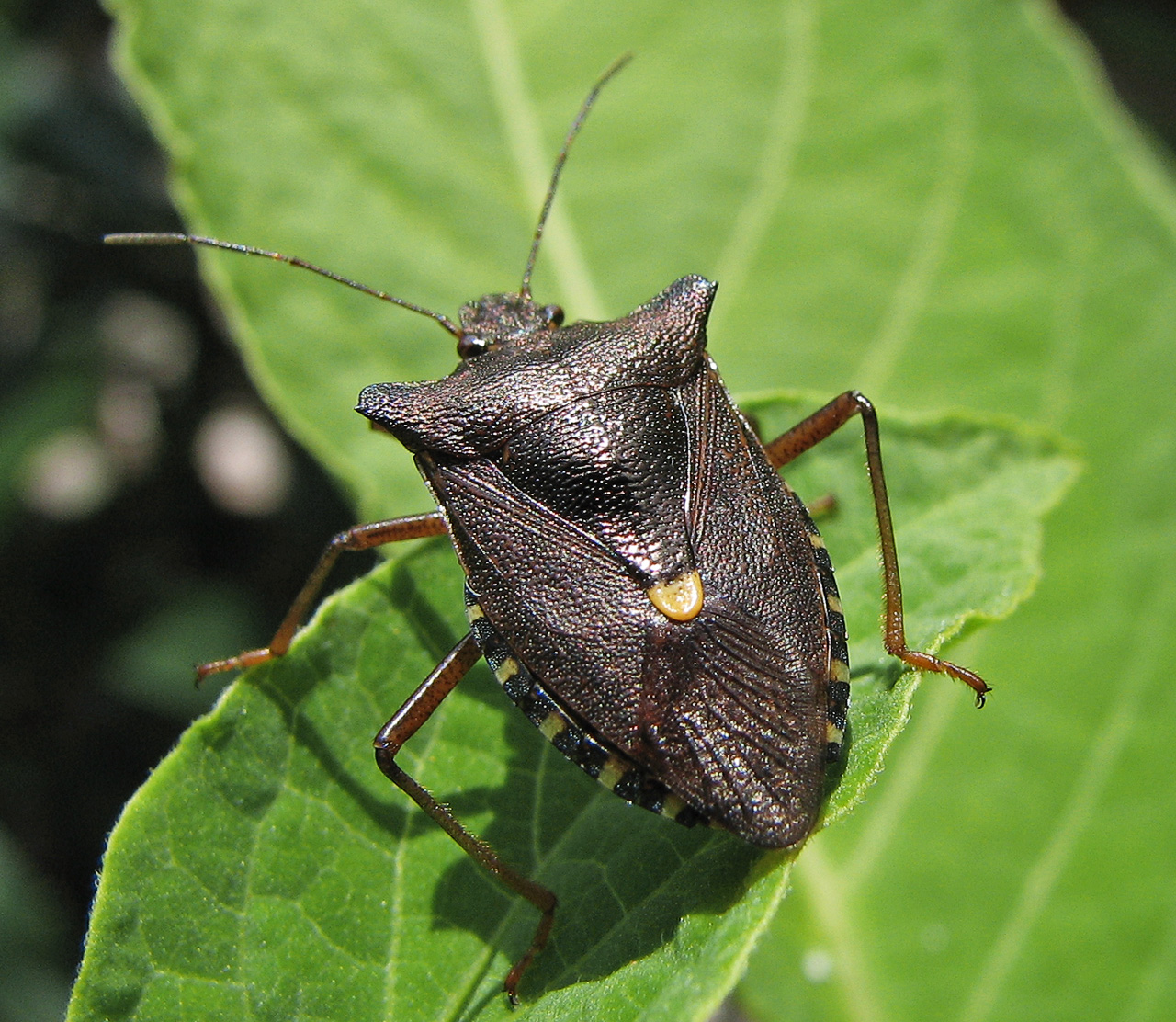
- Pentatoma rufipes

Scientific classification
- Kingdom: Animalia
- Phylum: Arthropoda
- Clade: Pancrustacea
- Class: Insecta
- Order: Hemiptera
- Suborder: Heteroptera
- Family: Pentatomidae
- Subfamily: Pentatominae; Leach, 1815

= Pentatominae =

Subfamily of true bugs

Pentatominae is a subfamily of Pentatomidae, a family of shield bugs. This subfamily is the largest one within the Pentatomidae, having 4937 species classified in 938 genera. Species in this subfamily are phytophages and several of them are considered agricultural pests. Some invasive pentatomines such as Halyomorpha halys and Bagrada hilaris have been considered household pests. Higher systematics of the group have been revised by Rider et al.

== Tribes and genera ==
Tribes within this subfamily include:

Aelini Douglas & Scott, 1865

1. Aelia Fabricius, 1803
2. Aeliopsis Bergevin, 1931
3. Neottiglossa Kirby, 1837

Aeptini Stål, 1871

1. Aeliosoma Baehr, 1985
2. Aeptus Dallas, 1851
3. Caridillus Bergroth, 1909
4. Eribotes Stål, 1867
5. Hillieria Distant, 1910
6. Mariomella Faúndez & Rider, 2019
7. Menestheus Stål, 1867
8. Paramenestheus Breddin, 1900
9. Pseudaelia Distant, 1910

=== Aeschrocorini ===
Authority: Distant, 1902

1. Aeschrocoris Bergroth, 1887
2. Aeschrus Spinola, 1850
3. Chraesus Cachan, 1952
4. Geomorpha Bergroth, 1893
5. Risbecella Schouteden, 1942
6. Scylax Distant, 1887
7. Tyoma Spinola, 1850
8. Tyomana Miller, 1952

Agaeini Cachan, 1952

1. Agaeus Dallas, 1851

Agonoscelidini Atkinson, 1888

1. Agonoscelis Spinola, 1837

=== Amyntorini ===
Authority: Distant, 1902

1. Ambohicorypha Cachan, 1952
2. Belopis Distant, 1879
3. Bolaca Walker, 1867
4. Halyabbas Distant, 1900
5. Madecorypha Cachan, 1952
6. Sennertus Distant, 1900

Antestiini Distant, 1902 - selected genera

- Antestia Stål, 1865
- Antestiopsis Leston, 1952
- Dryadocoris Kirkaldy, 1909
- Plautia Stål, 1864

Aulacetrini Mulsant & Rey, 1866

1. Holcogaster Fieber, 1860

=== Axiagastini ===
Authority: Atkinson, 1888

1. Acesines Stål, 1876
2. Axiagastus Dallas, 1851
3. Indrapura China, 1928
4. Oncotropis Stål, 1871

Bathycoeliini Atkinson, 1888

1. Bathycoelia Amyot & Serville, 1843

=== Cappaeini ===
Authority: Atkinson, 1888

1. Adelolcus Bergroth, 1893
2. Benia Schouteden, 1916
3. Boerias Kirkaldy, 1909
4. Cappaea Ellenrieder, 1862
5. Caura Stål, 1865
6. Cauromorpha Jeannel, 1913
7. Erlangerella Schouteden, 1905
8. Halycorypha Jeannel, 1913
9. Halydicoris Jeannel, 1913
10. Halyoides Cachan, 1952
11. Halyomorpha Mayr, 1864
12. Homalogonia Jakovlev, 1876
13. Hymenomaga Karsch, 1892
14. Lerida Karsch, 1894
15. Leridella Jeannel, 1913
16. Lokaia Linnavuori, 1975
17. Mabusana Distant, 1912
18. Massocephalus Dallas, 1851
19. Paralerida Linnavuori, 1982
20. Prytanicoris Gross, 1978
21. Tolumnia Stål, 1867
22. Tripanda Berg, 1899
23. Tropicorypha Mayr, 1864
24. Veterna Stål, 1865

Carpocorini Mulsant & Rey, 1866

selected genera:

- Antheminia Mulsant & Rey, 1866
- Carpocoris Kolenati, 1846
- Chlorochroa Stål, 1872
- Dolycoris Mulsant & Rey, 1866
- Graphorn Faúndez, Rider, & Carvajal, 2017
- Peribalus Mulsant & Rey, 1866
- Rubiconia Dohrn, 1860
- Thestral Faúndez & Rider, 2014

=== Catacanthini ===
Authority: Atkinson, 1888

1. Arocera Spinola, 1837
2. Boea Walker, 1867
3. Catacanthus Spinola, 1837
4. Chalcocoris Dallas, 1851
5. Rhyssocephala Rider, 1992
6. Runibia Stål, 1861
7. Vitruvius Distant, 1901
8. Vulsirea Spinola, 1837

=== Caystrini ===
Authority: Ahmad & Afzal, 1979

1. Caystrus Stål, 1861
2. Cephaloplatus White, 1842
3. Heissocoris Ahmad & Afzal, 1979
4. Hippotiscus Bergroth, 1906
5. Kyrtalus Van Duzee, 1929
6. Lyalocoris Zahid, 2006
7. Mcdonaldiana Zahid, 2006
8. Neodius (Stål, 1867)
9. Neoparodius Zahid, 2006
10. Neoriazocoris Zahid, 2006
11. Paramecocoris Stål, 1853
12. Parodius Distant, 1900
13. Praetextatus Distant, 1901
14. Riazocoris Ahmad & Afzal, 1979
15. Valescus Distant, 1901

=== Chlorocorini ===
Authority: Rider, Greve, Schwertner & Grazia, 2018

1. Arvelius Spinola, 1837
2. Chlorocoris Spinola, 1837
3. Chloropepla Stål, 1867
4. Eludocoris Thomas, 1992
5. Fecelia Stål, 1872
6. Mayrinia Horváth, 1925
7. Rhyncholepta Bergroth, 1911

Coquereliini Cachan, 1952

1. Cleoqueria Cachan, 1952
2. Coquerelia Signoret, 1861
3. Coquerelidea Reuter, 1887
4. Neocoquerelidea Cachan, 1952

Degonetini Azim & Shafee, 1984

1. Degonetus Distant, 1902

Diemeniini Kirkaldy, 1909 - selected genera

- Commius Stål, 1876
- Diemenia Spinola, 1850

Diplostirini Distant, 1902

1. Ambiorix Stål, 1876
2. Diplostira Dallas, 1851

Diploxyini Atkinson, 1888

1. Acoloba Spinola, 1850
2. Aeladria Cachan, 1952
3. Diploxys Amyot & Serville, 1843

Eurysaspidini Atkinson, 1888

1. Eurysaspis Signoret, 1851
2. Flaminia Stål, 1865

=== Eysarcorini ===
Authority: Mulsant & Rey, 1866

1. Adria Stål, 1876
2. Aspavia Stål, 1865
3. Cachanocoris Rider, 1998
4. Carbula Stål, 1864
5. Corisseura Cachan, 1952
6. Cratonotus Distant, 1879
7. Durmia Stål, 1865
8. Dymantiscus Hsiao, 1981
9. Empiesta Linnavuori, 1982
10. Eysarcoris Hahn, 1834
11. Hermolaus Distant, 1902
12. Mulungua Linnavuori, 1982
13. Pseudolerida Schouteden, 1958
14. Sepontia Stål, 1865
15. Sepontiella Miyamoto, 1990
16. Spermatodes Bergroth, 1914
17. Stagonomus Gorski, 1852

Halyini Amyot & Serville, 1843 - selected genera

- Apodiphus Spinola, 1837
- Brochymena Amyot & Serville, 1843
- Dalpada Amyot & Serville, 1843
- Halys Fabricius, 1803
- Omyta Spinola, 1850
- Theseus Stål, 1867

=== Hoplistoderini ===
Authority: Atkinson, 1888

1. Alcimocoris Bergroth, 1891
2. Glottaspis Bergroth, 1918
3. Hoplistodera Westwood, 1837
4. Paracritheus Bergroth, 1891
5. Paralcimocoris Zhang & Lin, 1988
6. Stachyomia Stål, 1871
7. Taurodes Dallas, 1851

=== Lestonocorini ===
Authority: Ahmad & Mohammad, 1980

1. Dardjilingia Yang, 1936
2. Gynenica Dallas, 1851
3. Lestonocoris Ahmad & Mohammad, 1980
4. Neogynenica Yang, 1935
5. Umgababa Leston, 1953

Mecideini Distant, 1902

1. Mecidea Dallas, 1851

Memmiini Cachan, 1952

1. Memmia Stål, 1865

=== Menidini ===
Authority: Atkinson, 1888

1. Actuarius Distant, 1901
2. Aegaleus Stål, 1876
3. Amphimachus Stål, 1867
4. Anchesmus Stål, 1876
5. Apines Dallas, 1851
6. Aspideurus Signoret, 1880
7. Banya Schouteden, 1916
8. Brachycoris Stål, 1871
9. Carvalhocoris Leston, 1953
10. Cresphontes Stål, 1867
11. Dabessus Distant, 1902
12. Decellella Schouteden, 1964
13. Desertomenida Kiritshenko, 1914
14. Dunnius Distant, 1902
15. Elanela Rolston, 1980
16. Eurymenida Bergroth, 1917
17. Gwea Schouteden, 1958
18. Keleacoris Rider & Rolston, 1995
19. Lathraedoeus Breddin, 1900
20. Menida Motschulsky, 1861
21. Neostrachia Saunders, 1877
22. Phavorinus Distant, 1902
23. Rio Kirkaldy, 1909
24. Saceseurus Breddin, 1900
25. Sciomenida Gross, 1976
26. Solenocoris Oshanin, 1922
27. Udonga Distant, 1921

Myrocheini Stål, 1871

- e.g. Myrochea Amyot & Serville, 1843

Nealeriini Cachan, 1952

1. Nealeria Bergroth, 1893
2. Paraleria Reuter, 1887

Nezarini Atkinson, 1888 - selected genera

- Nezara Amyot et Serville, 1843
- Palomena Mulsant et Rey, 1866

Opsitomini Cachan, 1952

1. Opsitoma Cachan, 1952

Pentamyrmexini Rider & Brailovsky, 2014

1. Pentamyrmex Rider & Brailovsky, 2014 (monogeneric, Thailand)

Pentatomini Leach, 1815 - selected genera

- Pentatoma Olivier, 1789

Phricodini Cachan, 1952

1. Phricodus Spinola, 1839

Piezodorini Atkinson, 1888

1. Anaximenes Stål, 1876
2. Chaubattiana Distant, 1912
3. Pausias Jakovlev, 1905
4. Piezodorus Fieber, 1860

=== Procleticini ===
Authority: Pennington, 1920

1. Aleixus McDonald, 1981
2. Brepholoxa Van Duzee, 1904
3. Dendrocoris Bergroth, 1891
4. Lobepomis Berg, 1891
5. Neoderoploa Pennington, 1922
6. Odmalea Bergroth, 1914
7. Parodmalea Rider, 1994
8. Procleticus Berg, 1891
9. Pseudobebaeus Distant, 1911
10. Terania Pirán, 1963
11. Thoreyella Spinola, 1850

=== Tribes R-S ===
Rhynchocorini Stål, 1871 - selected genera

- Morna Stål, 1867
- Rhynchocoris Westwood, 1837
- Vitellus Stål, 1865

Rolstoniellini Rider, 1997

1. Agathocles Stål, 1876
2. Amasenus Stål, 1863
3. Amatembuna Distant, 1910
4. Critheus Stål, 1867
5. Exithemus Distant, 1902
6. Rolstoniellus Rider, 1997

Sciocorini Amyot & Serville, 1843 selected genera

- Dyroderes Spinola, 1837
- Sciocoris Fallén, 1829

Strachiini Mulsant & Rey, 1866 selected genera

- Afrania Stål, 1865
- Bagrada Stål, 1862
- Eurydema Laporte de Castelnau, 1833
- Murgantia Stål, 1862
- Stenozygum Fieber, 1861
- Trochiscocoris Reuter, 1890

Triplatyxini Cachan, 1952

1. Anoano Cachan, 1952
2. Nenes Kment, 2015
3. Tricompastes Cachan, 1952
4. Triplatyx Horváth, 1904

=== Genera incertae sedis ===
1. Amphidexius Bergroth, 1918
2. Bachesua Gross, 1975
3. Birna McDonald, 2006
4. Brizocoris Gross, 1975
5. Buthumka Gross, 1975
6. Cooperocoris Gross, 1975
7. Dysnoetus Bergroth, 1918
8. Eremophilacoris Gross, 1975
9. Gadarscama Reuter, 1887
10. Ippatha Distant, 1910
11. Kitsonia Gross, 1975
12. Kitsoniocoris Rider, 1998
13. Kumbutha Distant, 1910
14. Lakhonia Yang, 1936
15. Macrocarenoides Gross, 1975
16. Macrocarenus Stål, 1873
17. Mcphersonarcys Thomas, 2012
18. Muscanda Walker, 1868
19. Ochisme Kirkaldy, 1904
20. Ooldeon Gross, 1975
21. Patanius Rolston, 1987
22. Pirricoris Gross, 1975
23. Poecilotoma Dallas, 1851
24. Riaziana Hasan, Afzal & Ahmad, 1989
25. Senectius Rolston, 1987
26. Tepperocoris Gross, 1975
27. Thryptomenecoris Gross, 1975
28. Trachyops Dallas, 1851
29. Turrubulana Distant, 1910
30. Xiengia Distant, 1921
31. Zouicoris Zheng, 1986

=== Notable species ===
- Acrostemum hilare – green stink bug
- Bagrada hilaris – bagrada bug
- Bathycoelia thalassina - African cocoa shield bug
- Halyomorpha halys – brown marmorated stink bug
- Nezara viridula - green vegetable bug
- Pentatoma rufipes – forest bug
- Piezodorus lituratus – gorse shield bug
