= Spermatodes =

Scientific classification
- Kingdom: Animalia
- Phylum: Arthropoda
- Class: Insecta
- Order: Hemiptera
- Suborder: Heteroptera
- Family: Pentatomidae
- Subfamily: Pentatominae
- Tribe: Eysarcorini
- Genus: Spermatodes; Bergroth, 1912

Synonyms
- Caenina Walker, 1867 (homonym)

Genus of true bugs

Spermatodes is a genus of shield bugs belonging to the family Pentatomidae, subfamily Pentatominae.

== Species ==
- Spermatodes australis (Schouteden, 1906)
- Spermatodes grossi McDonald, 1989
- Spermatodes parvus (Distant, 1910)
- Spermatodes variolosus (Walker, 1867)
