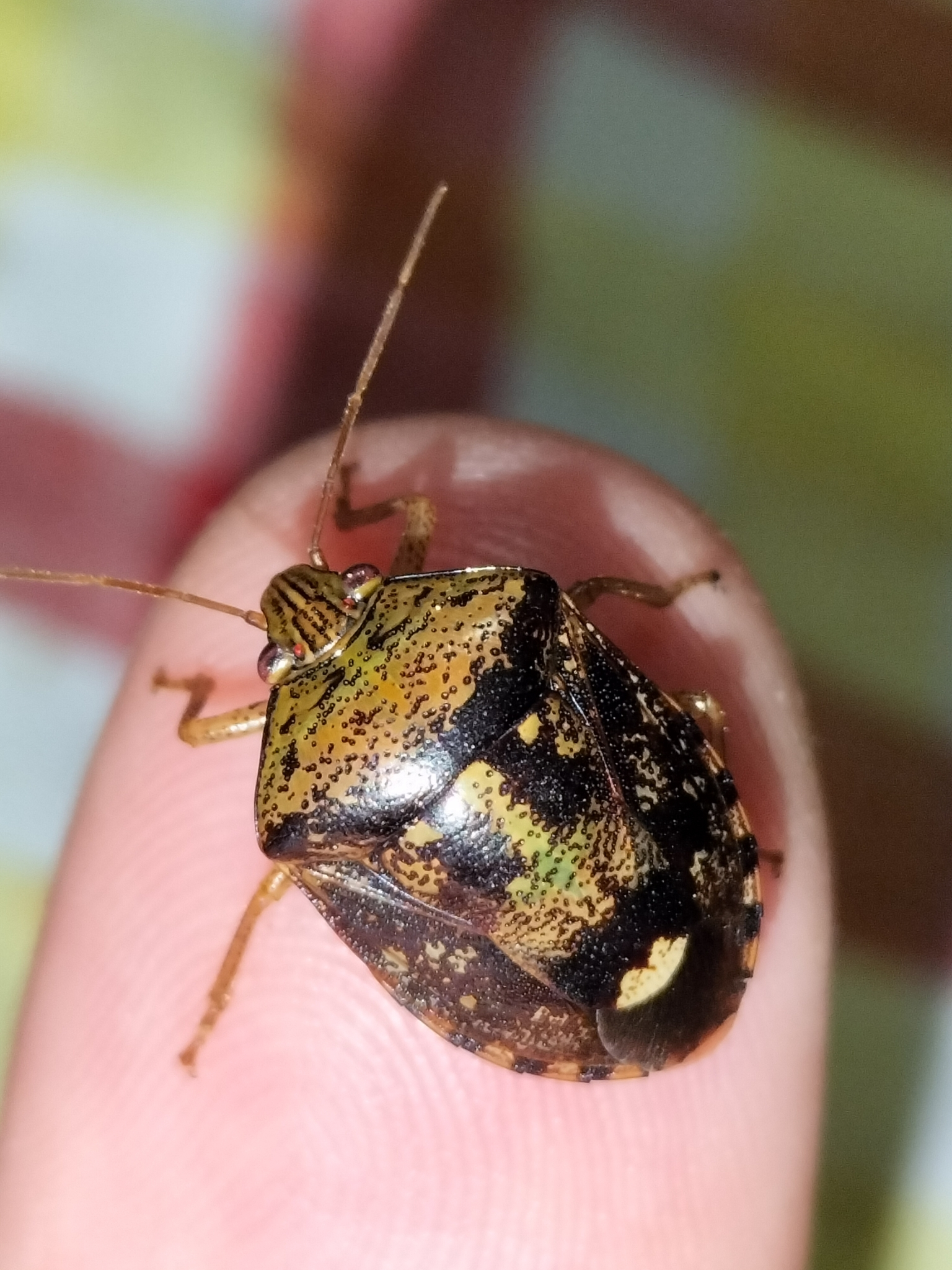
- Axiagastus rosmarus

Scientific classification
- Domain: Eukaryota
- Kingdom: Animalia
- Phylum: Arthropoda
- Class: Insecta
- Order: Hemiptera
- Suborder: Heteroptera
- Family: Pentatomidae
- Tribe: Axiagastini
- Genus: Axiagastus; Dallas, 1851

= Axiagastus =

Genus of true bugs

Axiagastus is a genus of Asian and Australian shield-bugs in the subfamily Pentatominae; it is the type genus of the tribe Axiagastini and was erected by William Sweetland Dallas in 1851.

== Species ==
The following are recorded in BioLib.cz and elsewhere:

1. Axiagastus dubius Jensen-Haarup, 1938
2. Axiagastus marmoratus (Montrouzier, 1855)
3. Axiagastus mitescens Distant, 1901
4. Axiagastus rosmarus Dallas, 1851 - type species
