= Lerida (bug) =

Scientific classification
- Domain: Eukaryota
- Kingdom: Animalia
- Phylum: Arthropoda
- Class: Insecta
- Order: Hemiptera
- Suborder: Heteroptera
- Family: Pentatomidae
- Subfamily: Pentatominae
- Tribe: Cappaeini
- Genus: Lerida; Karsch, 1894

Synonyms
- Ilerda Stål, 1865; Menuthias Kirkaldy, 1904

Genus of grasshoppers

External image
- Image at iNaturalist

Lerida is a genus of African shield-bugs in the subfamily Pentatominae and tribe Cappaeini, erected by Ferdinand Karsch in 1894.

== Species ==
Biolib and The Global Biodiversity Information Facility include the following names:

1. Lerida annulicornis (Signoret, 1861)
2. Lerida bolivari Schouteden, 1904
3. Lerida fusca Bergroth, 1907
4. Lerida incerta Schouteden, 1909
5. Lerida punctata (Palisot de Beauvois, 1807)
6. Lerida rubicunda (Stål, 1865)
