= Tolumnia (bug) =

Scientific classification
- Domain: Eukaryota
- Kingdom: Animalia
- Phylum: Arthropoda
- Class: Insecta
- Order: Hemiptera
- Suborder: Heteroptera
- Family: Pentatomidae
- Subfamily: Pentatominae
- Tribe: Cappaeini
- Genus: Tolumnia; Stål, 1867

Genus of true bugs

External image
- Images at iNaturalist

Tolumnia is a genus of Asian shield-bugs in the tribe Cappaeini, erected by Carl Stål in 1867.

== Species ==
These species belong to the genus Tolumnia:

- Tolumnia antennata Distant, 1902
- Tolumnia basalis (Dallas, 1851)
- Tolumnia elongata Hasan & Ahmad, 1988
- Tolumnia gutta (Dallas, 1851)
- Tolumnia horni Breddin, 1909
- Tolumnia immaculata Distant, 1900
- Tolumnia latipes (Dallas, 1851)
- Tolumnia longirostris (Dallas, 1851)
- Tolumnia malayensis Hasan & Ahmad, 1988
- Tolumnia maxima Distant, 1902
- Tolumnia papulifera Bergroth, 1922
- Tolumnia southwoodi Hasan & Ahmad, 1988
- Tolumnia trinotata (Westwood, 1837)
