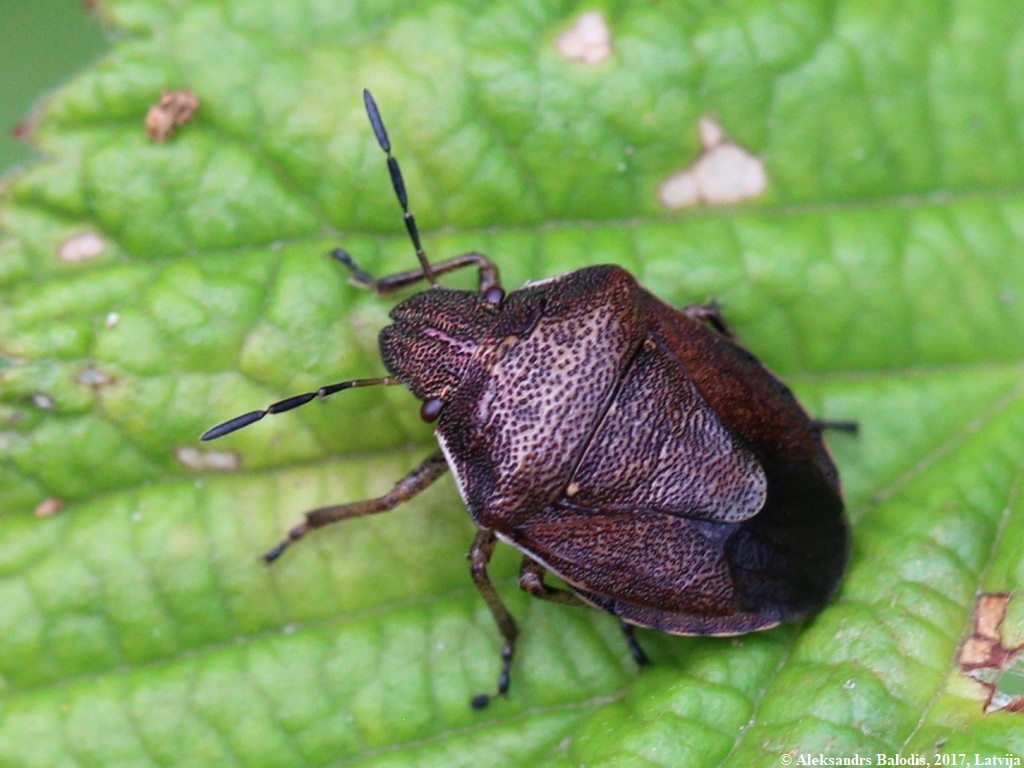
- Image of Rubiconia intermedia

Scientific classification
- Kingdom: Animalia
- Phylum: Arthropoda
- Class: Insecta
- Order: Hemiptera
- Suborder: Heteroptera
- Family: Pentatomidae
- Genus: Rubiconia; Dohrn, 1860

= Rubiconia =

Genus of true bugs

Rubiconia is a genus of true bugs belonging to the family Pentatomidae.

The species of this genus are found in Europe and Japan.

Species:

- Rubiconia intermedia (Wolff, 1811)
