= Pellaea =

Pellaea may refer to one of two different genera:

- Pellaea (bug), a genus of stink bugs.
- Pellaea (plant), a genus of ferns.
