= Banasa subcarnea =

Scientific classification
- Domain: Eukaryota
- Kingdom: Animalia
- Phylum: Arthropoda
- Class: Insecta
- Order: Hemiptera
- Suborder: Heteroptera
- Family: Pentatomidae
- Tribe: Pentatomini
- Genus: Banasa
- Species: B. subcarnea

Binomial name
- Banasa subcarnea Van Duzee, 1935

Species of true bug

Banasa subcarnea is a species of stink bug in the family Pentatomidae. It is found in North America.
