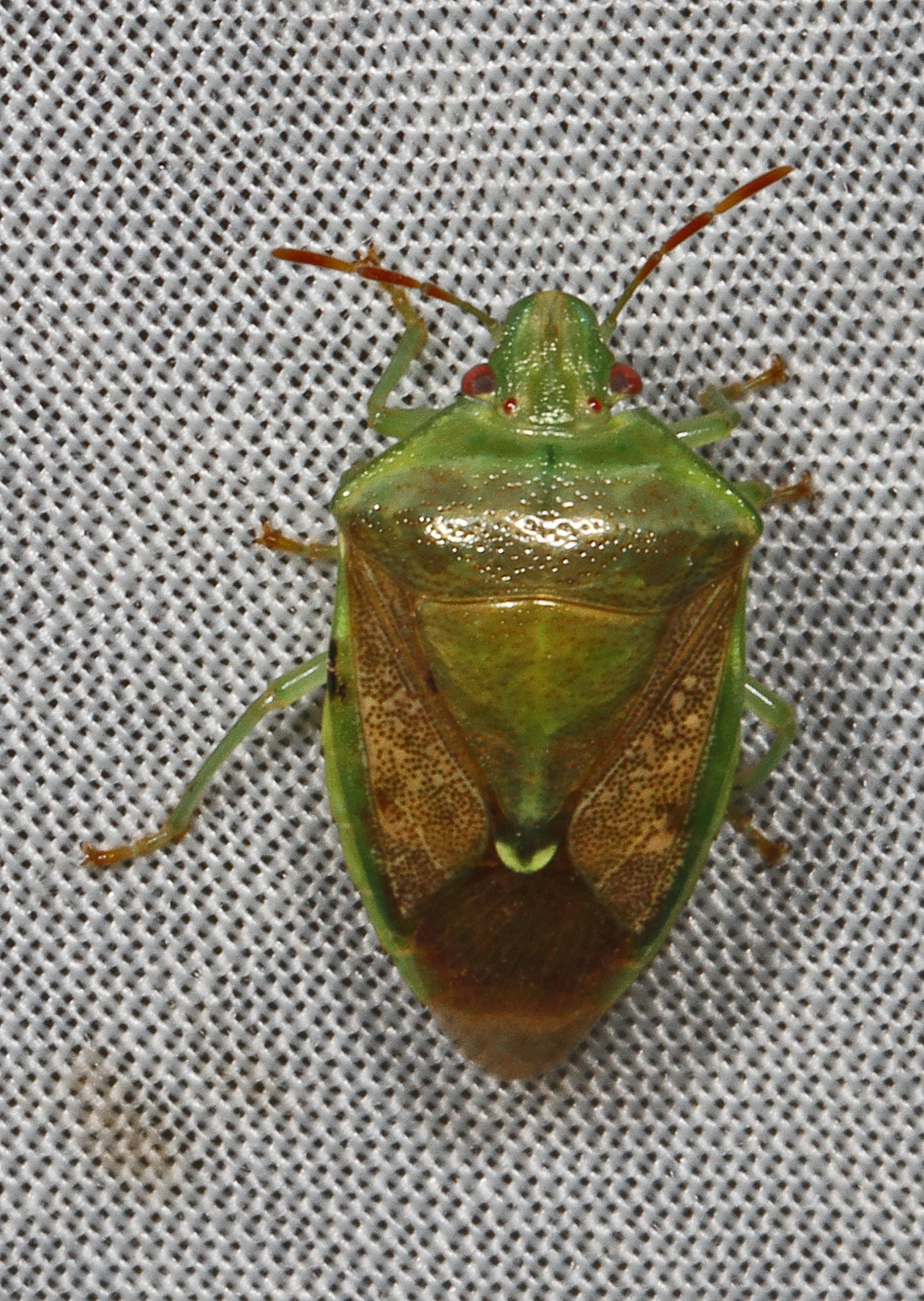

Scientific classification
- Kingdom: Animalia
- Phylum: Arthropoda
- Clade: Pancrustacea
- Class: Insecta
- Order: Hemiptera
- Suborder: Heteroptera
- Family: Pentatomidae
- Tribe: Pentatomini
- Genus: Banasa
- Species: B. calva

Binomial name
- Banasa calva (Say, 1832)

= Banasa calva =

Species of true bug

Banasa calva is a species of stink bug in the family Pentatomidae. It is native to Central America and North America, commonly encountered in the eastern United States and throughout Latin America. It is a phytophagous species that feeds on trees and shrubs.

== Description ==
Banasa calva are approximately 8.5-12 mm long and are primarily green and/or brown with a reddish tint on the lower half of its back. These stink bugs are known for laying their eggs in clusters on the underside of dogwood leaves for their nymphs to feed on.

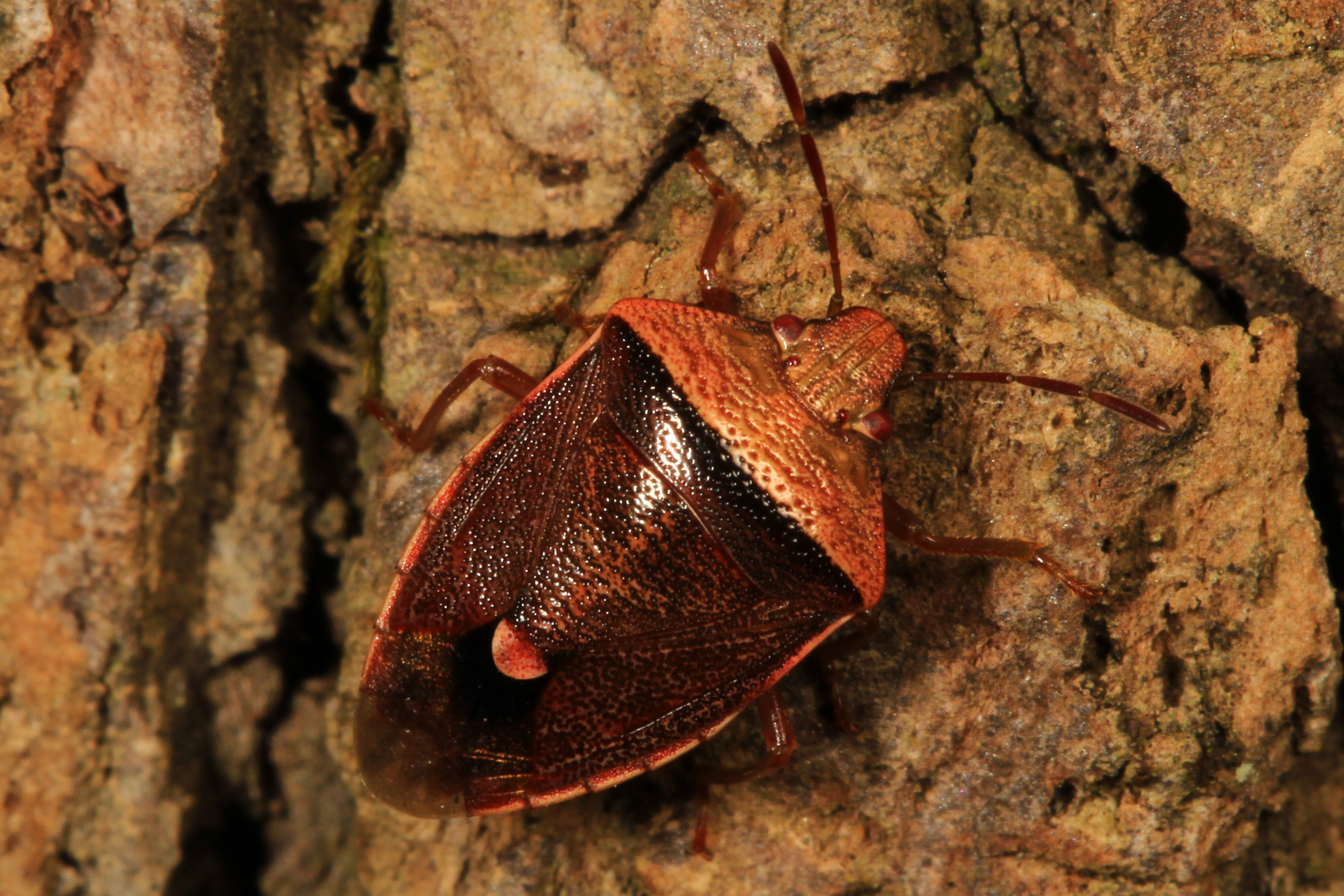
