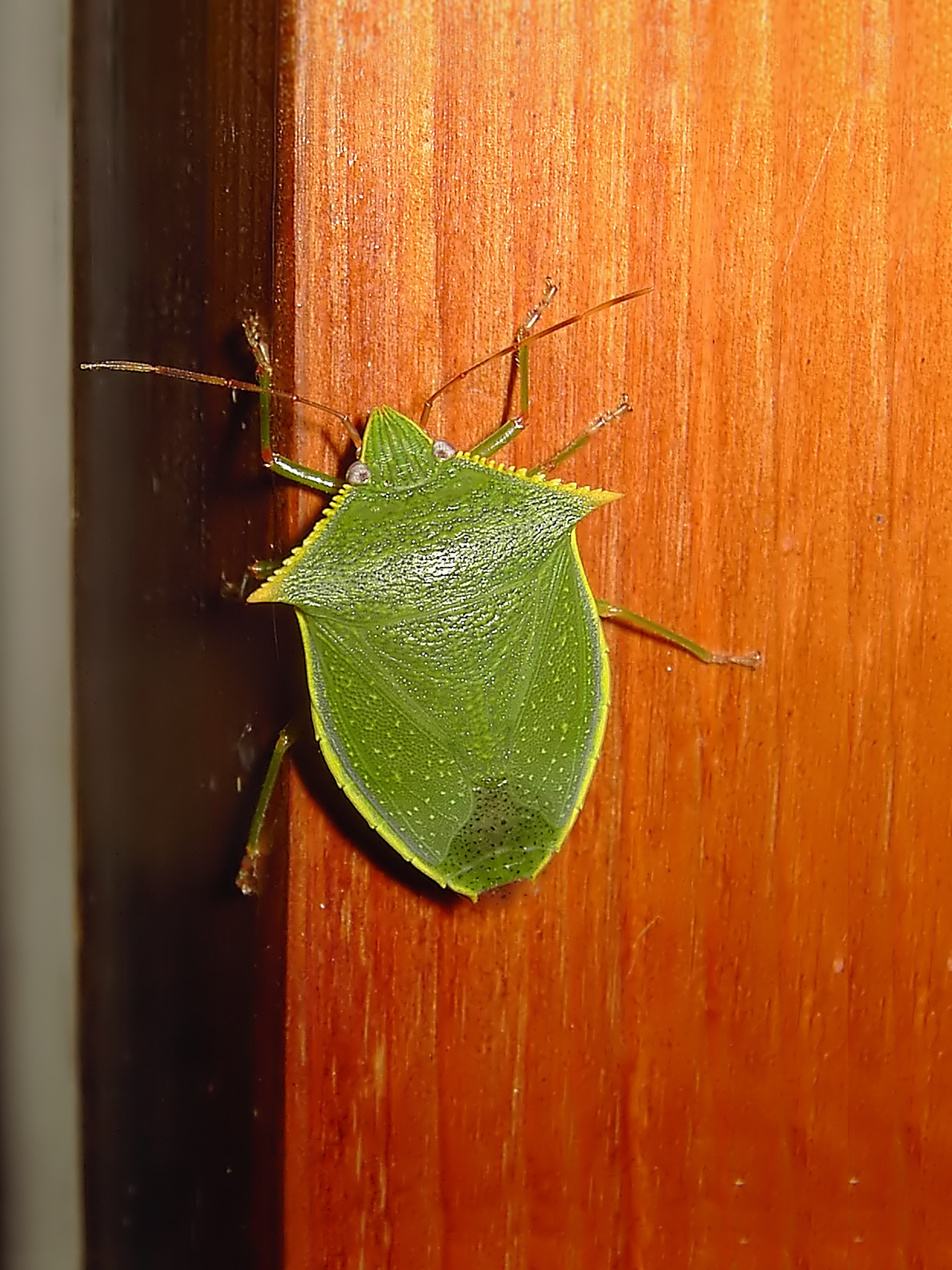
- Loxa viridis

Scientific classification
- Kingdom: Animalia
- Phylum: Arthropoda
- Clade: Pancrustacea
- Class: Insecta
- Order: Hemiptera
- Suborder: Heteroptera
- Family: Pentatomidae
- Tribe: Pentatomini
- Genus: Loxa; Amyot & Serville, 1843

Species
- see text

= Loxa =

Genus of true bugs

Loxa is an insect genus in the family of shield bugs. It occurs primarily in Central America and Mexico, but is also found in Texas, Florida and South America. While Loxa is a genus of the tribe Pentatomini, its species are similar in many respects to those in the Chlorocorini, specifically the genera: Chlorocoris Spinola, Chloropepla Stål, Mayrinia Horvath and Fecelia Stål. Some species of Loxa are minor crop pests, for example Loxa deducta.

Species include:

- Loxa deducta Walker, 1867
- Loxa flavicollis (Drury, 1773)
- Loxa haematica (Herrich-Schäffer, 1841)
- Loxa peruviensis Eger, 1978
- Loxa planiceps Horváth, 1925
- Loxa virescens Amyot & Serville, 1843
- Loxa viridis (Palisot de Beauvois, 1811)
