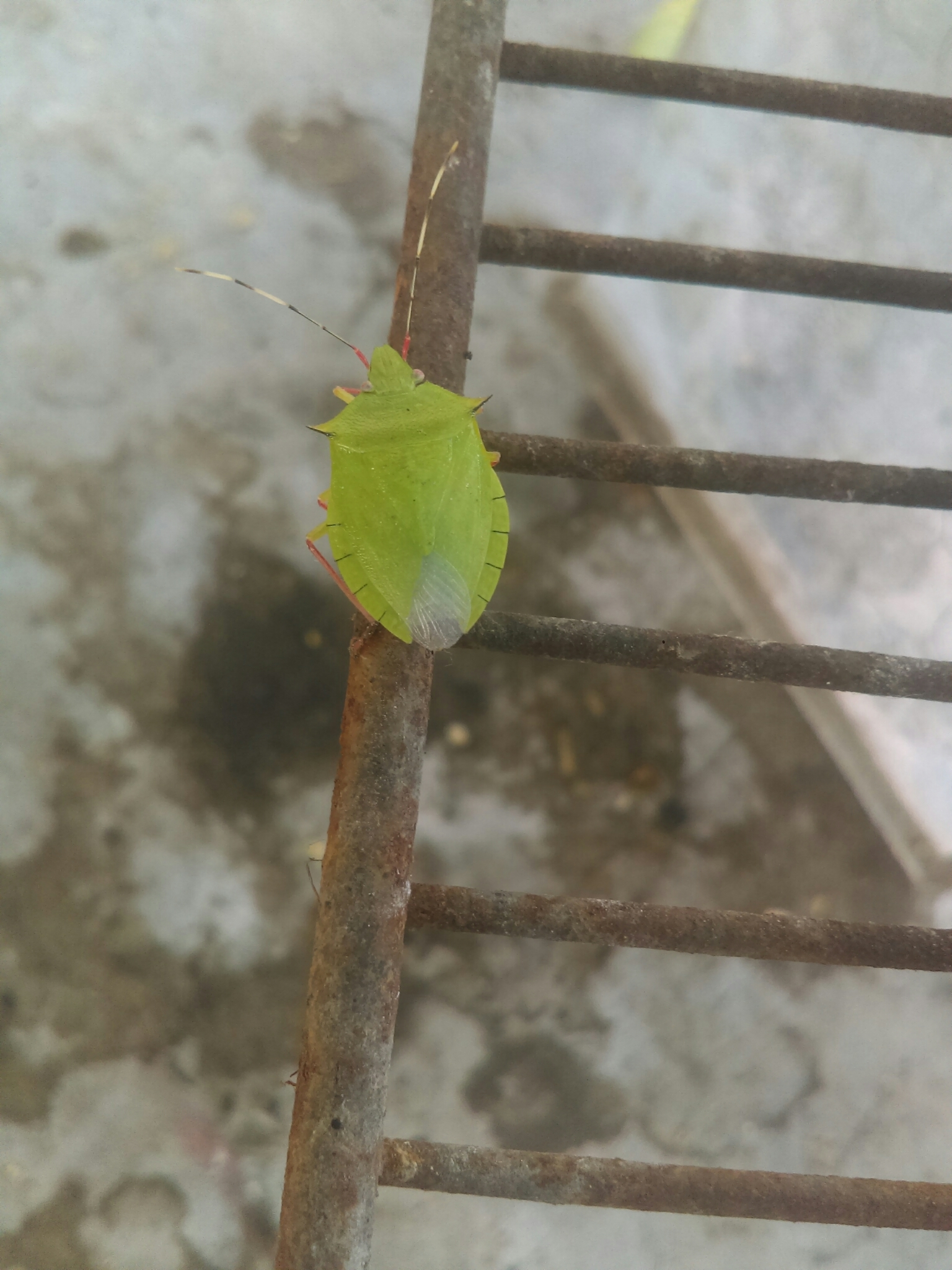

Scientific classification
- Domain: Eukaryota
- Kingdom: Animalia
- Phylum: Arthropoda
- Class: Insecta
- Order: Hemiptera
- Suborder: Heteroptera
- Family: Pentatomidae
- Tribe: Pentatomini
- Genus: Chlorocoris
- Species: C. distinctus

Binomial name
- Chlorocoris distinctus Signoret, 1851

= Chlorocoris distinctus =

Species of true bug

Chlorocoris distinctus is a species of stink bug in the family Pentatomidae. It is found in Central America, North America, and South America.
