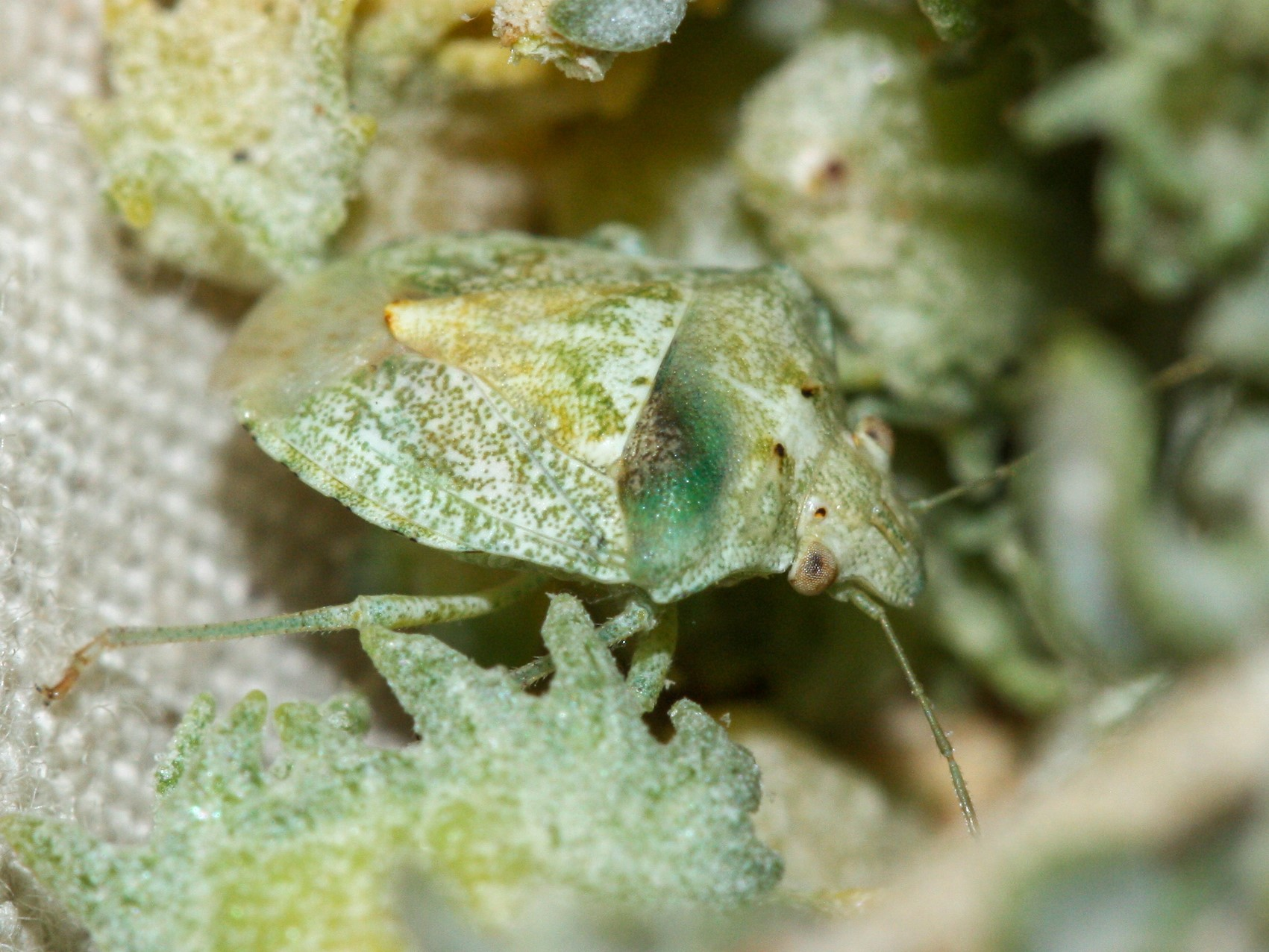

Scientific classification
- Domain: Eukaryota
- Kingdom: Animalia
- Phylum: Arthropoda
- Class: Insecta
- Order: Hemiptera
- Suborder: Heteroptera
- Family: Pentatomidae
- Tribe: Pentatomini
- Genus: Tepa
- Species: T. jugosa

Binomial name
- Tepa jugosa (Van Duzee, 1923)

= Tepa jugosa =

Species of true bug

Tepa jugosa is a species of stink bug in the family Pentatomidae. It is found in Central and North America.
