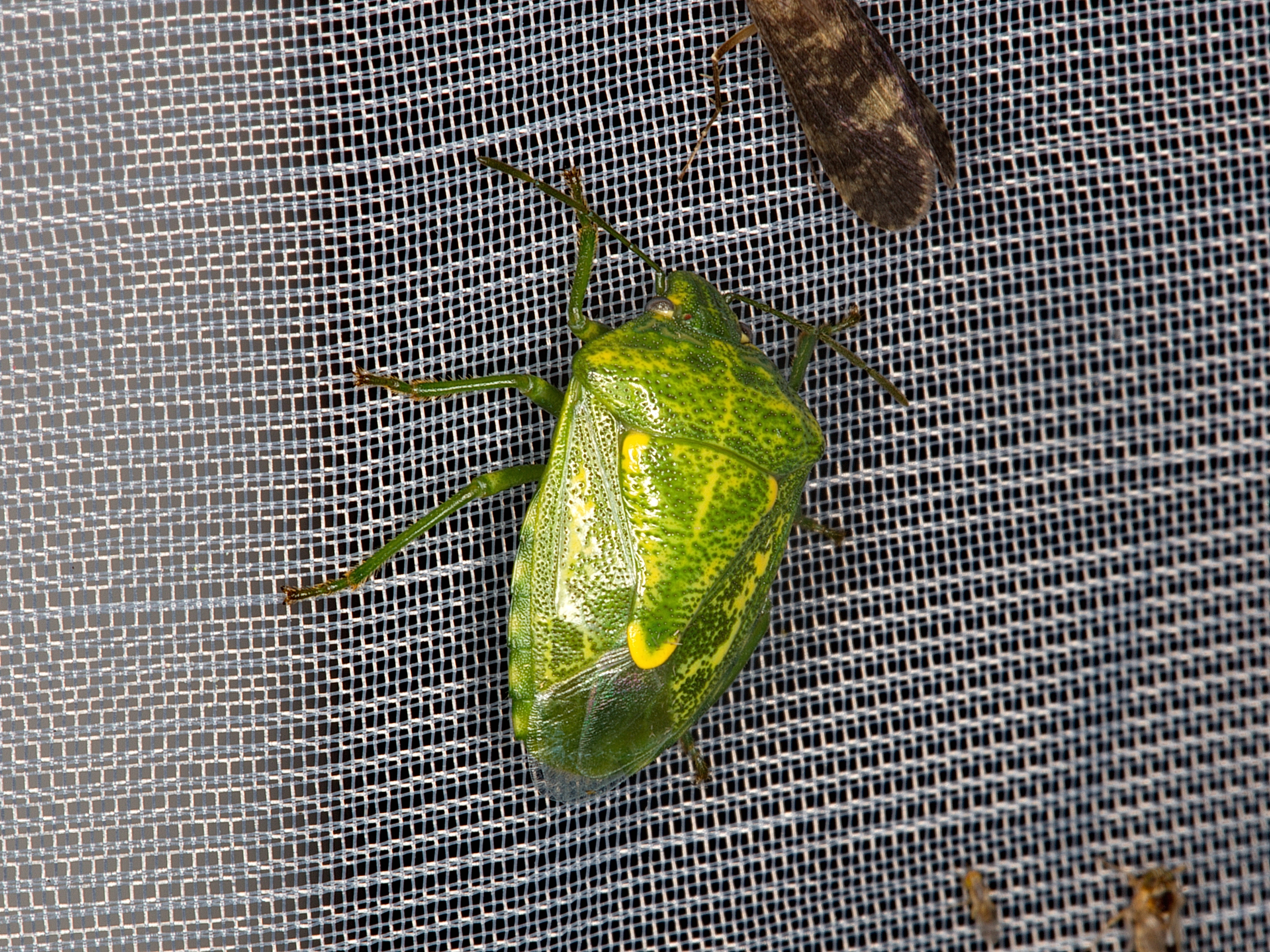

Scientific classification
- Kingdom: Animalia
- Phylum: Arthropoda
- Clade: Pancrustacea
- Class: Insecta
- Order: Hemiptera
- Suborder: Heteroptera
- Family: Pentatomidae
- Tribe: Pentatomini
- Genus: Banasa
- Species: B. euchlora

Binomial name
- Banasa euchlora Stål, 1872

= Banasa euchlora =

Species of true bug

Banasa euchlora, known generally as the juniper stink bug or jade stinkbug, is a species of stink bug in the family Pentatomidae. It is found in North America.
