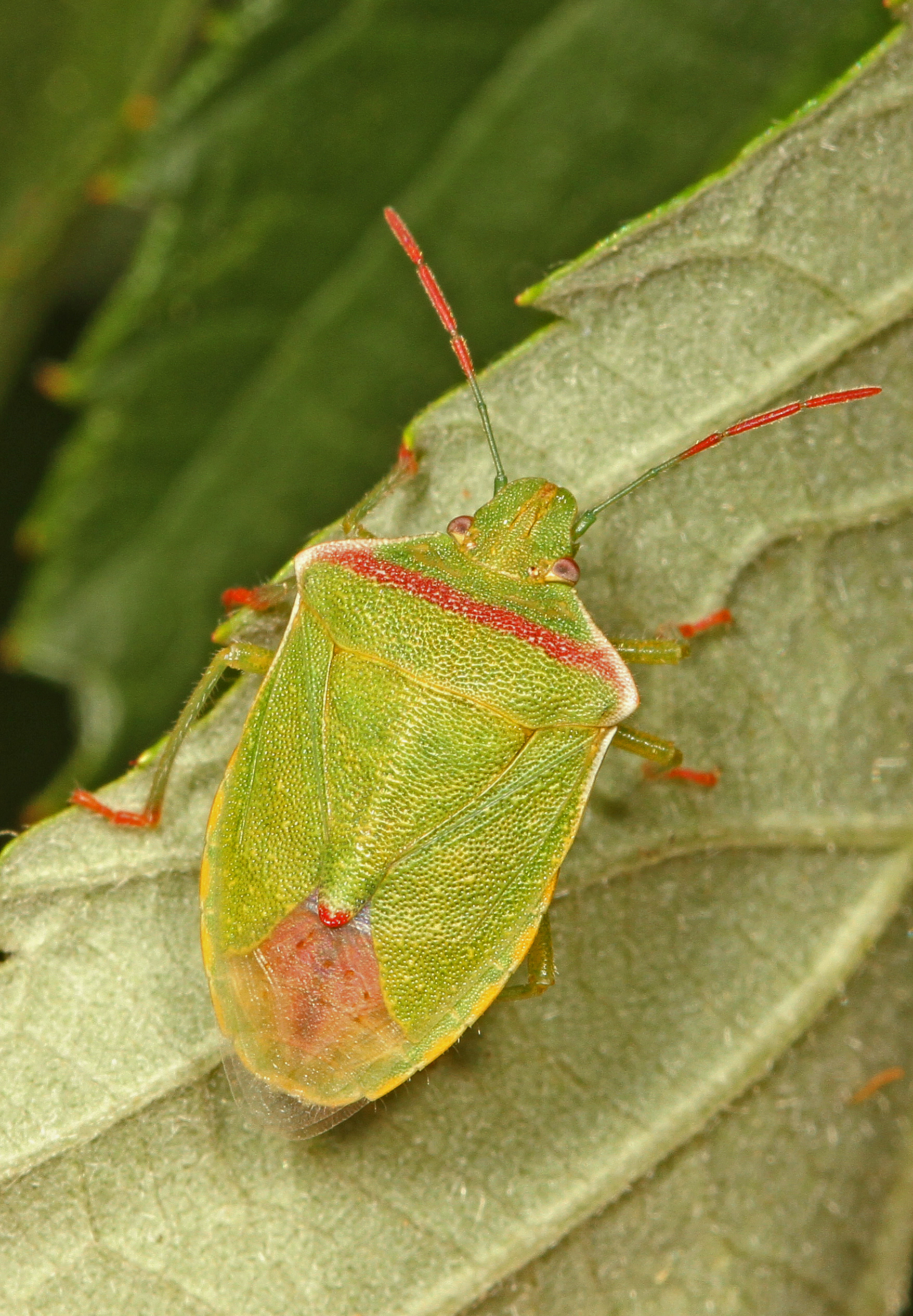

Scientific classification
- Kingdom: Animalia
- Phylum: Arthropoda
- Clade: Pancrustacea
- Class: Insecta
- Order: Hemiptera
- Suborder: Heteroptera
- Family: Pentatomidae
- Tribe: Pentatomini
- Genus: Thyanta
- Species: T. pallidovirens

Binomial name
- Thyanta pallidovirens (Stål, 1859)

= Thyanta pallidovirens =

Species of true bug

Thyanta pallidovirens, the red-shouldered stink bug, is a species of stink bug in the family Pentatomidae. It is found in Central America and North America.

== Subspecies ==
These three subspecies belong to the species Thyanta pallidovirens:

- Thyanta pallidovirens pallidovirens (Stål, 1859)
- Thyanta pallidovirens setosa Ruckes, 1957
- Thyanta pallidovirens spinosa Ruckes, 1957

== Reproduction ==
Male T. pallidovirens use a pheromone consisting of methyl (E,Z,Z)-2,4,6-decatrienoat and sesquiterpenes to attract females. Both males and females also use vibrational signals (songs) to attract mates. Males and females can each produce two different songs.
