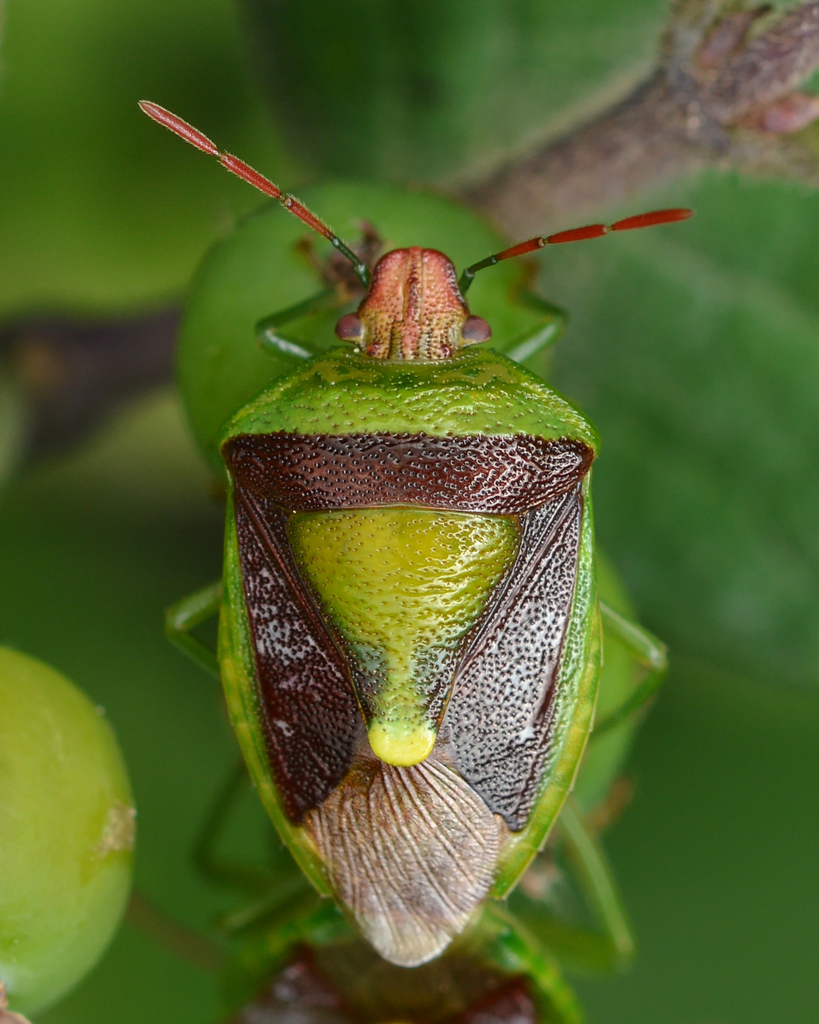

Scientific classification
- Kingdom: Animalia
- Phylum: Arthropoda
- Clade: Pancrustacea
- Class: Insecta
- Order: Hemiptera
- Suborder: Heteroptera
- Family: Pentatomidae
- Subfamily: Pentatominae
- Tribe: Pentatomini
- Genus: Banasa
- Species: B. dimidiata

Binomial name
- Banasa dimidiata (Stål, 1872)

Synonyms
- Pentatoma dimiata (Say, 1831) Banasa dimiata (Say, 1832)

= Banasa dimidiata =

Species of true bug

Banasa dimidiata, the green burgundy stink bug, is a species of stink bug. It is found in Canada and the United States.

== Description ==
Banasa dimidiata has a distinctive shield-shaped body, characteristic of the stink bug family (Pentatomidae). Its adult size ranges 8.5 mm to 11.0 mm. Its primary color is a vibrant green which helps it blend in with foliage, while the lower portions of its wings and the rear of its body exhibit a burgundy-brown hue. The transition between the green and burgundy sections is often smooth but can appear slightly iridescent. Its legs are a matching green. The antennae are long end in a reddish-brown color. Its eyes are small, round and dark, positioned on the sides of its head. The texture of its exoskeleton is smooth with a slight sheen, making it appear somewhat glossy in well-lit conditions.

== Range ==
The range extends trans-continentally from British Columbia to Nova Scotia in Canada, down through the United States from California to Texas to Florida, and into Mexico.

== Ecology ==
It is mostly observed from April to October, with the largest amount observed during June and July.

This particular species is a plant feeder and is found on a wide variety of trees and shrubs, often on berries, especially blueberries.

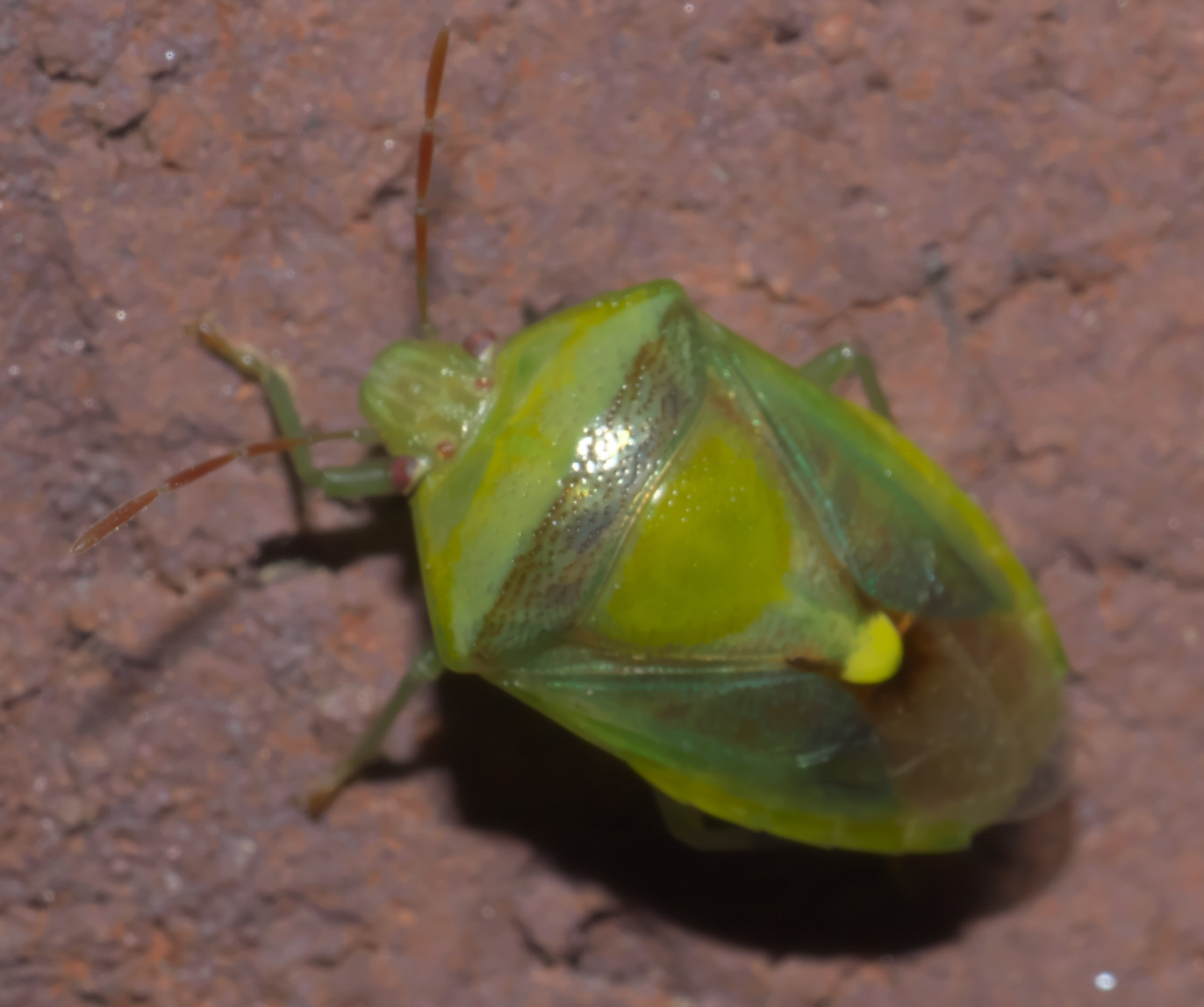
Banasa dimidiata, Oklahoma
