= Tepa yerma =

Scientific classification
- Domain: Eukaryota
- Kingdom: Animalia
- Phylum: Arthropoda
- Class: Insecta
- Order: Hemiptera
- Suborder: Heteroptera
- Family: Pentatomidae
- Tribe: Pentatomini
- Genus: Tepa
- Species: T. yerma

Binomial name
- Tepa yerma (Rolston, 1972)

Species of true bug

Tepa yerma is a species of stink bug in the family Pentatomidae. It is found in North America.
