= Cyptocephala alvarengai =

Scientific classification
- Kingdom: Animalia
- Phylum: Arthropoda
- Class: Insecta
- Order: Hemiptera
- Suborder: Heteroptera
- Family: Pentatomidae
- Subfamily: Pentatominae
- Tribe: Pentatomini
- Genus: Cyptocephala
- Species: C. alvarengai

Binomial name
- Cyptocephala alvarengai Rolston, 1986

Species of stink bug

Cyptocephala alvarengai is a species of stink bug from South America.

== Description ==
Cyptocephala alvarengai is a stink bug species discovered in Brazil. Adults are small (5.2–8.3 mm) and range in color from light brown to green.

C. alvarengai is found in dry habitats in northern and central South America, with no overlap with related species. It was described by Rolston (1986) based on multiple specimens, with the holotype stored at the Museu Nacional (UFRJ) in Brazil.

== Distribution ==
Brazil; Ceará, Bahia, Minas Gerais, and Pernambuco.

== Research ==
In 2012, adults were observed feeding on rice panicles at an experimental farm in Goiás. Specimens were identified at the Universidade Federal do Rio Grande do Sul, where voucher samples are stored. A research colony was later established from individuals collected in 2013 to study the species' biology and potential pest management strategies.

In 2013, Cyptocephala alvarengai egg masses were collected from rice panicles and observed in a laboratory in São José dos Pinhais to study their development. After hatching, nymphs remained near their eggshells until they reached the second stage, when they started feeding. Groups of nymphs were placed on rice panicles in cages and monitored daily until they became adults. Survival rates, development time, and sex ratios were recorded. Eggs were barrel-shaped and laid in double rows on leaves, spikelets, and cage walls. The development from egg to adult took about 33 days, with the highest mortality occurring in the egg and early nymph stages. About 45% of nymphs reached adulthood, with a male-to-female ratio of 1.2:1. Adults lived 16 to 46 days and began mating 48–72 hours after emergence. Females laid eggs on panicles and cage walls, with fertility declining as they aged. This study provides insight into the C. alvarengai life cycle, which could aid future pest management efforts.

There is no known information on the host plants, biology, natural enemies, or economic impact of Cyptocephala alvarengai. However, its feeding behavior and developmental traits resemble other stink bugs that damage rice panicles. If populations increase, C. alvarengai could become a significant pest for rice crops in Brazil, potentially causing economic losses. Its similarities to other rice-feeding stink bugs suggest it may pose a future threat to rice production.

In 2017, Barrigossi et al. recorded C. alvarengai complete life cycle in rice (Oryza sativa, Poaceae).
