= Thyanta pseudocasta =

Scientific classification
- Domain: Eukaryota
- Kingdom: Animalia
- Phylum: Arthropoda
- Class: Insecta
- Order: Hemiptera
- Suborder: Heteroptera
- Family: Pentatomidae
- Tribe: Pentatomini
- Genus: Thyanta
- Species: T. pseudocasta

Binomial name
- Thyanta pseudocasta Blatchley, 1926

Species of true bug

Thyanta pseudocasta is a species of stink bug in the family Pentatomidae. It is found in North America.
