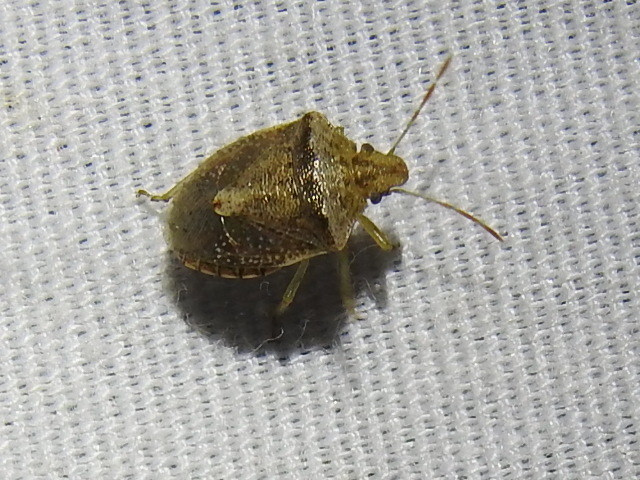
- Cyptocephala antiguensis

Scientific classification
- Kingdom: Animalia
- Phylum: Arthropoda
- Class: Insecta
- Order: Hemiptera
- Suborder: Heteroptera
- Family: Pentatomidae
- Tribe: Pentatomini
- Genus: Cyptocephala; Berg, 1883

= Cyptocephala =

Genus of true bugs

Cyptocephala is a genus of shield bugs described by Berg in 1883. They range from North to South America.

== Range ==
The United States of America, Mexico, and South America.

== Species ==
There are six known species of Cyptocephala.

Cyptocephala alvarengai (Rolston, 1986)

Cyptocephala antiguensis (Westwood, 1837)

Cyptocephala bimini (Ruckes, 1952)

Cyptocephala cogitabunda (Berg, 1883)

Cyptocephala elegans (Malloch, 1919)

Cyptocephala pallida (Rolston, 1986)

== Taxonomy ==
Carlos Berg proposed the genus Cyptocephala for a small, uncommon and previously unknown pentatomid, Cyptocephala cogitabunda, in 1883.

The genus remained monotypic until 1984, when Rolston and McDonald transferred four nominal species from the genus Thyanta (Stål) to Cyptocephala. These species were described originally as Pentatoma antiguensis (Westwood, 1837), Thyanta bimini (Ruckes, 1952), Thyanta elegans (Malloch, 1919), and Thyanta (Parathyanta) elegantula (Jensen-Haarup, 1928). Two new species are now added to the genus and C. elegantula is placed in the synonymy of C. cogitabunda.
