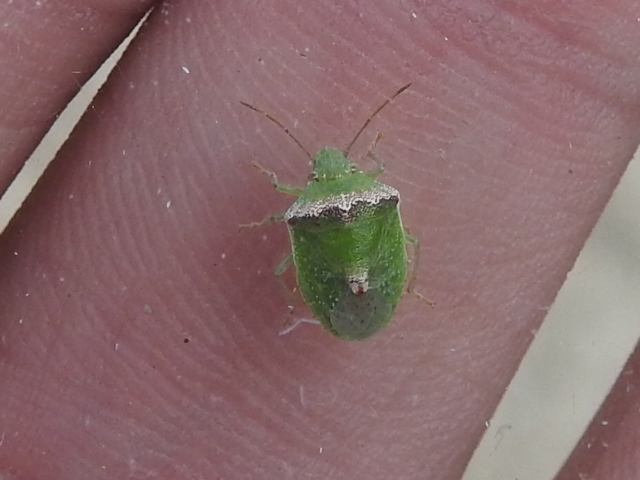

Scientific classification
- Domain: Eukaryota
- Kingdom: Animalia
- Phylum: Arthropoda
- Class: Insecta
- Order: Hemiptera
- Suborder: Heteroptera
- Family: Pentatomidae
- Genus: Cyptocephala
- Species: C. antiguensis

Binomial name
- Cyptocephala antiguensis (Rolston and McDonald, 1984) originally (Westwood, 1837)

= Cyptocephala antiguensis =

Species of true bug

Cyptocephala antiguensis, the Antigua Stink Bug, is a species of stink bug. It is found in the United States, West Indies, Central America, and northern South America.

== Description ==
This species varies in color, from a solid light tan to a rich green, often with ivory, reddish-brown, and black markings. These markings are especially noticeable as a multi-colored band across the back and a spot at the tip of the triangular scutellum.

The sides of the head are either parallel or nearly parallel between the area in front of the eyes and the smoothly rounded tip. The head projections (juga) do not extend beyond the central part (tylus). The edges of the pronotum (area behind the head) are straight to slightly curved inward and not raised. The triangular scutellum is about 38-46% of its base width at a specific point. The sides of the body (pleura) are smooth without raised areas. The body length, not including the wings, is between 5.5 and 7.8 mm.

The base plates are slightly swollen, and their inner edges are not visible from the side. The parameres (male reproductive structures) cover a small tooth-like structure on each side of the genital area. The front lobe of each paramere varies in width, sometimes being the same width as or much wider than the side lobe.

The slightly swollen base plates in females are unique within this genus. In males, only this species and Cyptocephala elegans have parameres (male reproductive structures) that completely cover the small tooth-like structure or ridge on the sides of the genital area. Unlike C. elegans, C. antiguensis does not have the raised pleural bands.

== Range ==
This species is found in southern California, Arizona, Texas, and Florida. It also ranges through Mexico, Central America, and the Caribbean, extending across northern South America and reaching as far south as northern Peru in the Andes region.

In the western part of its range, including as far south as western Panama, the paramere lobes are noticeably uneven in width. However, in the eastern part of its range, from Puerto Rico down through the Lesser Antilles and South America, the lobes are more evenly sized. Despite this, the typical western form is also found in Florida, Cuba, and Jamaica, while intermediate forms—showing traits from both the western and eastern variants—are present in Florida, Cuba, and Hispaniola. It's unclear whether a similar blending of traits occurs in eastern Panama or nearby Colombia, but most of the few males studied from western Panama show a narrowing of the front lobe.

== Taxonomy ==
This species has many synonyms:

- Pentatoma antiguensis (Westwood, 1837)
- Thyanta antiguensis (Westwood, 1837)
- Pentatoma taeniola (Dallas, 1851)
- Thyanta taeniola (Stål, 1862)
- Crato urbicus (Distant, 1893) (syn. by Rolston, 1976)
- Pentatoma taeniola (Dallas, 1951)
- Thyanta picturata (Ruckes, 1957) (syn. by Rolston, 1972)

and finally, it is currently known as Cyptocephala antiguensis (Rolston and McDonald, 1984).
