= Banasa sordida =

Scientific classification
- Kingdom: Animalia
- Phylum: Arthropoda
- Clade: Pancrustacea
- Class: Insecta
- Order: Hemiptera
- Suborder: Heteroptera
- Family: Pentatomidae
- Tribe: Pentatomini
- Genus: Banasa
- Species: B. sordida

Binomial name
- Banasa sordida (Uhler, 1871)

Species of true bug

Banasa sordida is a species of stink bug in the family Pentatomidae, commonly known as the muddy stink bug. It is found in North America.

== Description ==
Adult muddy stink bugs are 1 - 1.1 cm (0.39 - 0.43 in) long, having a five-sided body shape characteristic of the superfamily Pentatomoidea. They come in various shades of dark brown with a lightly dimpled carapace, a distinctive white spot at the tip of their scutellum, and four rows of dark blotches on the underside of their (often lighter colored) abdomen. The dorsal side of their abdomen is black and displays a blue-green iridescence, which is hidden by their elytra when their wings are not in use.

== Behavior ==
=== Diet ===
The muddy stink bug has the piercing-sucking mouth parts characteristic of all Hemiptera, using its proboscis to penetrate plant tissues and feed on their fluids. They are known to feed on western hemlock and cypress trees.

== See also ==
- Stink bug
- Brown marmorated stink bug

B. sordida with partially open wings, exposing its iridescent abdomen.

B. sordida in motion, walking and briefly buzzing its wings.
