= Tepa rugulosa =

Scientific classification
- Domain: Eukaryota
- Kingdom: Animalia
- Phylum: Arthropoda
- Class: Insecta
- Order: Hemiptera
- Suborder: Heteroptera
- Family: Pentatomidae
- Genus: Tepa
- Species: T. rugulosa

Binomial name
- Tepa rugulosa (Say, 1832)

Synonyms
- Pentatoma rugulosa Say, 1832

Species of true bug

Tepa rugulosa is a species of stink bug in the family Pentatomidae. It is found in the Caribbean Sea, Central America, and North America.
