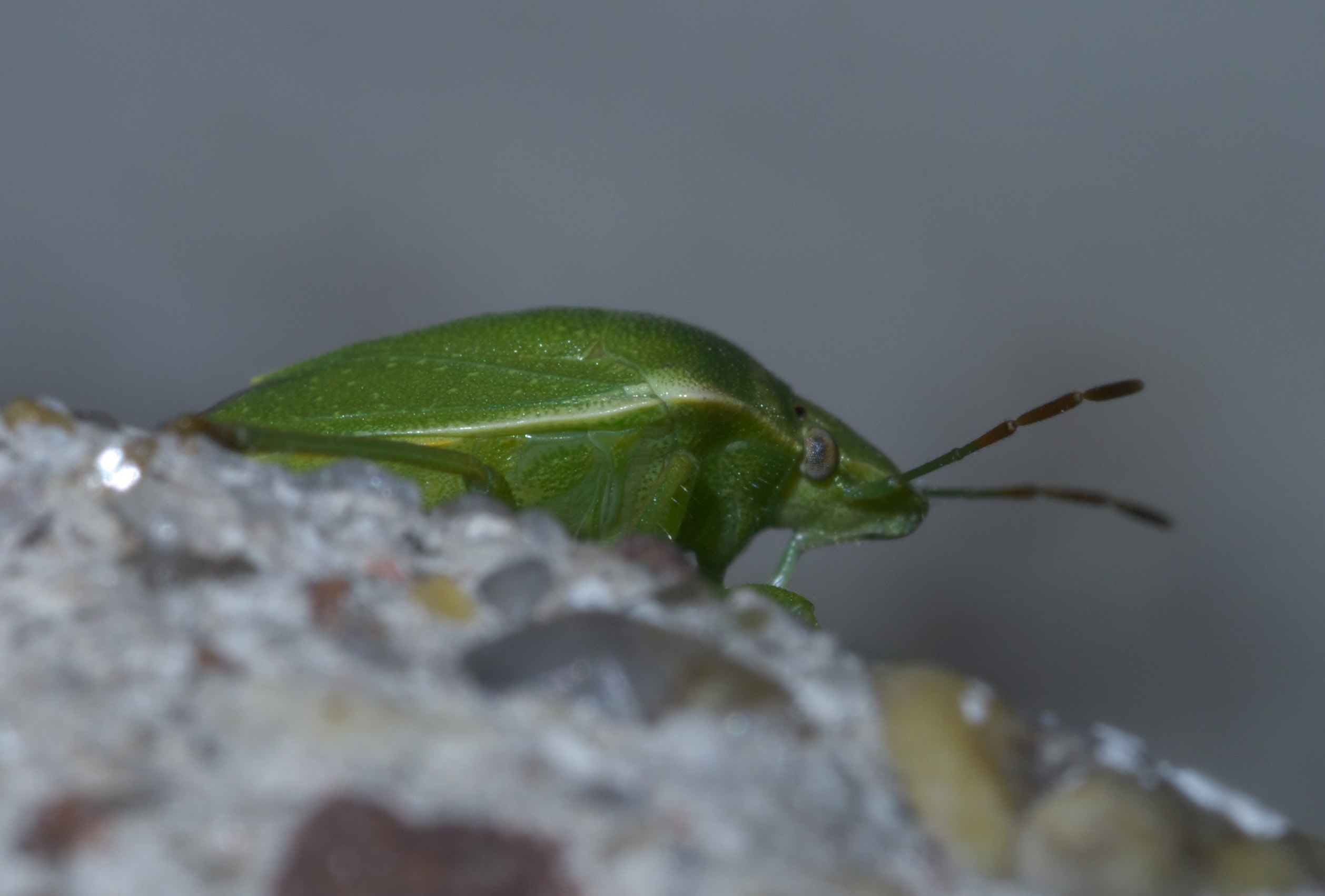
- T. custator accerra

Scientific classification
- Domain: Eukaryota
- Kingdom: Animalia
- Phylum: Arthropoda
- Class: Insecta
- Order: Hemiptera
- Suborder: Heteroptera
- Family: Pentatomidae
- Genus: Thyanta
- Species: T. custator

Binomial name
- Thyanta custator (Fabricius, 1803)

= Thyanta custator =

Species of true bug

Thyanta custator, commonly known as the red-shouldered stink bug, is a species of stink bug in the family Pentatomidae. It is found in North America.

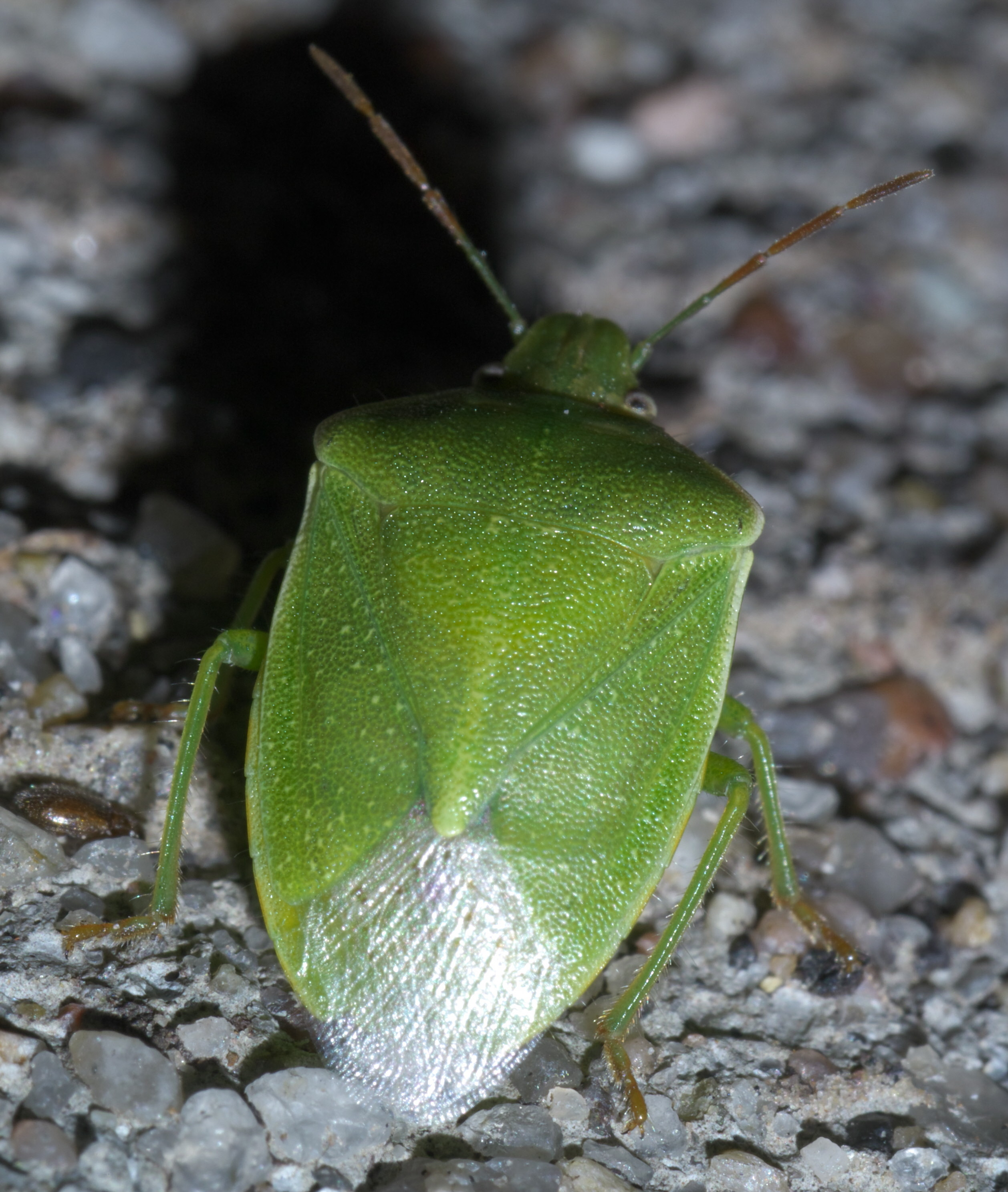
Red-shouldered stink bug, Thyanta custator

== Subspecies ==
These two subspecies belong to the species Thyanta custator:

- Thyanta custator accerra (redshouldered stink bug)
- Thyanta custator spinosa
