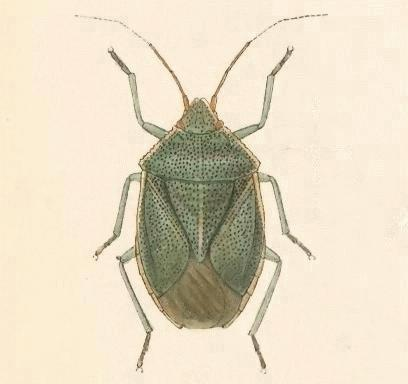

Scientific classification
- Domain: Eukaryota
- Kingdom: Animalia
- Phylum: Arthropoda
- Class: Insecta
- Order: Hemiptera
- Suborder: Heteroptera
- Family: Pentatomidae
- Genus: Chlorocoris
- Species: C. hebetatus

Binomial name
- Chlorocoris hebetatus Distant, 1890

= Chlorocoris hebetatus =

Species of true bug

Chlorocoris hebetatus is a species of stink bug in the family Pentatomidae. It is found in Central America and North America.
