= Tepa vanduzeei =

Scientific classification
- Domain: Eukaryota
- Kingdom: Animalia
- Phylum: Arthropoda
- Class: Insecta
- Order: Hemiptera
- Suborder: Heteroptera
- Family: Pentatomidae
- Genus: Tepa
- Species: T. vanduzeei

Binomial name
- Tepa vanduzeei Rider, 1986

Species of true bug

Tepa vanduzeei is a species of stink bug in the family Pentatomidae. It is found in Central America and North America.
