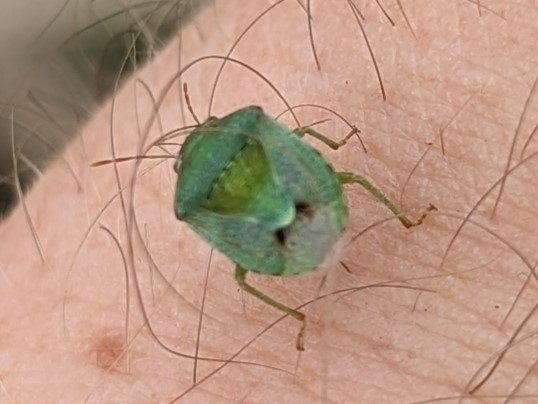

Scientific classification
- Domain: Eukaryota
- Kingdom: Animalia
- Phylum: Arthropoda
- Class: Insecta
- Order: Hemiptera
- Suborder: Heteroptera
- Family: Pentatomidae
- Genus: Tepa
- Species: T. brevis

Binomial name
- Tepa brevis (Van Duzee, 1904)

= Tepa brevis =

Species of true bug

Tepa brevis is a species of stink bug in the family Pentatomidae. It is found in Central and North America.
