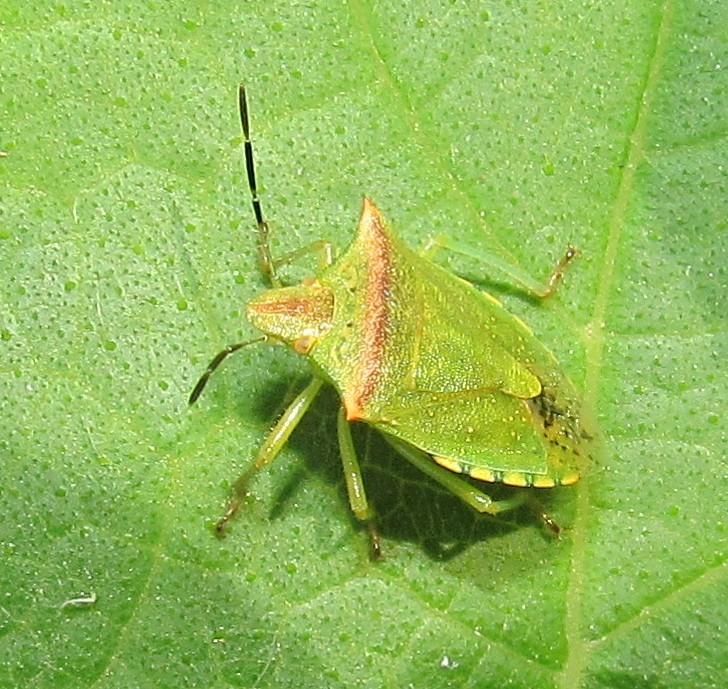

Scientific classification
- Domain: Eukaryota
- Kingdom: Animalia
- Phylum: Arthropoda
- Class: Insecta
- Order: Hemiptera
- Suborder: Heteroptera
- Family: Pentatomidae
- Genus: Thyanta
- Species: T. perditor

Binomial name
- Thyanta perditor (Fabricius, 1794)

Synonyms
- Cimex perditor Fabricius, 1794

= Thyanta perditor =

Species of true bug

Thyanta perditor, commonly known as the neotropical red-shouldered stink bug or red-shouldered stink bug, is a species of stink bug in the family Pentatomidae. It is found in the Caribbean, Central America, North America, and South America.
