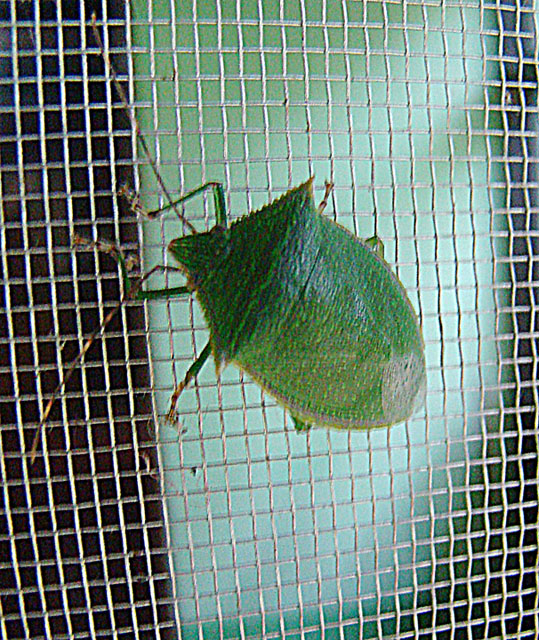

Scientific classification
- Domain: Eukaryota
- Kingdom: Animalia
- Phylum: Arthropoda
- Class: Insecta
- Order: Hemiptera
- Suborder: Heteroptera
- Family: Pentatomidae
- Genus: Loxa
- Species: L. flavicollis

Binomial name
- Loxa flavicollis (Drury, 1773)

Synonyms
- Cimex flavicollis Drury, 1773

= Loxa flavicollis =

Species of true bug

Loxa flavicollis is a species of stink bug in the family Pentatomidae. It is found in the Caribbean and North America.
