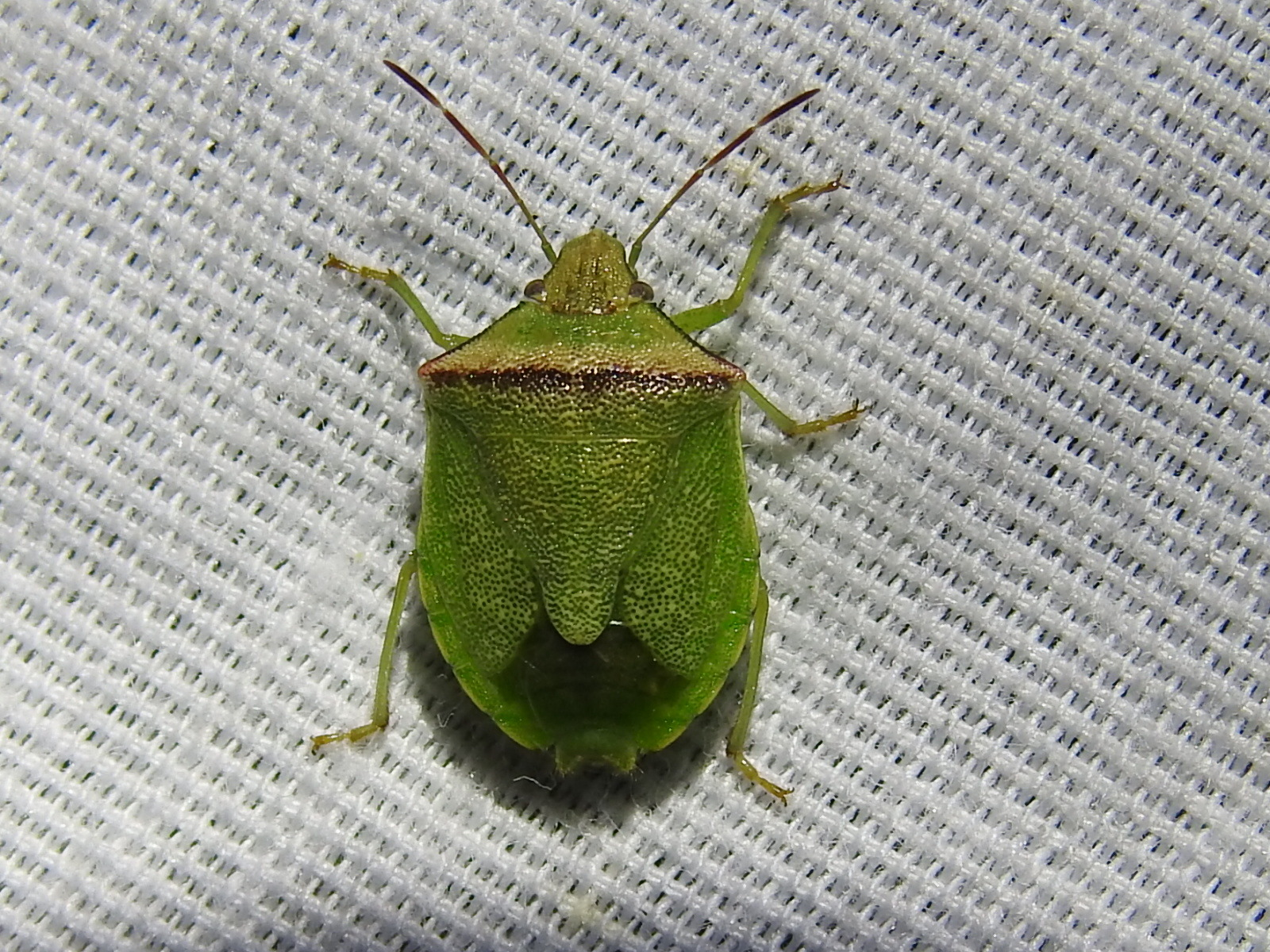

Scientific classification
- Domain: Eukaryota
- Kingdom: Animalia
- Phylum: Arthropoda
- Class: Insecta
- Order: Hemiptera
- Suborder: Heteroptera
- Family: Pentatomidae
- Genus: Thyanta
- Species: T. calceata

Binomial name
- Thyanta calceata (Say, 1832)

= Thyanta calceata =

Species of true bug

Thyanta calceata is a species of stink bug in the family Pentatomidae. It is found in North America.
