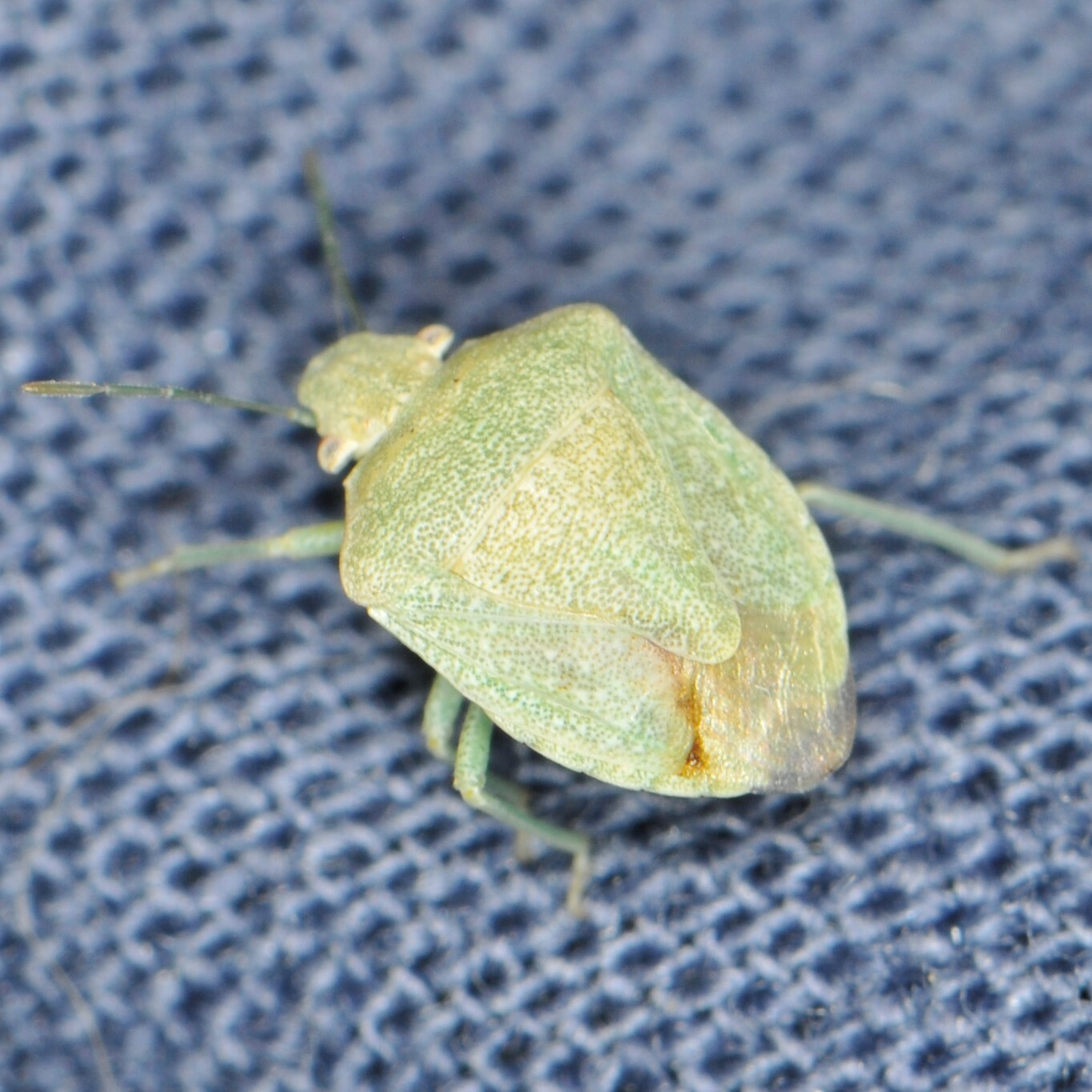

Scientific classification
- Domain: Eukaryota
- Kingdom: Animalia
- Phylum: Arthropoda
- Class: Insecta
- Order: Hemiptera
- Suborder: Heteroptera
- Family: Pentatomidae
- Tribe: Pentatomini
- Genus: Tepa; Rolston & McDonald, 1984

= Tepa (bug) =

Genus of true bugs

Tepa is a genus of stink bugs in the family Pentatomidae. There are about 6 described species in the genus Tepa.

== Species ==
- Tepa brevis (Van Duzee, 1904)
- Tepa jugosa (Van Duzee, 1923)
- Tepa panda (Van Duzee, 1923)
- Tepa rugulosa (Say, 1832)
- Tepa vanduzeei Rider, 1986
- Tepa yerma (Rolston, 1972)
