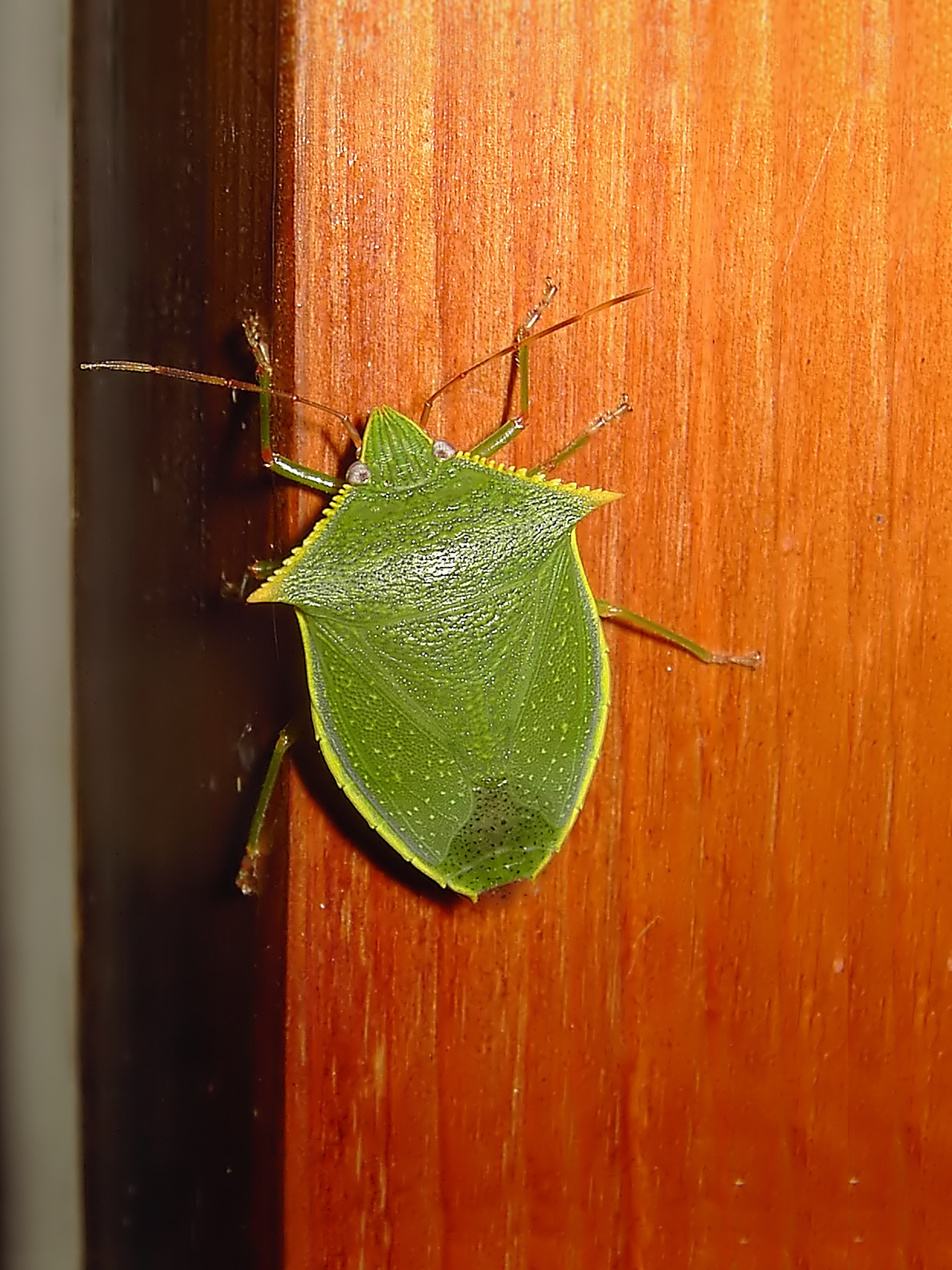
- At Woodfordhill, Dominica, West Indies

Scientific classification
- Kingdom: Animalia
- Phylum: Arthropoda
- Clade: Pancrustacea
- Class: Insecta
- Order: Hemiptera
- Suborder: Heteroptera
- Family: Pentatomidae
- Genus: Loxa
- Species: L. viridis

Binomial name
- Loxa viridis (Palisot, 1811)

= Loxa viridis =

Species of true bug

The Loxa viridis is a species of the family Pentatomidae.
