= Cyptocephala bimini =

Scientific classification
- Domain: Eukaryota
- Kingdom: Animalia
- Phylum: Arthropoda
- Class: Insecta
- Order: Hemiptera
- Suborder: Heteroptera
- Family: Pentatomidae
- Genus: Cyptocephala
- Species: C. bimini

Binomial name
- Cyptocephala bimini Ruches, 1952

Synonyms
- Thyanta bimini (Ruckes, 1952)

Species of stink bug

Cyptocephala bimini is a species of stink bug.

== Description ==
The antennae are usually a solid light green or tan color. Sometimes, the tip of the third segment and the last two segments are dark green. In rare cases, segments 4 and 5 have a broad, light reddish-brown band near the tip. The area behind the head (pronotum) does not have any noticeable markings or dips between the shoulders.

The sides of the head narrow slightly between the area in front of the eyes and the smoothly rounded tip. Its front edges are mostly straight, only slightly curved outward. The triangular plate on the back (scutellum) is about 30-38% of its base width at a specific point. The sides of the body (pleura) are smooth, without raised areas. The body length, not counting the wings, is between 6.5 and 8.8 mm.

The space between the 9th pair of body segments is about 1.5 to 2 times the length of the 10th segment. The base plates have a slight bump in the middle. A ridge on the sides of the genital area is partially visible inside, near the parameres (male reproductive structures). The lower edge of the parameres has a leaf-like shape.

Cyptocephala bimini looks very similar to Cyptocephala pallida, a related species that lives in similar areas. The main way to tell them apart is by their reproductive structures. However, they also have slight differences in antenna color, the shape of the head in front of the eyes, and the contour of the edges near the front of the pronotum.

== Range ==
This species lives in the Bahamas (including Cat Island, Long Island, Grand Bahama, Mayaguana, New Providence, Rum Cay, and South Bimini), as well as in Cuba, the Dominican Republic, Florida (Dade and Monroe counties), Jamaica, and Puerto Rico.

== Taxonomy ==
Originally described as Thyanta bimini by Ruckes in 1952.
