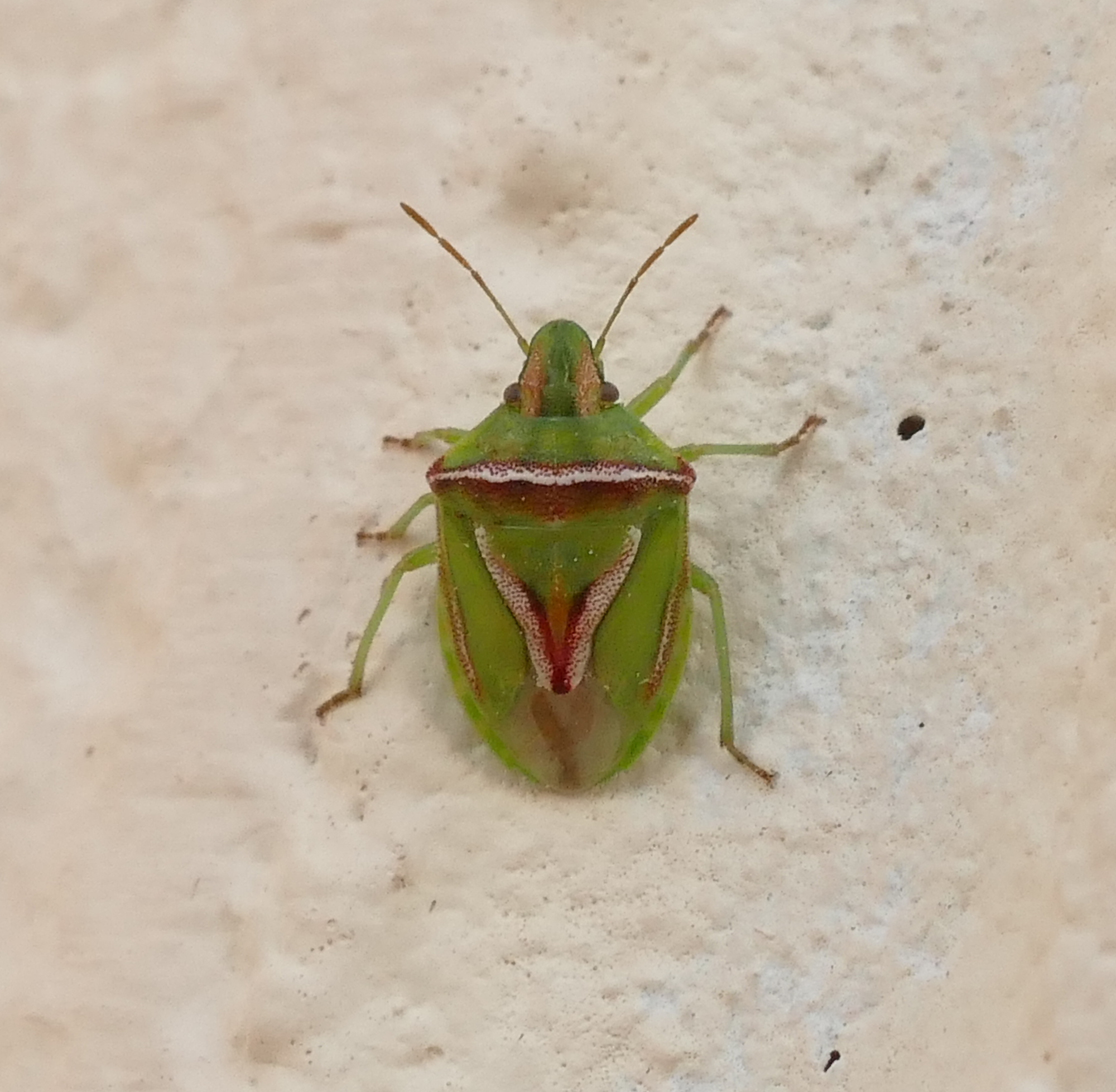

Scientific classification
- Domain: Eukaryota
- Kingdom: Animalia
- Phylum: Arthropoda
- Class: Insecta
- Order: Hemiptera
- Suborder: Heteroptera
- Family: Pentatomidae
- Genus: Cyptocephala
- Species: C. elegans

Binomial name
- Cyptocephala elegans (Malloch, 1919)

= Cyptocephala elegans =

Species of true bug

Cyptocephala elegans is a species of shield bugs in the tribe Pentatomini.
