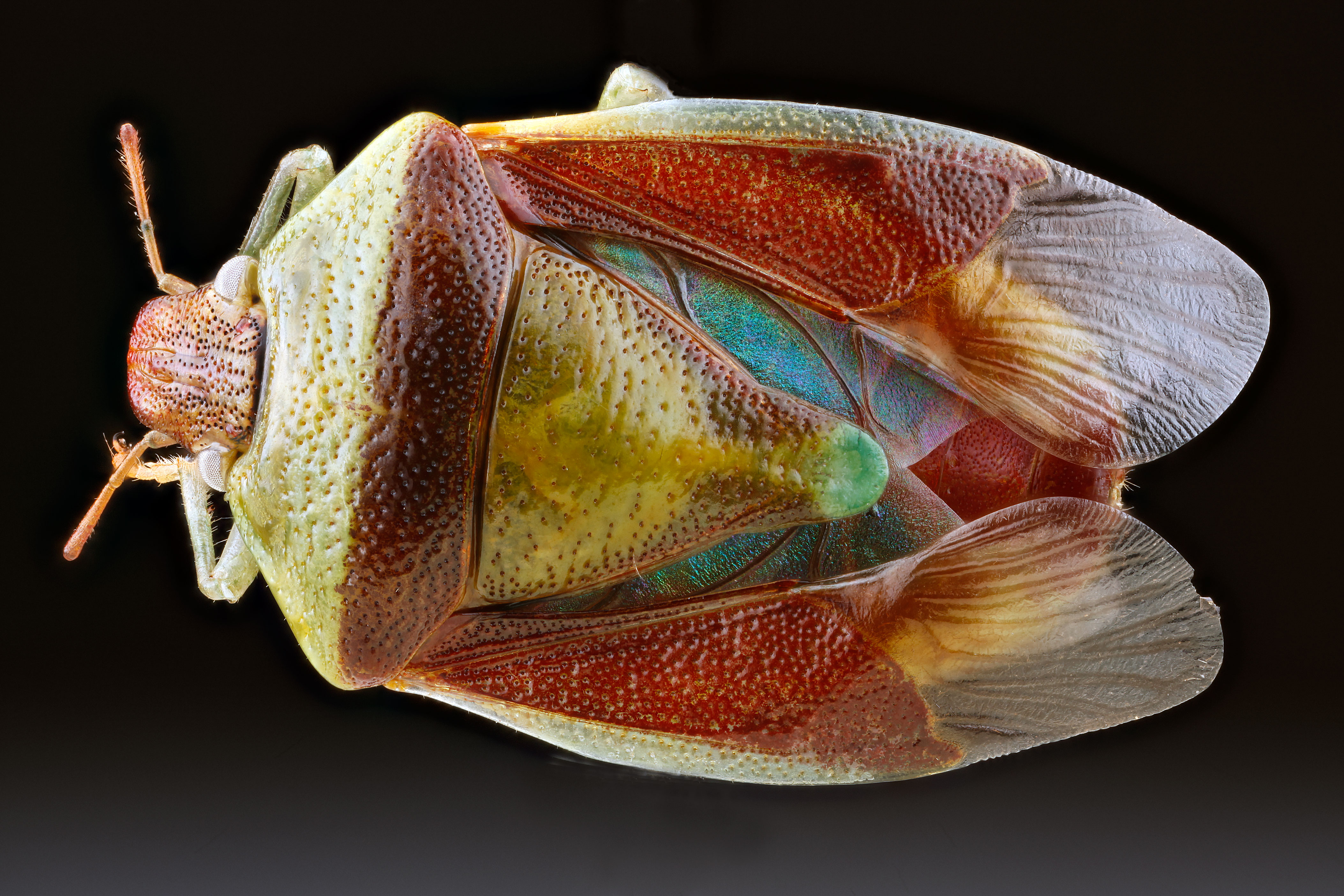
- Banasa dimiata

Scientific classification
- Kingdom: Animalia
- Phylum: Arthropoda
- Clade: Pancrustacea
- Class: Insecta
- Order: Hemiptera
- Suborder: Heteroptera
- Family: Pentatomidae
- Subfamily: Pentatominae
- Tribe: Pentatomini
- Genus: Banasa; Stål, 1860

Species
- See text

= Banasa (bug) =

Genus of true bugs

Banasa is a genus of plant feeding stink bugs in the family Pentatomidae.

== Species ==
Banasa contains the following species:

- Banasa azteca Thomas
- Banasa calva (Say, 1832)
- Banasa dimidiata (Say, 1832) (green burgundy stink bug)
- Banasa dolobrata Thomas
- Banasa euchlora Stål, 1872 (juniper stink bug)
- Banasa excavata Thomas
- Banasa flavosa Thomas, 2005
- Banasa grisea Ruckes, 1957
- Banasa herbacea (Stål, 1872)
- Banasa induta Stål, 1860
- Banasa lenticularis Uhler, 1894
- Banasa packardii Stål, 1872
- Banasa rolstoni Thomas & Yonke, 1981
- Banasa salvini Distant, 1911
- Banasa sordida (Uhler, 1871)
- Banasa stalii
- Banasa subcarnea Van Duzee, 1935
- Banasa tumidifrons Thomas & Yonke, 1981
