= Banasa lenticularis =

Scientific classification
- Domain: Eukaryota
- Kingdom: Animalia
- Phylum: Arthropoda
- Class: Insecta
- Order: Hemiptera
- Suborder: Heteroptera
- Family: Pentatomidae
- Genus: Banasa
- Species: B. lenticularis

Binomial name
- Banasa lenticularis Uhler, 1894

Species of true bug

Banasa lenticularis is a species of stink bug in the family Pentatomidae. It is found in the Caribbean, Central America, North America, and South America.
