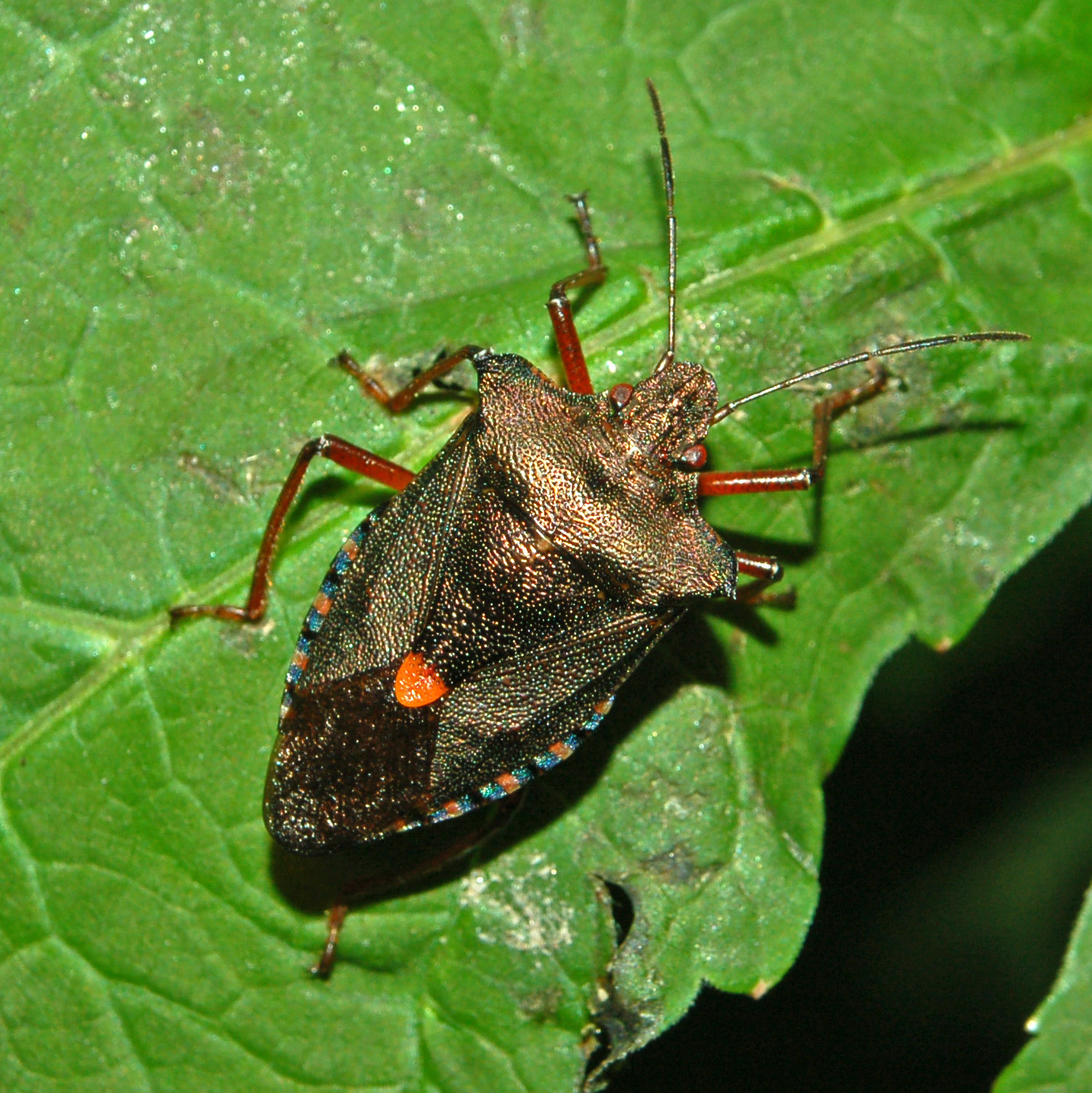
- Adult of Pentatoma rufipes

Scientific classification
- Kingdom: Animalia
- Phylum: Arthropoda
- Clade: Pancrustacea
- Class: Insecta
- Order: Hemiptera
- Suborder: Heteroptera
- Family: Pentatomidae
- Subfamily: Pentatominae
- Tribe: Pentatomini
- Genus: Pentatoma (Guillaume-Antoine Olivier, 1789)

= Pentatoma =

Genus of true bugs

Pentatoma is a genus of shield bugs in the family Pentatomidae.

== Species ==
Species within this genus include:

- Pentatoma angulata Hsiao & Cheng
- Pentatoma illuminata
- Pentatoma japonica
- Pentatoma kunmingensis Xiong
- Pentatoma metallifera
- Pentatoma parataibaiensis Liu & Zheng, 1995
- Pentatoma rufipes (Linnaeus, 1758) – forest bug or red-legged shieldbug; type species
- Pentatoma semiannulata
- Pentatoma viridicornuta He & Zheng, 2006
