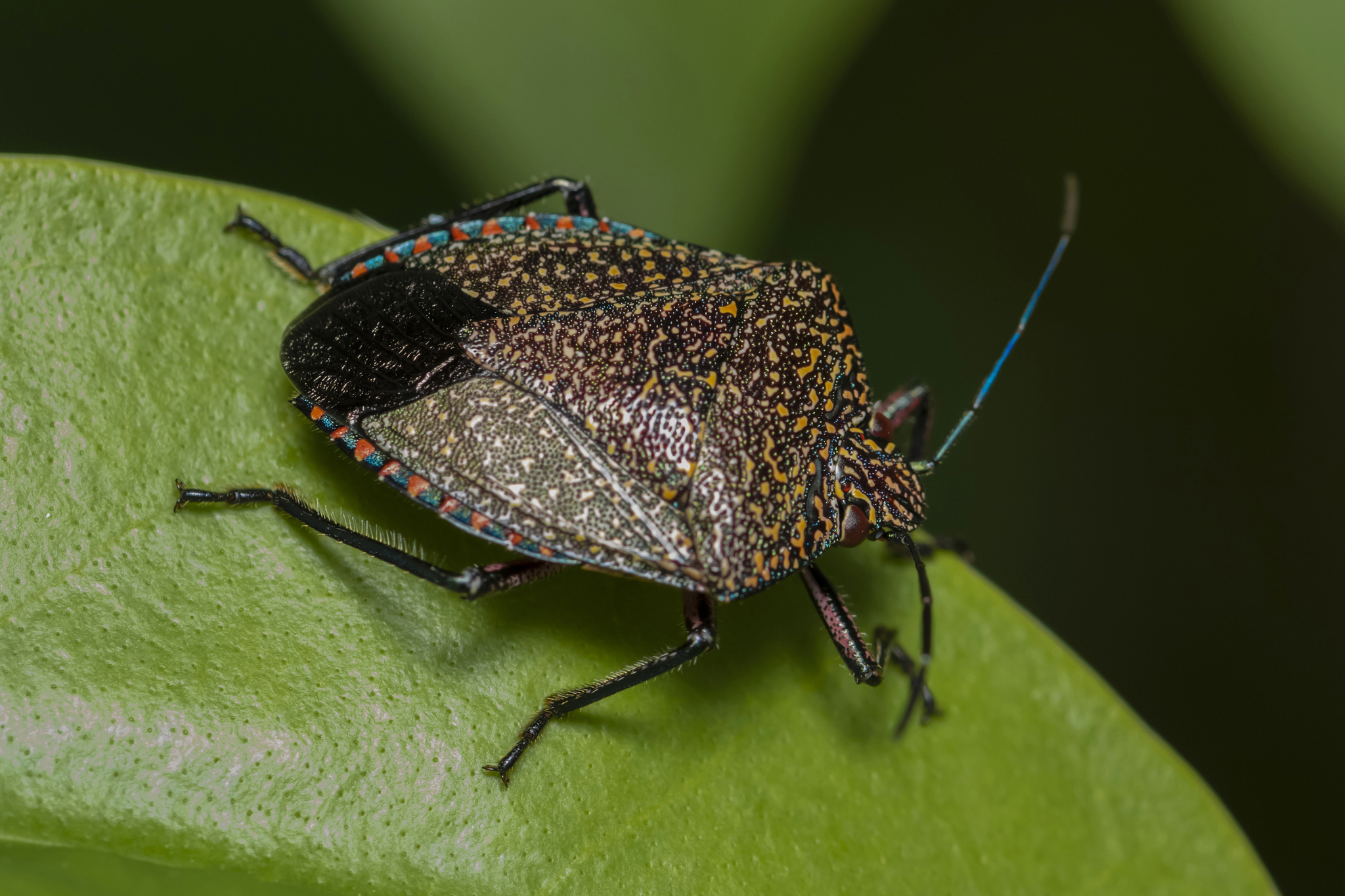

Scientific classification
- Kingdom: Animalia
- Phylum: Arthropoda
- Class: Insecta
- Order: Hemiptera
- Suborder: Heteroptera
- Family: Pentatomidae
- Genus: Pellaea
- Species: P. stictica

Binomial name
- Pellaea stictica Dallas, 1851

Synonyms
- Pentatoma aspera Pellaea candens

= Pellaea stictica =

Species of stink bug

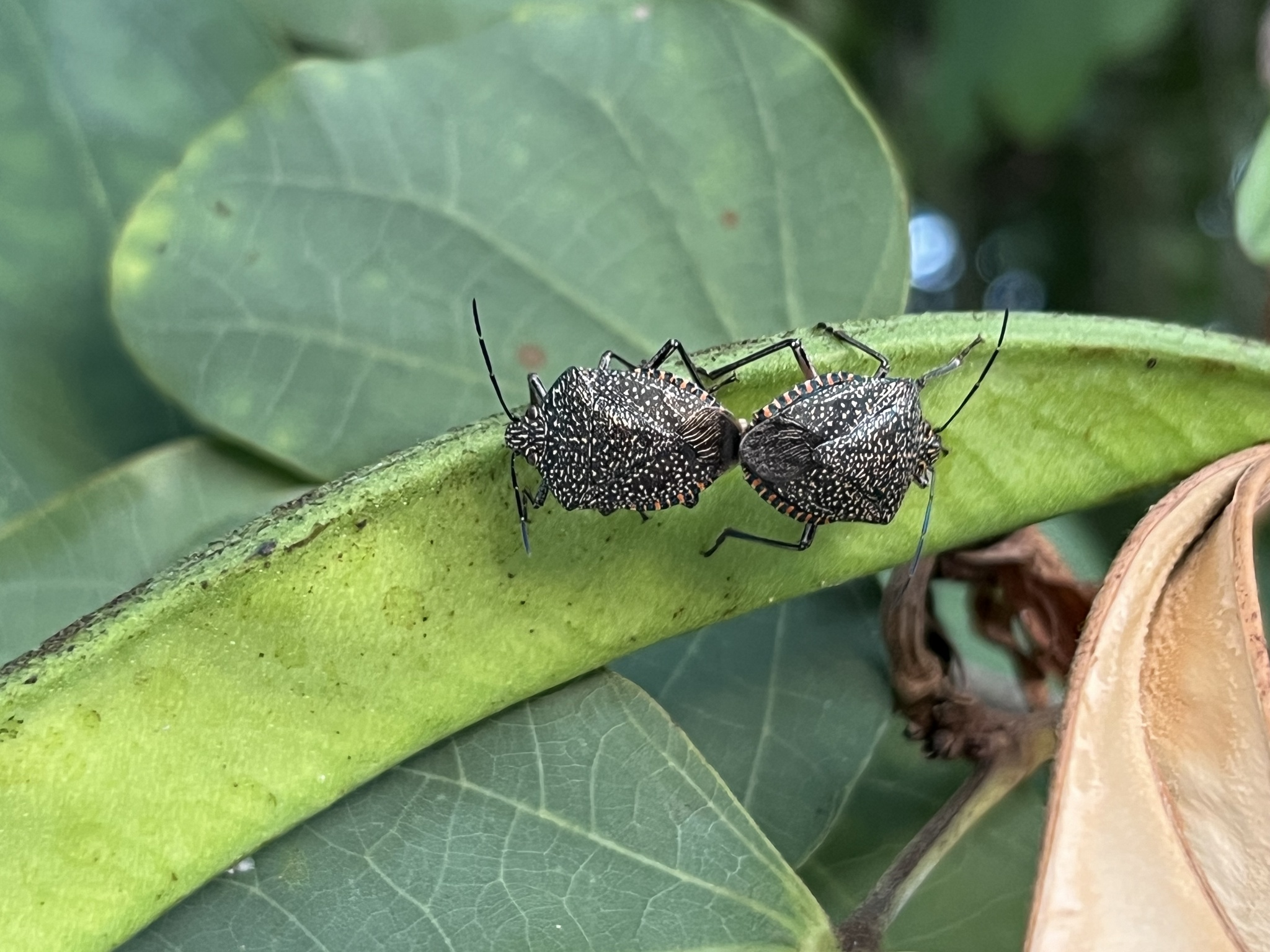
A pair of Pellaea stictica bugs mating.

Pellaea stictica is a species of stink bug found in temperate areas of the Western Hemisphere, including North America, South America, and the Caribbean. The adults and nymphs are both considered edible insects in Mexico. This species was first described to science in 1851. Its distribution north of Mexico has only recently (as of 2021) extended to California, having previously only been known from Texas.
