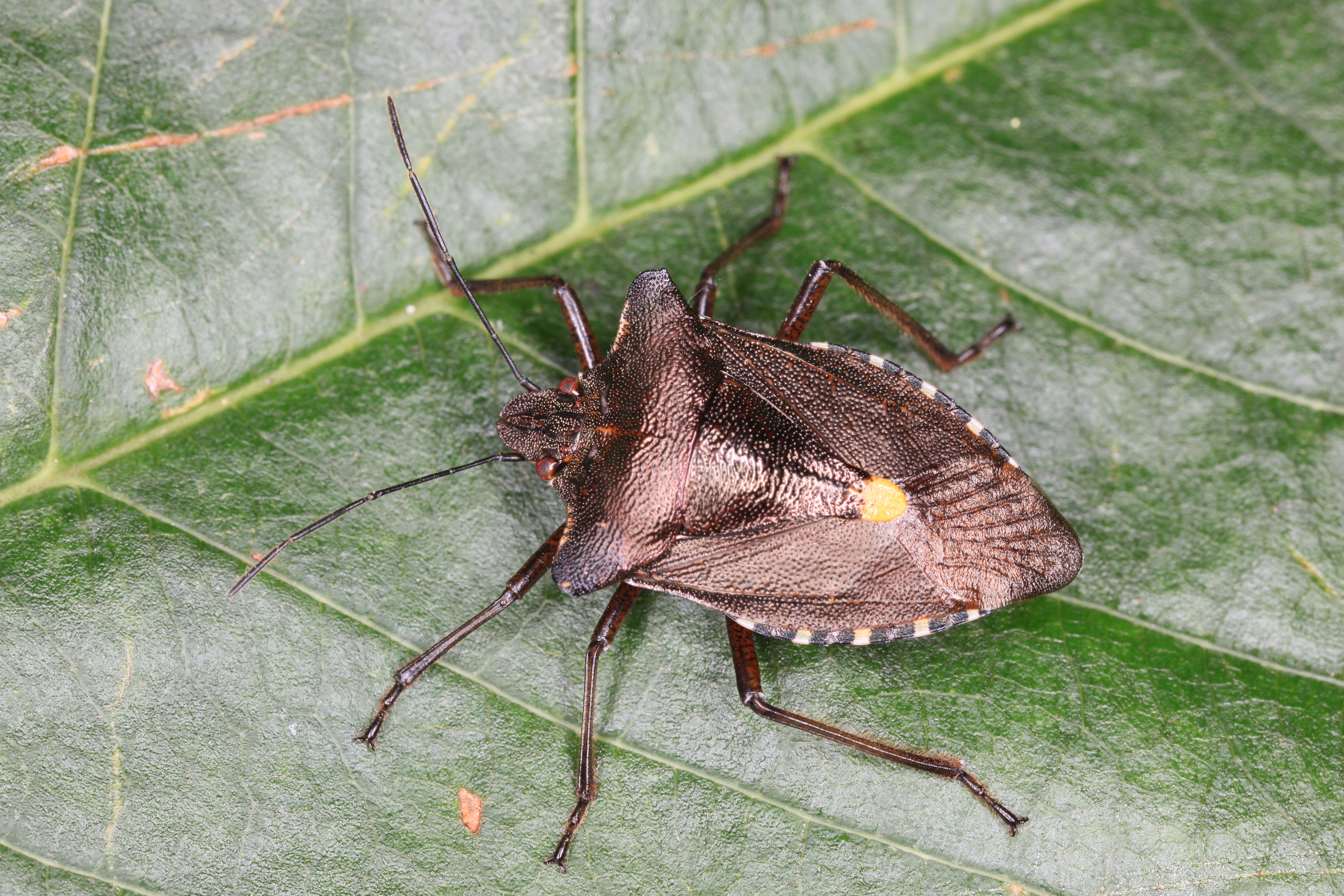

Scientific classification
- Kingdom: Animalia
- Phylum: Arthropoda
- Class: Insecta
- Order: Hemiptera
- Suborder: Heteroptera
- Family: Pentatomidae
- Genus: Pentatoma
- Species: P. rufipes

Binomial name
- Pentatoma rufipes (Linnaeus, 1758)

= Forest bug =

Species of true bug

The forest bug or red-legged shieldbug (Pentatoma rufipes) is a species of shield bug in the family Pentatomidae, commonly found in most of Europe. It inhabits forests, woodlands, orchards, and gardens.

== Description ==
P. rufipes can reach a length of 11–14 mm (0.43–0.55 in). These large and flat shield bugs are shaped like an escutcheon-type shield. They have a dark brown body in autumn, lighter in summer, usually bronze-colored. They show red-orange to cream markings at the tip of their scutella. The legs and the first segment of the antennae are usually red-brown or bright orange. Its distinguishing characteristic is a pair of projections extending forward from the shoulders at the front of its dorsal thorax. The larvae are dark, but become lighter, especially at the hind body, with increasing age.

== Biology ==
Forest bugs are polyphagous. Their main food source is any of several species of oaks, but they can also be found on alder, hazel, and other deciduous trees, including apple and cherry.

They are sap-feeders and use piercing mouthparts to withdraw the liquid. Occasionally, adults consume insects, especially caterpillars, as well as fruits. Adults can be found from July to November. Females lay eggs during the summer in the cracks of tree bark, or on a leaf top, and the larvae hatch the following spring. Forest bugs are also an agricultural and garden pest, as they feed on fruit and nut trees.

== Gallery ==
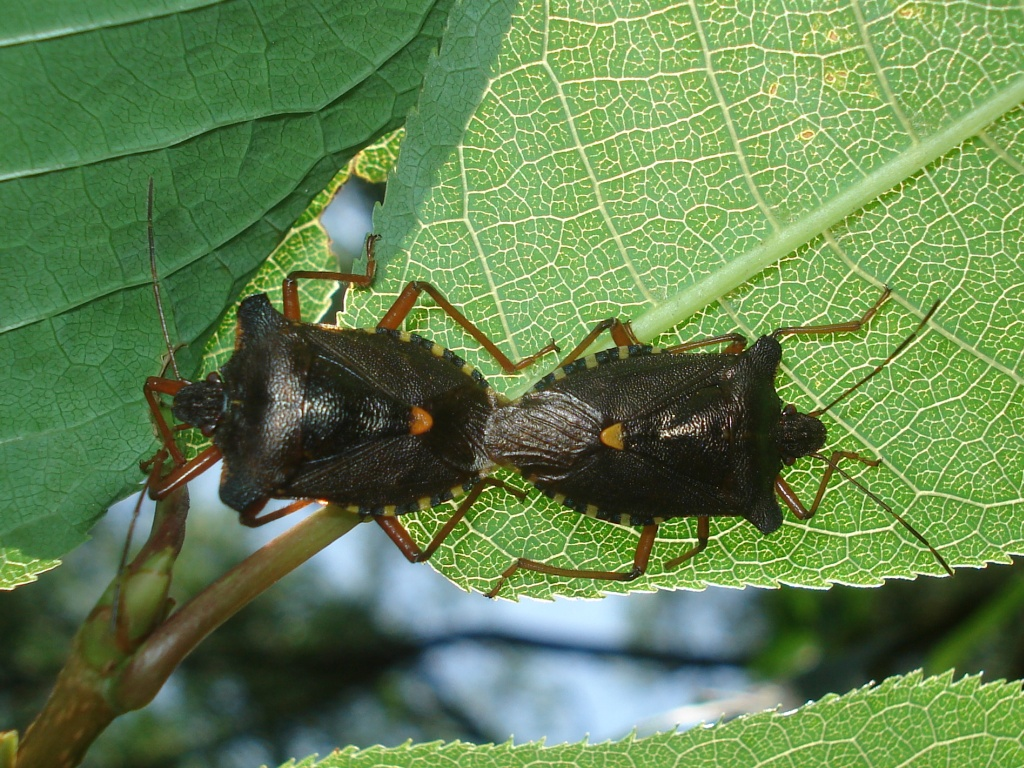
Mating pair

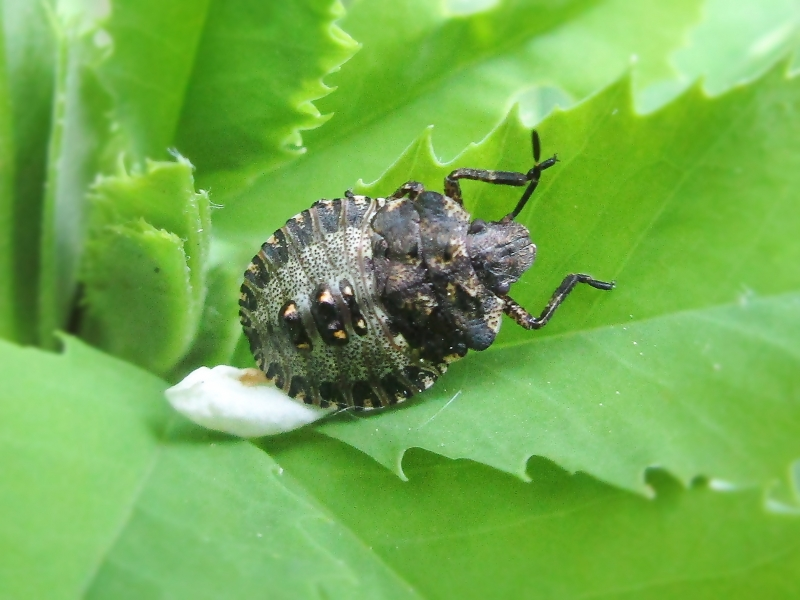
Young nymph

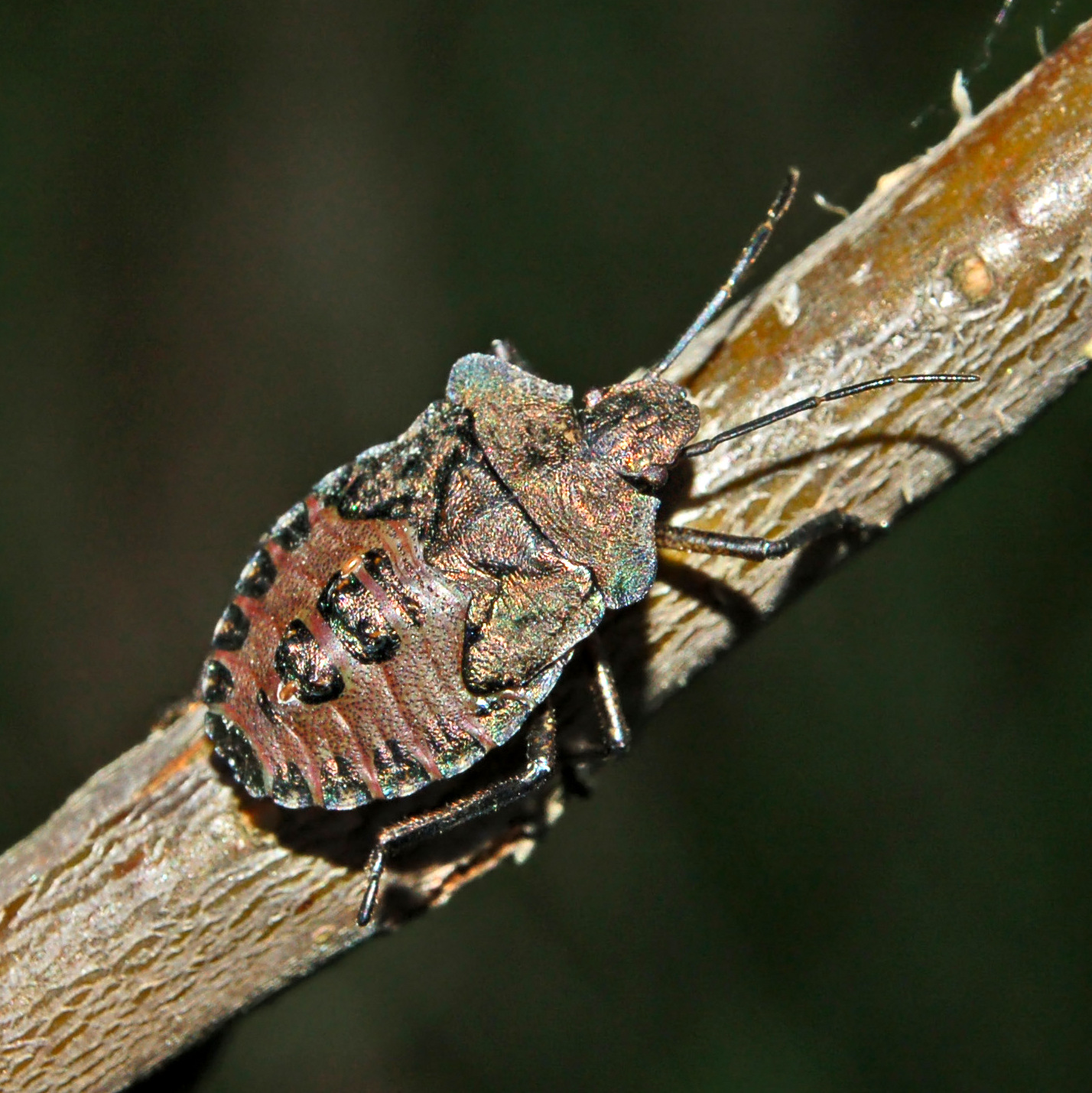
Final-instar nymph

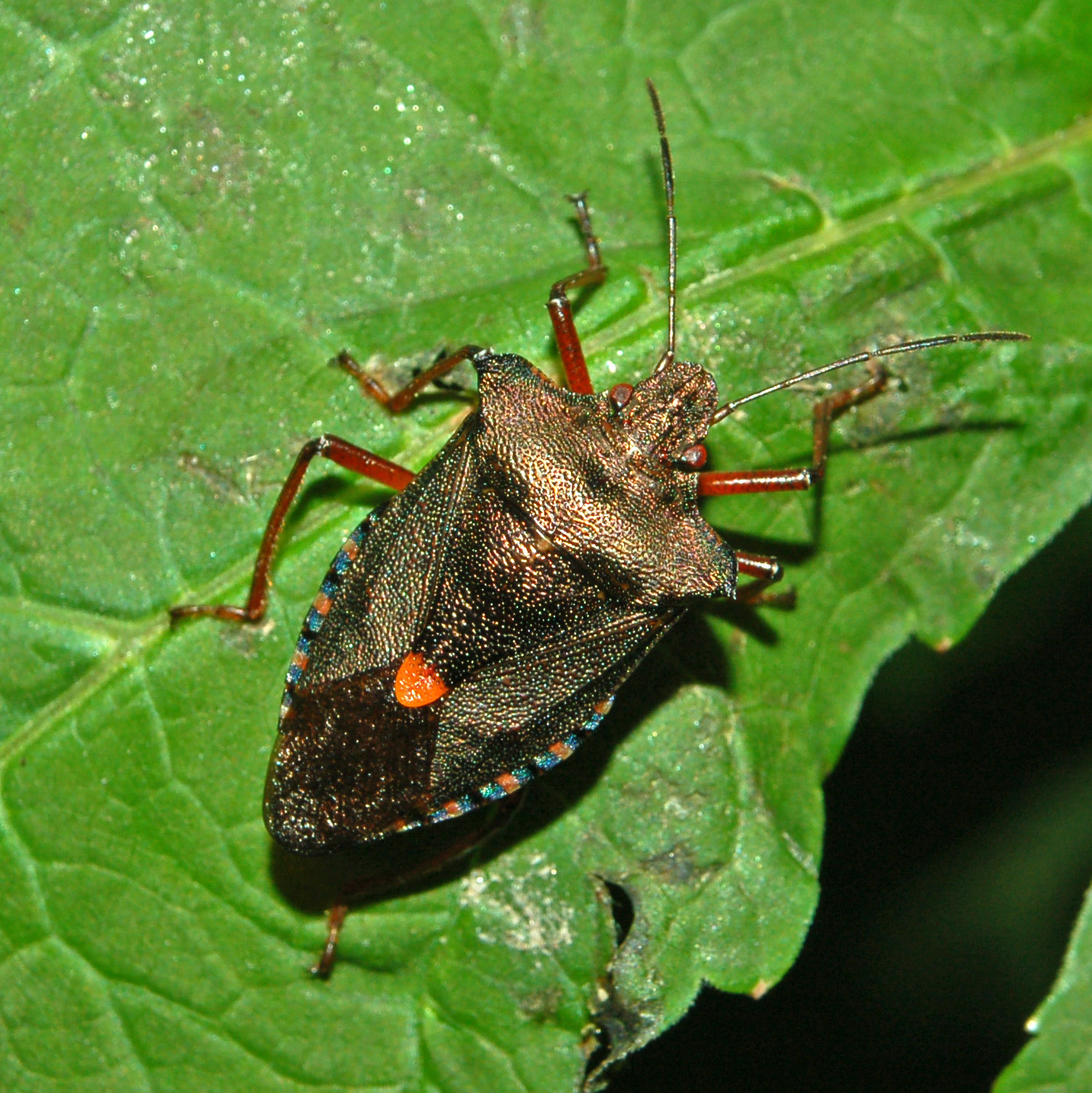
Adult
