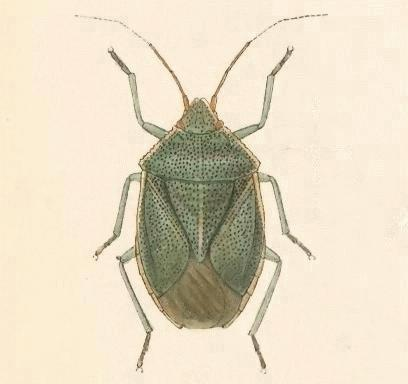
- Chlorocoris hebetatus

Scientific classification
- Kingdom: Animalia
- Phylum: Arthropoda
- Clade: Pancrustacea
- Class: Insecta
- Order: Hemiptera
- Suborder: Heteroptera
- Family: Pentatomidae
- Tribe: Chlorocorini
- Genus: Chlorocoris; Spinola, 1837

= Chlorocoris =

Genus of true bugs

Chlorocoris is a genus of stink bugs in the family Pentatomidae. Described species of Chlorocoris have been recorded from the Americas.

== Species ==
These six species belong to the genus Chlorocoris:

- Chlorocoris distinctus Signoret, 1851^{i c g b}
- Chlorocoris flaviviridis Barber, 1914^{i c g}
- Chlorocoris hebetatus Distant, 1890^{i c g b}
- Chlorocoris subrugosus Stål, 1872^{i c g}
- Chlorocoris tau Spinola, 1837^{i c g}
- Chlorocoris werneri^{b}

Data sources: i = ITIS, c = Catalogue of Life, g = GBIF, b = Bugguide.net
