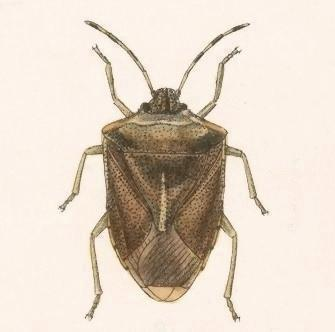
- Thyanta casta

Scientific classification
- Kingdom: Animalia
- Phylum: Arthropoda
- Clade: Pancrustacea
- Class: Insecta
- Order: Hemiptera
- Suborder: Heteroptera
- Family: Pentatomidae
- Subfamily: Pentatominae
- Tribe: Pentatomini
- Genus: Thyanta; Stål, 1860

= Thyanta =

Genus of true bugs

Thyanta is a genus of stink bugs in the family Pentatomidae. There are about 19 described species in Thyanta.

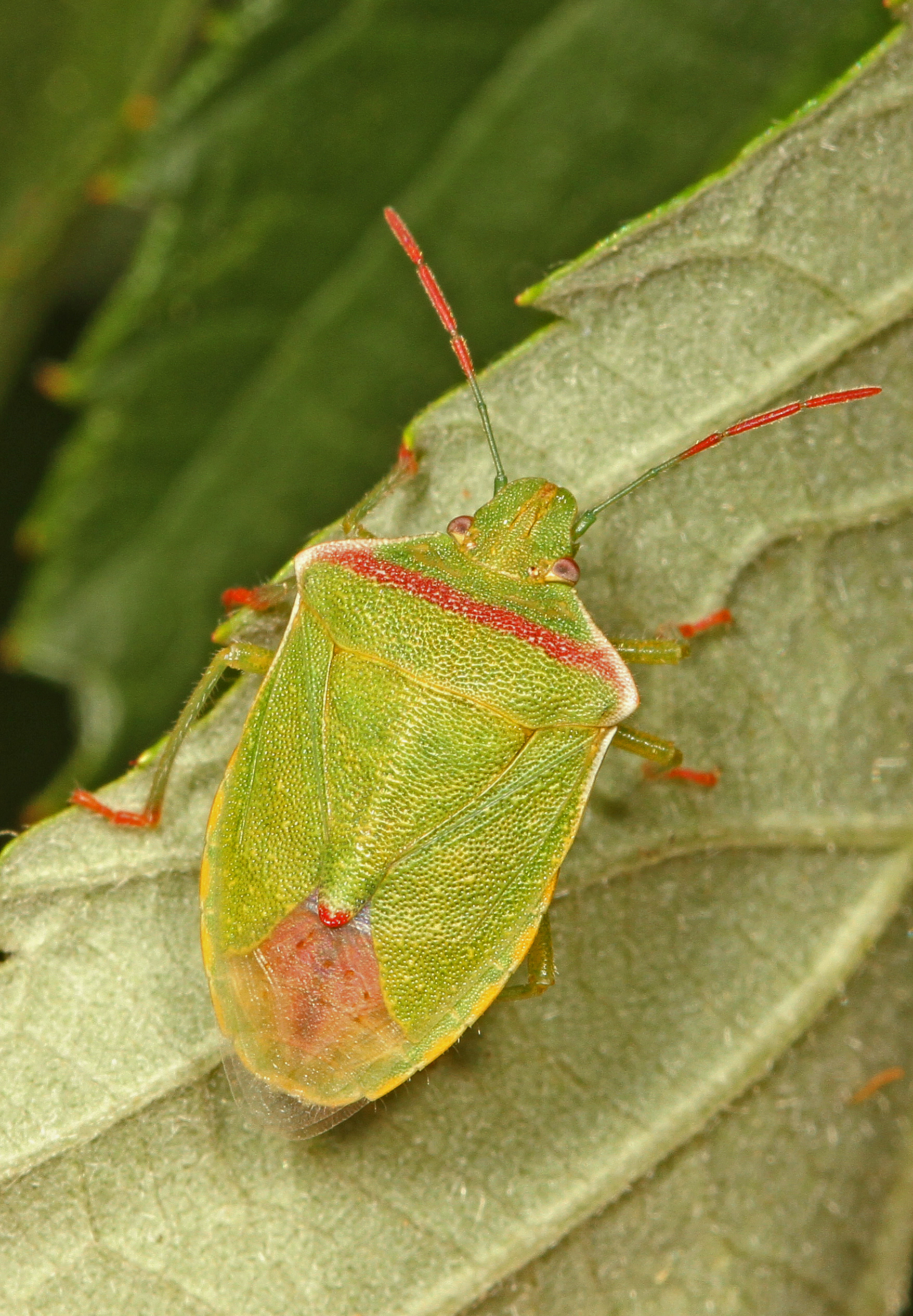
Thyanta pallidovirens

== Species ==
These 19 species belong to the genus Thyanta:

- Thyanta accerra McAtee, 1919
- Thyanta boliviensis Rider
- Thyanta brasiliensis Jensen-Haarup, 1928
- Thyanta calceata (Say, 1832)
- Thyanta casta Stål, 1862
- Thyanta cubensis Barber & Bruner
- Thyanta custator (Fabricius, 1803) (red-shouldered stink bug)
- Thyanta emarginata Rider
- Thyanta humilis
- Thyanta maculata
- Thyanta pallidovirens (Stål, 1859) (red-shouldered stink bug)
- Thyanta patruelis Stal, 1859
- Thyanta perditor (Fabricius, 1794) (neotropical red-shouldered stink bug)
- Thyanta pseudocasta Blatchley, 1926
- Thyanta punctiventris Van Duzee
- Thyanta sinuata Rider
- Thyanta spectabilis Ruckes, 1957
- Thyanta testacea (Dallas, 1851)
- Thyanta xerotica Rider
