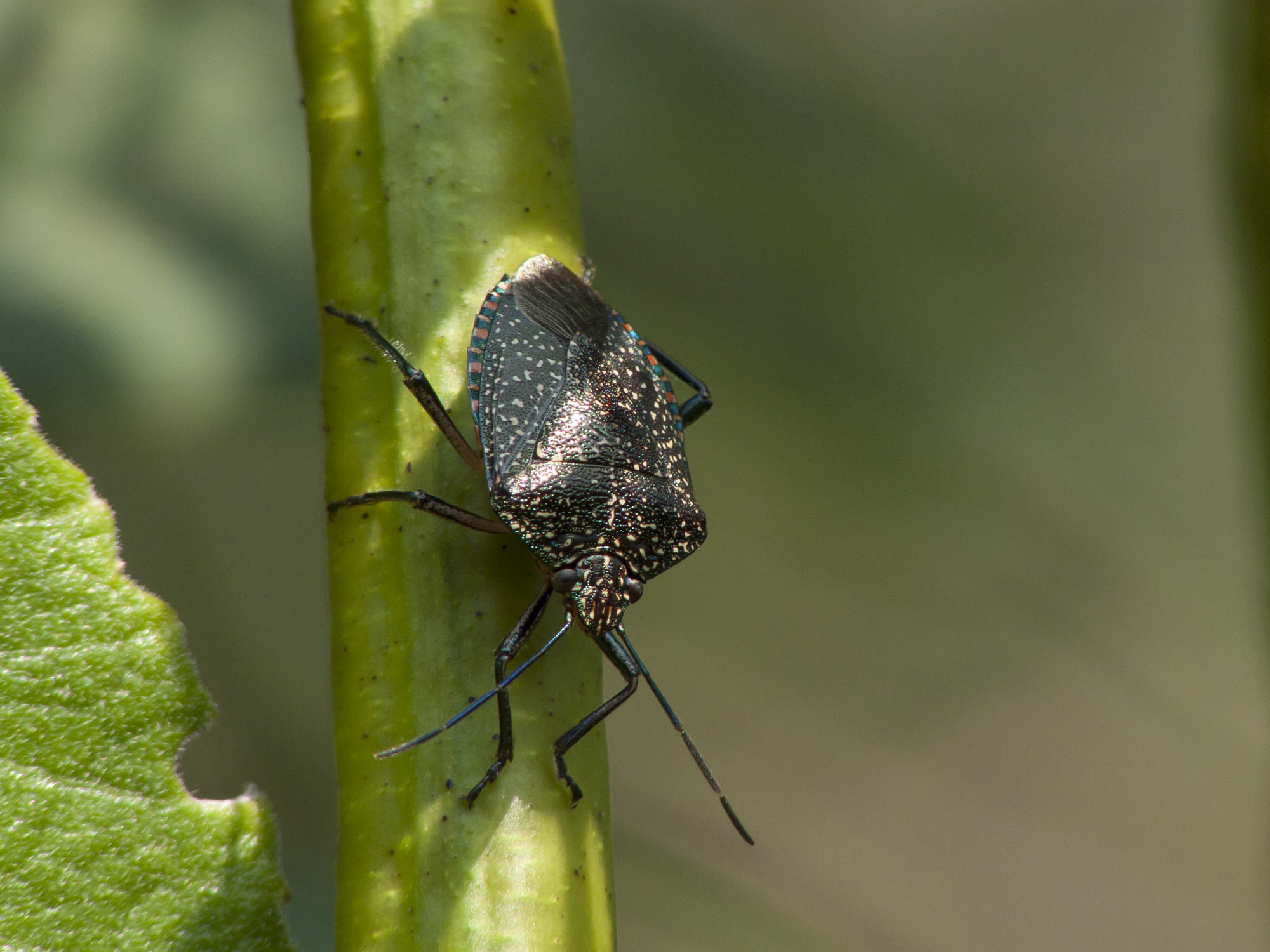
- Pellaea stictica

Scientific classification
- Kingdom: Animalia
- Phylum: Arthropoda
- Clade: Pancrustacea
- Class: Insecta
- Order: Hemiptera
- Suborder: Heteroptera
- Family: Pentatomidae
- Tribe: Pentatomini
- Genus: Pellaea; Stål, 1872

= Pellaea (bug) =

Genus of true bugs

Pellaea is a genus of stink bugs in the family Pentatomidae.

There are at least two described species in this genus: Pellaea stictica and Pellaea santarosenesis.
