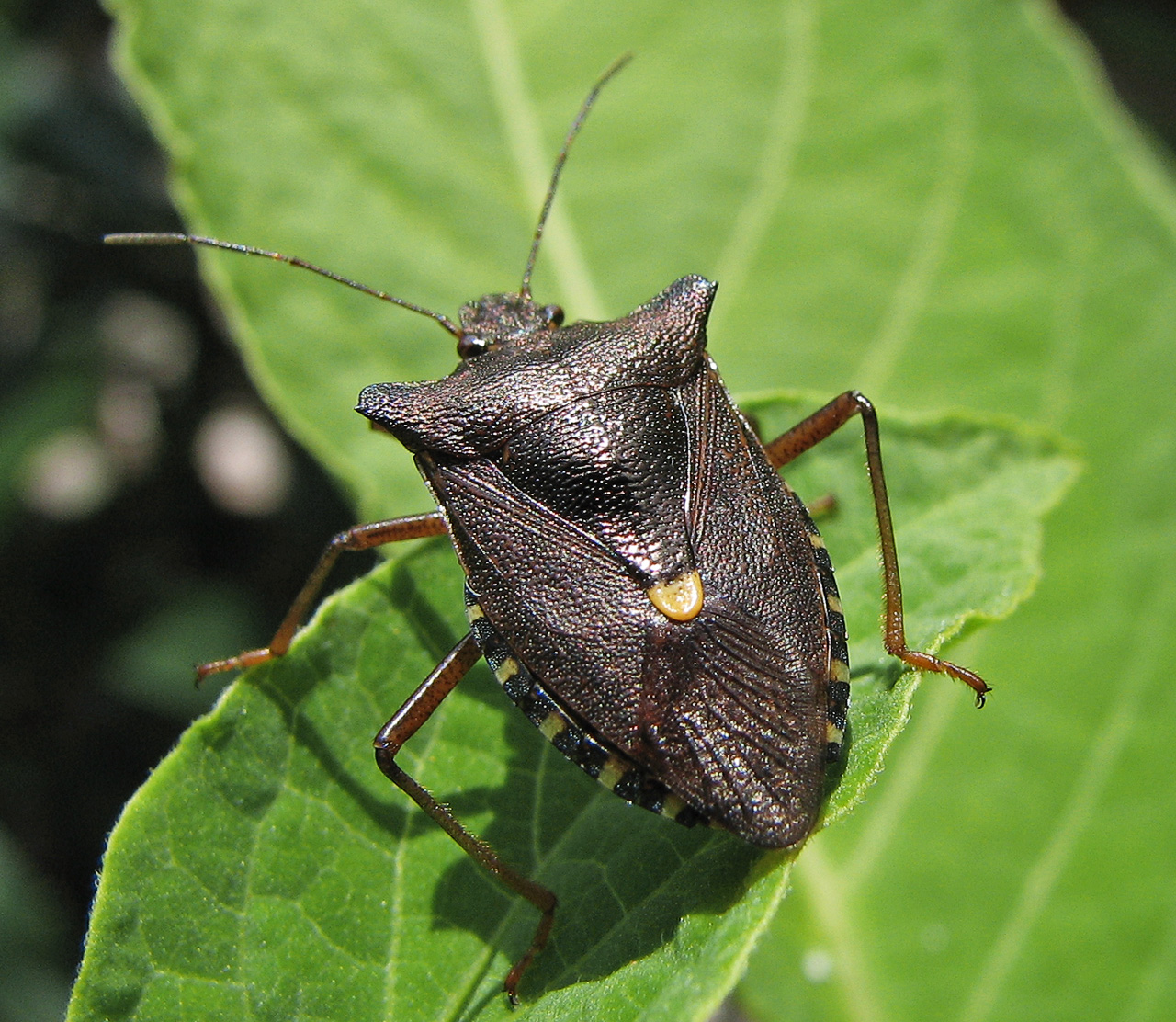
- Pentatoma rufipes

Scientific classification
- Kingdom: Animalia
- Phylum: Arthropoda
- Class: Insecta
- Order: Hemiptera
- Suborder: Heteroptera
- Family: Pentatomidae
- Subfamily: Pentatominae
- Tribe: Pentatomini; Leach, 1815

Genera
- See text

= Pentatomini =

Tribe of true bugs

Pentatomini is a tribe of shield bugs in the subfamily of Pentatominae.

== Genera ==
BioLib includes:

1. Acrocorisellus Puton, 1886
2. Adevoplitus Grazia & Becker, 1997
3. Ahmadiana Ahmad, Kamaluddin & Abbasi, 1977
4. Amblycara Bergroth, 1891
5. Amirantea Distant, 1909
6. Banasa (bug) Stål, 1860
7. Bifurcipentatoma Fan & Liu, 2012
8. Brasilania Jensen-Haarup, 1931
9. Capivaccius Distant, 1893
10. Catalampusa Breddin, 1903
11. Cervicoris Hsiao & Cheng, 1977
12. Chrysodarecus Breddin, 1903
13. Cyptocephala Berg, 1883
14. Disderia Bergroth, 1910
15. Elsiella Froeschner, 1981
16. Evoplitus Amyot & Serville, 1843
17. Glaucioides Thomas, 1980
18. Grazia (bug) Rolston, 1981
19. Hyrmine (bug) Stål, 1876
20. Iphiarusa Breddin, 1904
21. Janeirona Distant, 1911
22. Kaschmirocoris Lindberg, 1939
23. Kermana Rolston, 1981
24. Lelia (bug) Walker, 1867
25. Leovitius Distant, 1900
26. Loxa Amyot & Serville, 1843
27. Marghita (bug) Ruckes, 1964
28. Modicia Stål, 1872
29. Myota Spinola, 1850
30. Neojurtina Distant, 1921
31. Neotibilis Grazia & Barcellos, 1994
32. Nocheta Rolston, 1980
33. Okeanos Distant, 1911
34. Pallantia (bug) Stål, 1862
35. Paratibilis Ruckes, 1960
36. Parvacrena Ruckes, 1963
37. Pellaea (bug) Stål, 1872
38. Pentatoma Olivier, 1789 - type genus
39. Phalaecus (bug) Stål, 1862
40. Pharypia Stål, 1861
41. Placocoris Mayr, 1864
42. Placosternum Amyot & Serville, 1843
43. Priassus Stål, 1867
44. Prionaca Dallas, 1851
45. Prionocompastes Breddin, 1900
46. Pseudevoplitus Ruckes, 1958
47. Ramivena Fan & G.Q. Liu, 2010
48. Ramosiana Kormilev, 1950
49. Rhaphigaster Laporte, 1833
50. Rideriana Grazia & Frey-da-Silva, 2003
51. Sabaeus Stål, 1867
52. Serdia Stål, 1860
53. Similliserdia Fortes & Grazia, 1998
54. Stictochilus Bergroth, 1918
55. Taurocerus Amyot & Serville, 1843
56. Tepa (bug) Rolston & McDonald, 1984
57. Thyanta Stål, 1862
58. Tibilis Stål, 1860
59. Topesocoris Munguia-Grillo, 1991
60. Vidada Rolston, 1980
61. Zhengica Rédei & Tsai, 2021
62. Zhengius Rider, 1998
