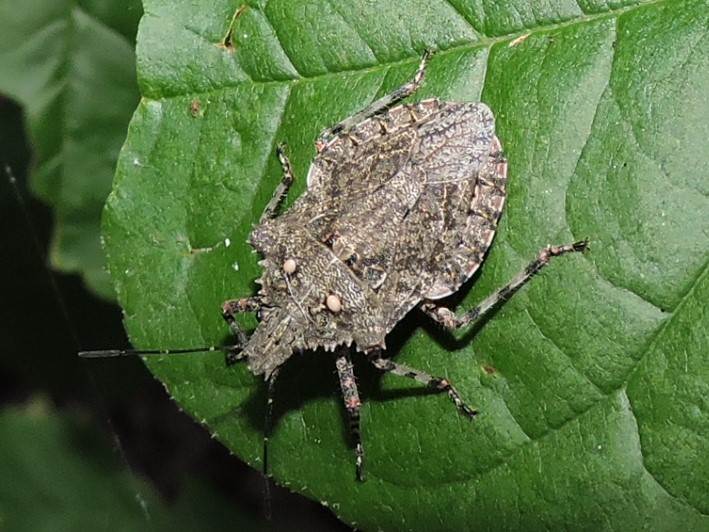

Scientific classification
- Kingdom: Animalia
- Phylum: Arthropoda
- Class: Insecta
- Order: Hemiptera
- Suborder: Heteroptera
- Family: Pentatomidae
- Tribe: Halyini
- Genus: Brochymena
- Species: B. chelonoides

Binomial name
- Brochymena chelonoides Ruckes, 1957

= Brochymena chelonoides =

Species of true bug

Brochymena chelonoides is a species of stink bug in the family Pentatomidae. It is found in Central America and North America.
