= Brochymena cariosa =

Scientific classification
- Kingdom: Animalia
- Phylum: Arthropoda
- Clade: Pancrustacea
- Class: Insecta
- Order: Hemiptera
- Suborder: Heteroptera
- Family: Pentatomidae
- Tribe: Halyini
- Genus: Brochymena
- Species: B. cariosa

Binomial name
- Brochymena cariosa Stål, 1872

Species of true bug

Brochymena cariosa is a species of stink bug in the family Pentatomidae. It is found in North America.
