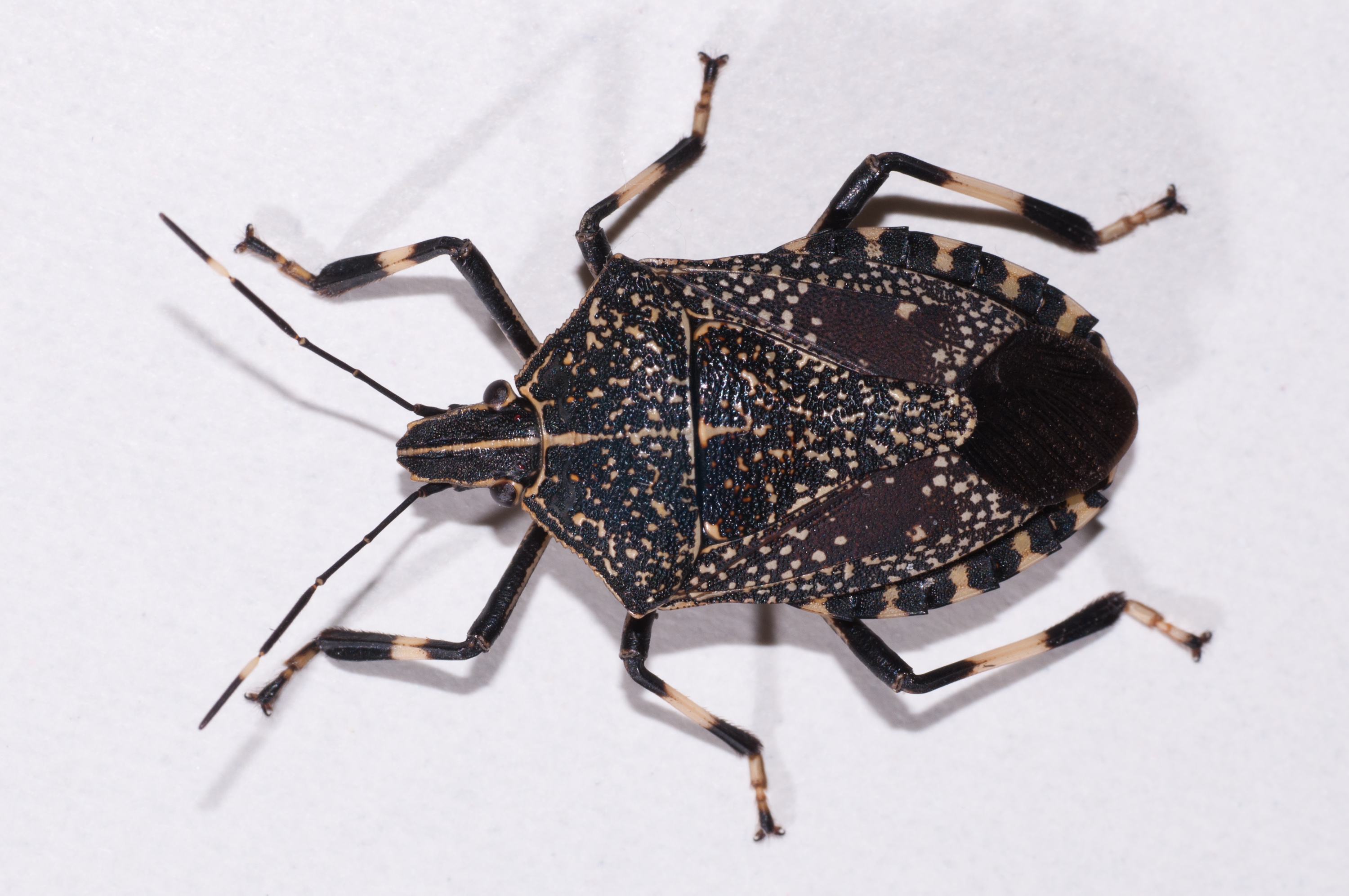
- Erthesina fullo

Scientific classification
- Kingdom: Animalia
- Phylum: Arthropoda
- Clade: Pancrustacea
- Class: Insecta
- Order: Hemiptera
- Suborder: Heteroptera
- Family: Pentatomidae
- Subfamily: Pentatominae
- Tribe: Halyini
- Genus: Erthesina
- Species: E. fullo

Binomial name
- Erthesina fullo (Thunberg, 1783)

= Erthesina fullo =

Species of true bug

Erthesina fullo, commonly known as the yellow-spotted stink bug or yellow marmorated stink bug, is a species of stink bug in the family Pentatomidae. It is found in east and southeast Asia. It is one of the most widely distributed phytophagous insect pests in Asia, and feeds on dozens of host plants including a number of economically important fruits, such as apples, cherries, pears and kiwifruit.

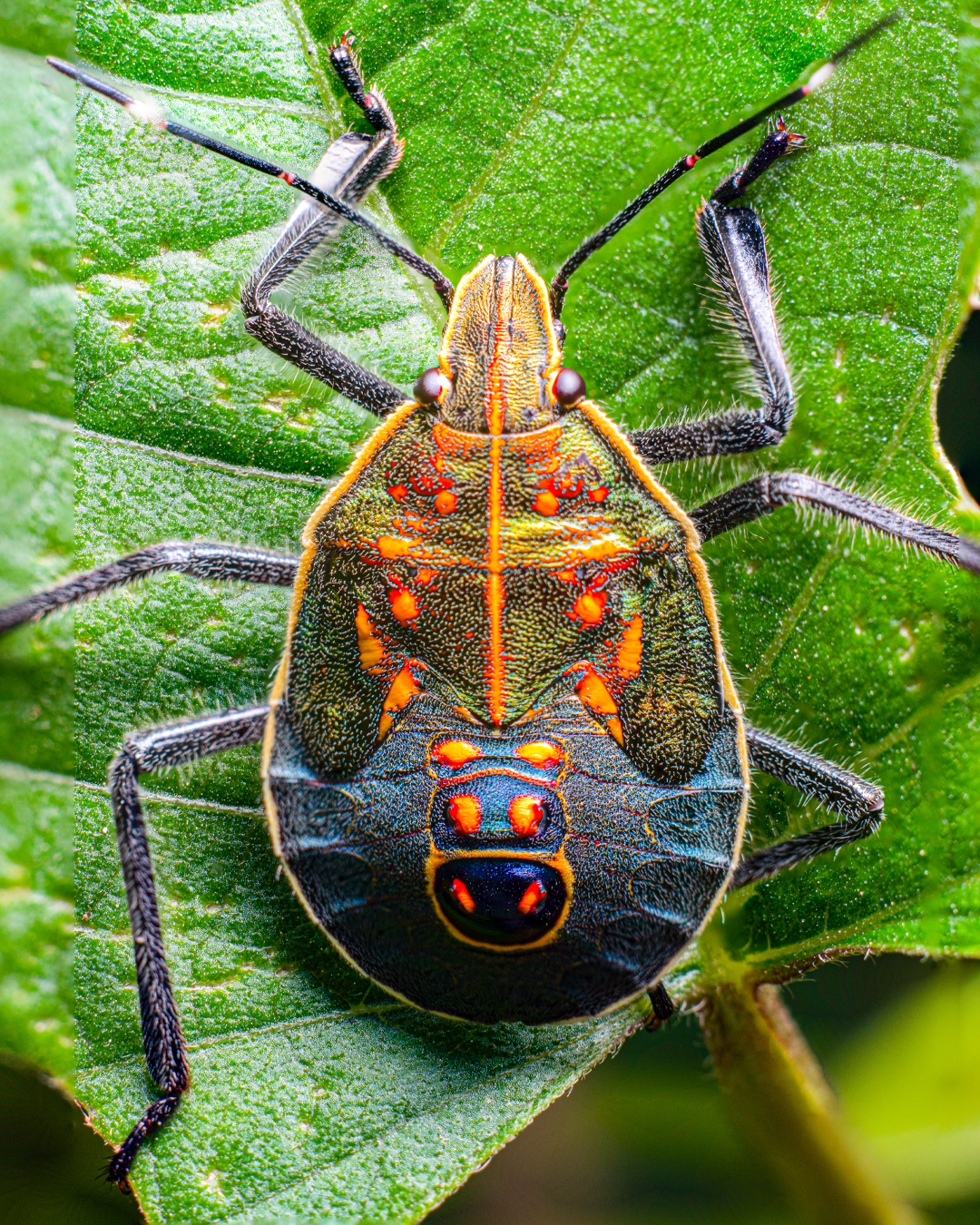
Nymph in Mumbai

Erthesina fullo mating

The native distribution of E. fullo in Asia includes most parts of China, Japan, and south-eastern countries like Myanmar or Vietnam. In addition, it has been reported from parts of India, Bangladesh, Indonesia and the Philippines. Further, it is invasive and has spread to Europe (Albania) and South America (Brazil). Studying the habitat suitability of this species, showed that large parts of North- and South America, Africa, southern Europe and Australia are highly suitable for E. fullo and are at risk of being also invaded.
