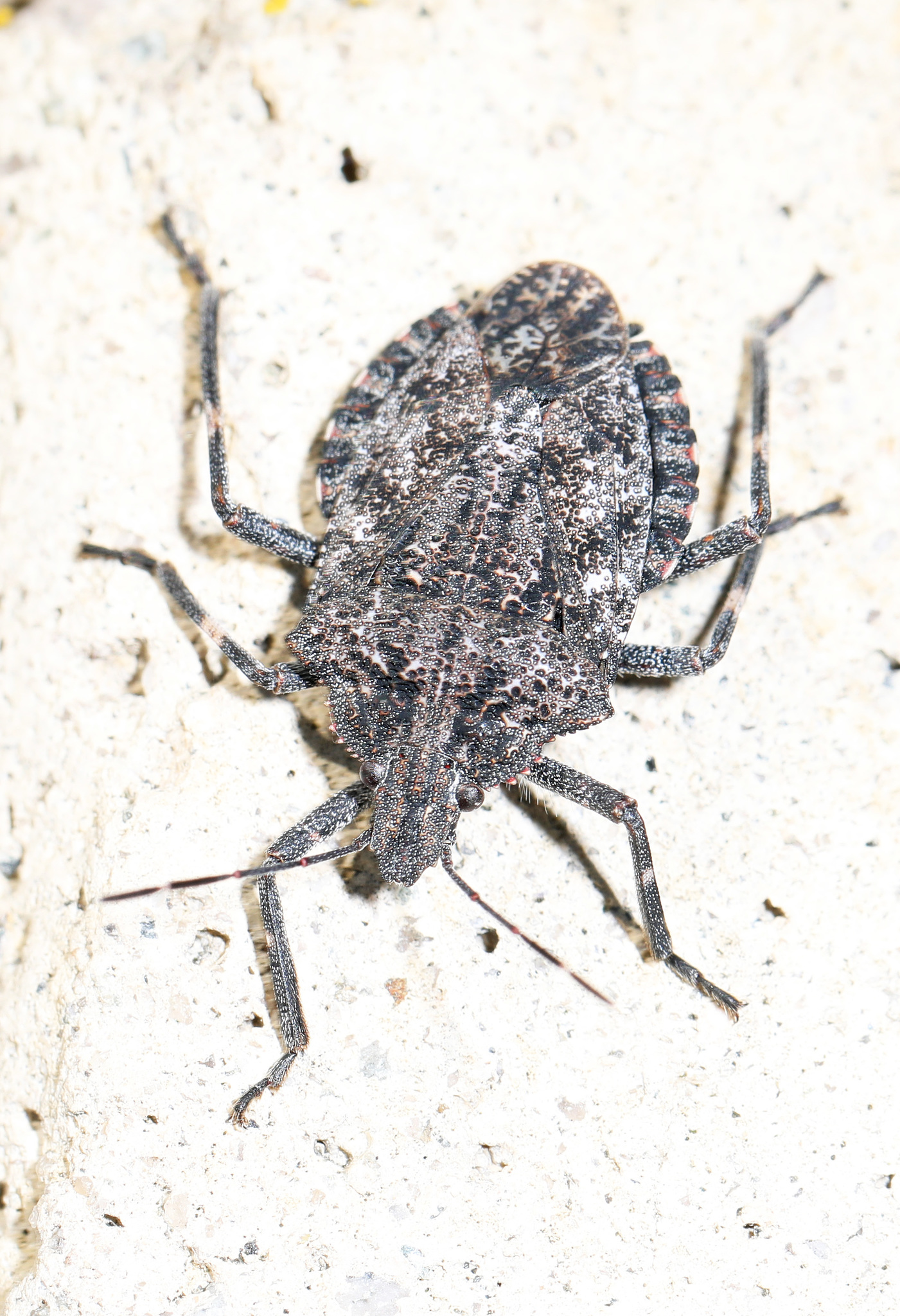

Scientific classification
- Domain: Eukaryota
- Kingdom: Animalia
- Phylum: Arthropoda
- Class: Insecta
- Order: Hemiptera
- Suborder: Heteroptera
- Family: Pentatomidae
- Tribe: Halyini
- Genus: Brochymena
- Species: B. affinis

Binomial name
- Brochymena affinis Van Duzee, 1904

= Brochymena affinis =

Species of true bug

Brochymena affinis is a species of stink bug in the family Pentatomidae. It is found in North America.
