= Brochymena barberi =

Scientific classification
- Domain: Eukaryota
- Kingdom: Animalia
- Phylum: Arthropoda
- Class: Insecta
- Order: Hemiptera
- Suborder: Heteroptera
- Family: Pentatomidae
- Tribe: Halyini
- Genus: Brochymena
- Species: B. barberi

Binomial name
- Brochymena barberi Ruckes, 1939

Species of true bug

Brochymena barberi is a species of stink bug in the family Pentatomidae. It is found in North America.

== Subspecies ==
These two subspecies belong to the species Brochymena barberi:

- Brochymena barberi barberi Ruckes, 1939
- Brochymena barberi diluta Ruckes, 1939
