= Brochymena punctata =

Scientific classification
- Domain: Eukaryota
- Kingdom: Animalia
- Phylum: Arthropoda
- Class: Insecta
- Order: Hemiptera
- Suborder: Heteroptera
- Family: Pentatomidae
- Tribe: Halyini
- Genus: Brochymena
- Species: B. punctata

Binomial name
- Brochymena punctata Van Duzee, 1909

Species of true bug

Brochymena punctata is a species of stink bug in the family Pentatomidae. It is found in North America.

== Subspecies ==
These two subspecies belong to the species Brochymena punctata:

- Brochymena punctata pallida Blatchley, 1926
- Brochymena punctata punctata Van Duzee, 1909
