= Halys =

Halys may refer to:

- Health-adjusted life years (HALYs), a type of disability-adjusted life year which are used in attempts to quantify the burden of disease or disability in populations
- Halys River, a western name for the Kızılırmak River (Turkish: "Red River") in Anatolia
- Halys (bug), a genus of stink bugs
- A taxonomic synonym for the genus Gloydius, also known as Asian moccasin snakes, a group of venomous pitvipers found in Asia
  - Gloydius halys, also known by the names Halys viper and Halys pit viper
- Quentin Halys (born 1996), French tennis player

== See also ==
- Battle of Halys, 82 BC
- Battle of the Eclipse (also Battle of Halys) between the Medes and the Lydians in the early 6th century BC
- Halley's Bible Handbook by Dr. Henry Hampton Halley (1824-1965), a.k.a. 'Halley's'
