= Brochymena parva =

Scientific classification
- Domain: Eukaryota
- Kingdom: Animalia
- Phylum: Arthropoda
- Class: Insecta
- Order: Hemiptera
- Suborder: Heteroptera
- Family: Pentatomidae
- Tribe: Halyini
- Genus: Brochymena
- Species: B. parva

Binomial name
- Brochymena parva Ruckes, 1946

Species of true bug

Brochymena parva is a species of stink bug in the family Pentatomidae. It is found in Central America and North America.
