= Brochymena lineata =

Scientific classification
- Domain: Eukaryota
- Kingdom: Animalia
- Phylum: Arthropoda
- Class: Insecta
- Order: Hemiptera
- Suborder: Heteroptera
- Family: Pentatomidae
- Tribe: Halyini
- Genus: Brochymena
- Species: B. lineata

Binomial name
- Brochymena lineata Ruckes, 1939

Species of true bug

Brochymena lineata is a species of stink bug in the family Pentatomidae. It is found in North America.
