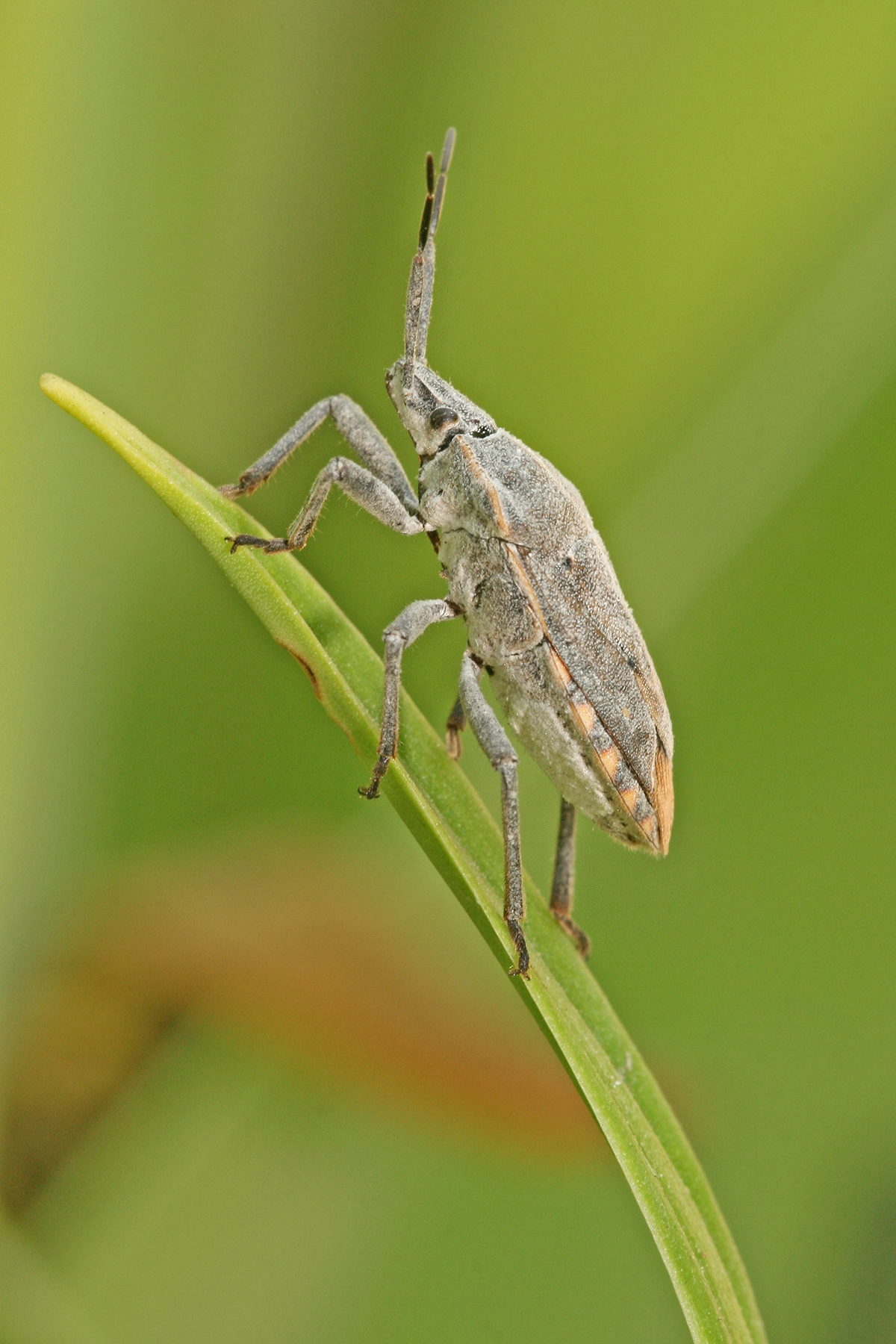
- Pseudatelus adult

Scientific classification
- Kingdom: Animalia
- Phylum: Arthropoda
- Clade: Pancrustacea
- Class: Insecta
- Order: Hemiptera
- Suborder: Heteroptera
- Family: Pentatomidae
- Subfamily: Pentatominae
- Tribe: Halyini
- Genus: Pseudatelus; Linnavuori, 1982

Type species
- Pentatoma spinulosa Palisot de Beauvois, 1807

= Pseudatelus =

Genus of true bugs

Pseudatelus is a genus of shield bugs of the family Pentatomidae. Currently placed in the tribe Halyini, McPherson's overview of the Pentatomoidea suggested it may be better placed into the Memmiini.

== Description ==
Pseudatelus bugs range from 14 to 20 millimetres (0.55 to 0.79 in) depending on the species. The bugs have a typical shield shape body. They are usually from brown to dark brown in colour, with triangular-shaped scutellum.

On female Pseudatelus bugs, the abdominal venter is almost entirely covered by a large, hair-covered opaque area. The long hairs on these areas may accumulate a waxy secretion.

== Species ==
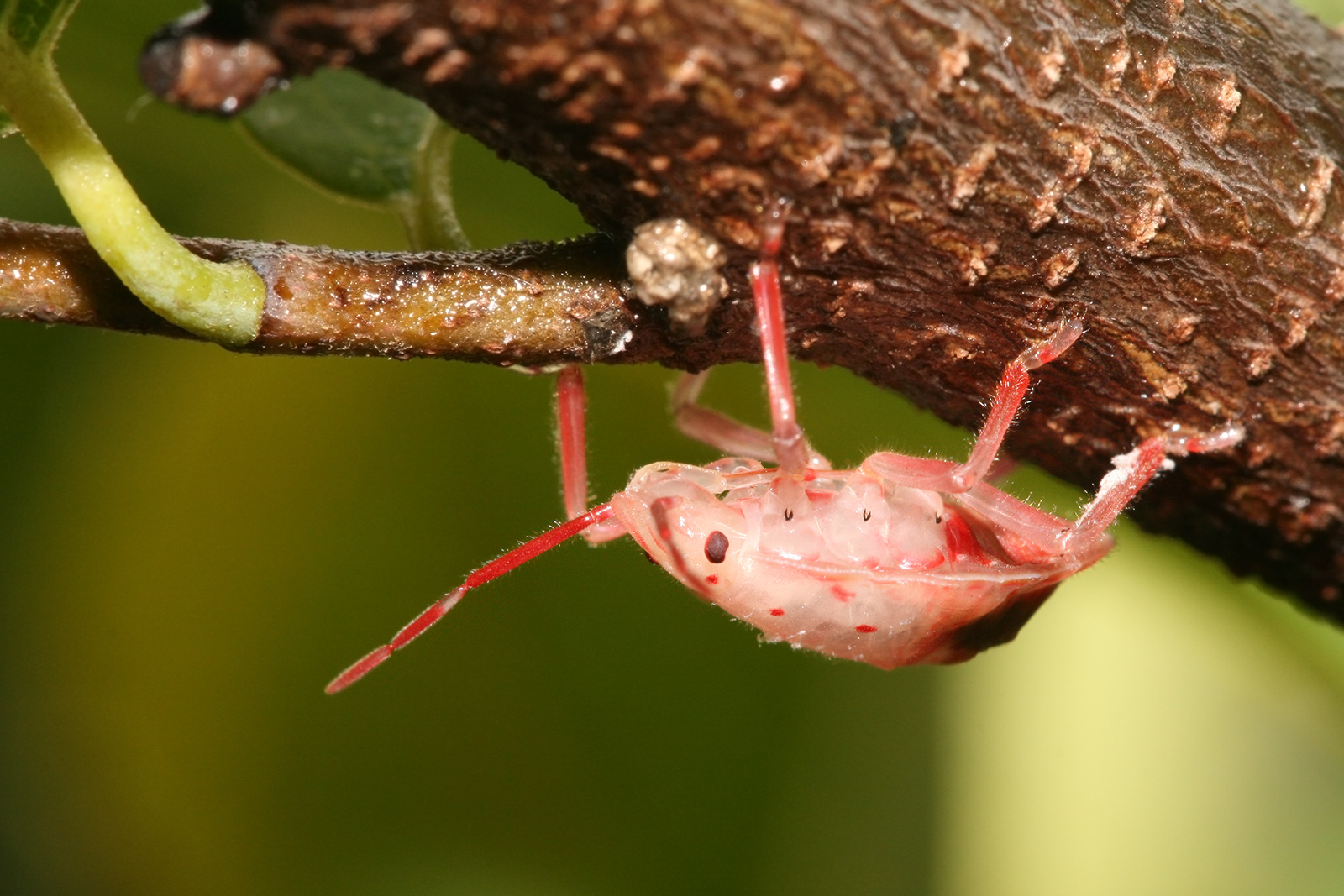
Pseudatelus nymph

The genus contains the following species:

- Pseudatelus latus
- Pseudatelus limatus
- Pseudatelus obscurus
- Pseudatelus spinulosus (Palisot de Beauvois, 1807)
- Pseudatelus sticticus
