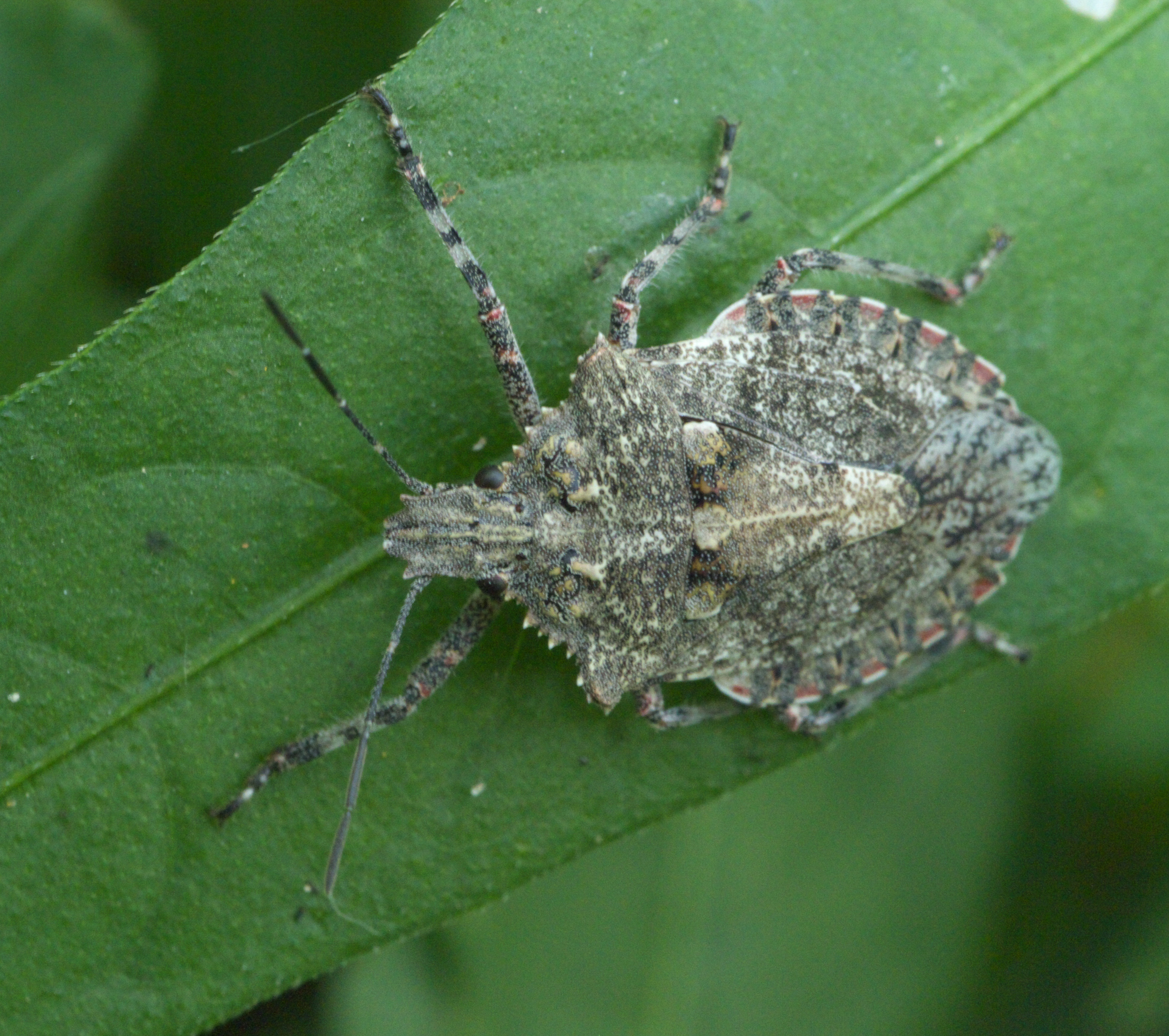
- Brochymena arborea

Scientific classification
- Kingdom: Animalia
- Phylum: Arthropoda
- Clade: Pancrustacea
- Class: Insecta
- Order: Hemiptera
- Suborder: Heteroptera
- Family: Pentatomidae
- Tribe: Halyini
- Genus: Brochymena; Amyot & Serville, 1843

Synonyms
- Parabrochymena

= Brochymena =

Genus of true bugs

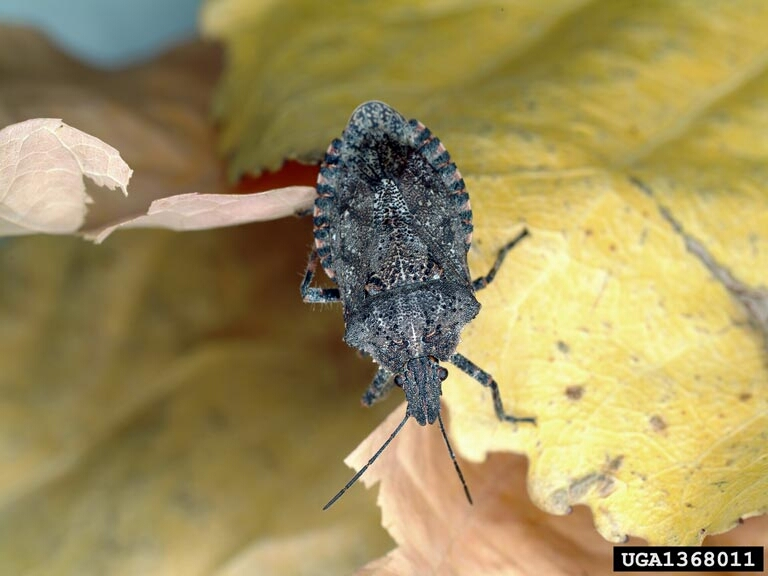

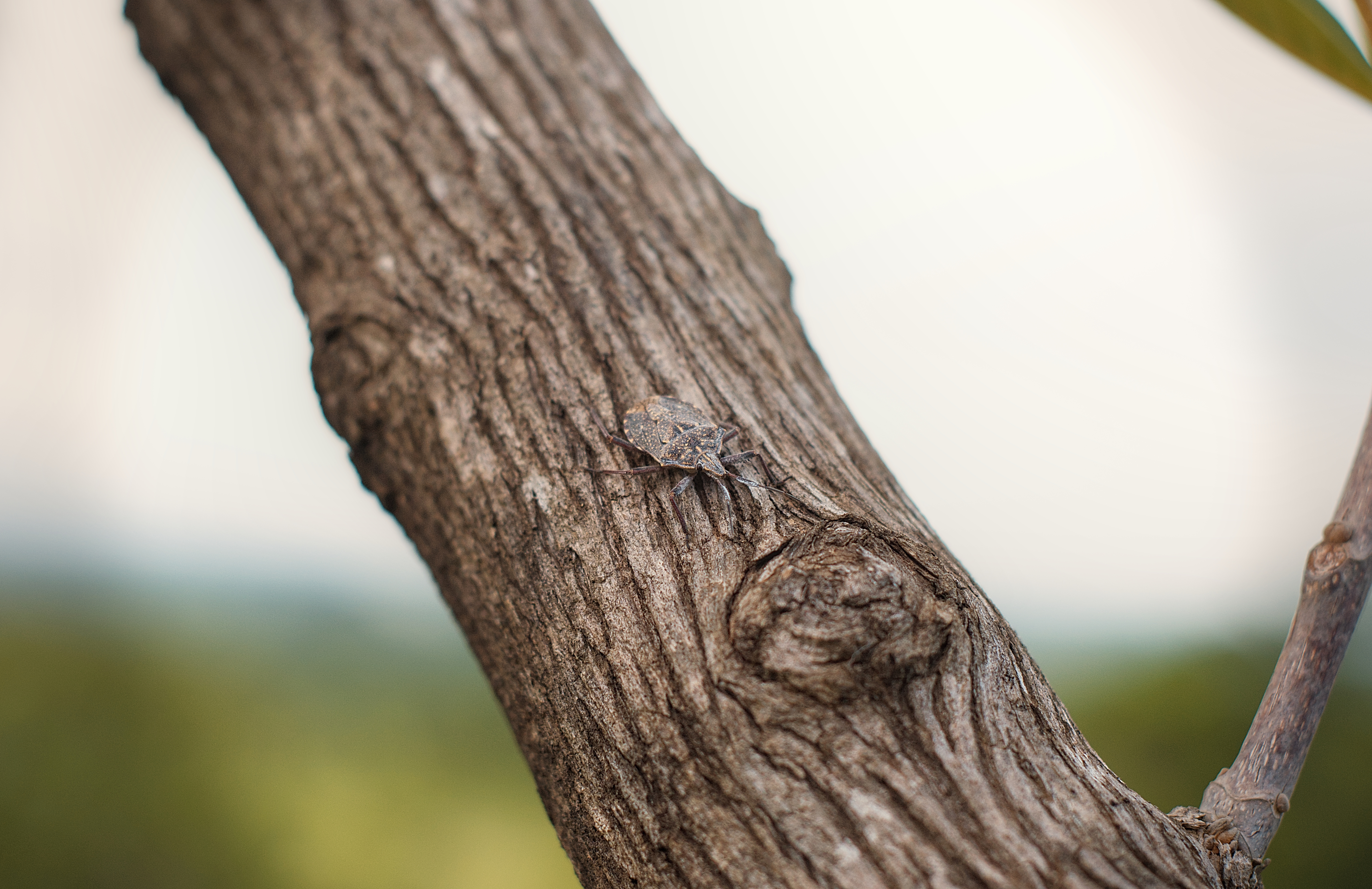
Brochymena in its natural habitat

Brochymena is a genus of North American shield bugs, sometimes known as the rough stink bugs. They belong to the tribe Halyini, and may be confused with the similar-looking brown marmorated stink bug (tribe Cappaeini).

== Species ==
- Brochymena affinis Van Duzee, 1904
- Brochymena apiculata Van Duzee, 1923
- Brochymena arborea (Say, 1825)
- Brochymena barberi Ruckes, 1939
- Brochymena cariosa Stål, 1872
- Brochymena carolinensis (Westwood, 1837)
- Brochymena chelonoides Ruckes, 1957
- Brochymena dilata Ruckes, 1939
- Brochymena exardentia Ruckes, 1961
- Brochymena florida Ruckes, 1939
- Brochymena haedula Stål, 1862
- Brochymena hoppingi Van Duzee, 1921
- Brochymena laevigata Ruckes, 1957
- Brochymena lineata Ruckes, 1939
- Brochymena marginella Stål, 1872
- Brochymena myops Stål, 1872
- Brochymena parva Ruckes, 1946
- Brochymena pilatei Van Duzee, 1934
- Brochymena poeyi (Guérin-Méneville, 1857)
- Brochymena punctata Van Duzee, 1909
- Brochymena quadripustulata (Fabricius, 1775) (four-humped stink bug)
- Brochymena sulcata Van Duzee, 1918
