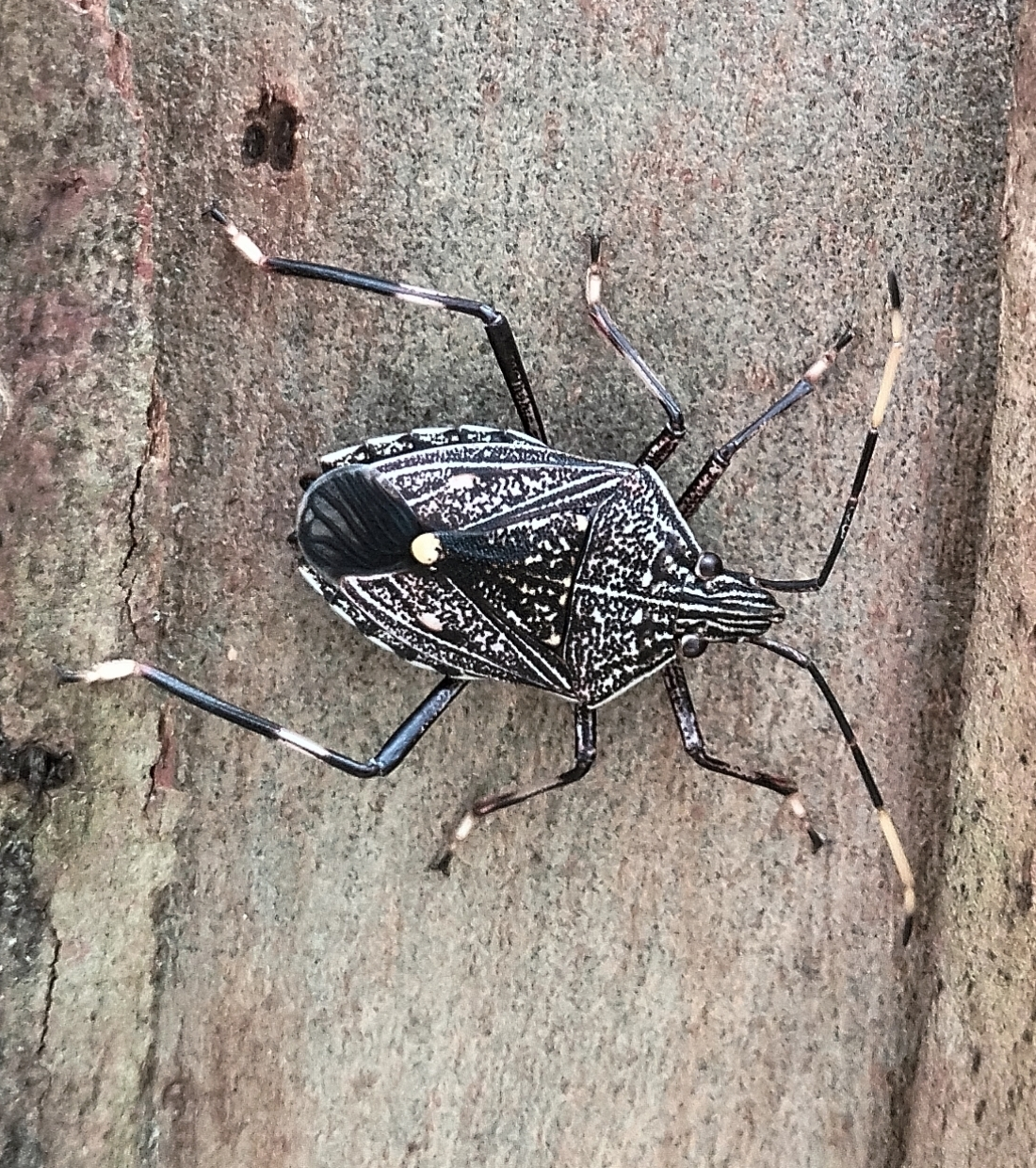
- Theseus modestus, Australia

Scientific classification
- Kingdom: Animalia
- Phylum: Arthropoda
- Clade: Pancrustacea
- Class: Insecta
- Order: Hemiptera
- Suborder: Heteroptera
- Family: Pentatomidae
- Genus: Theseus
- Species: T. modestus

Binomial name
- Theseus modestus (Stål, 1865)

= Theseus modestus =

Species of true bugs

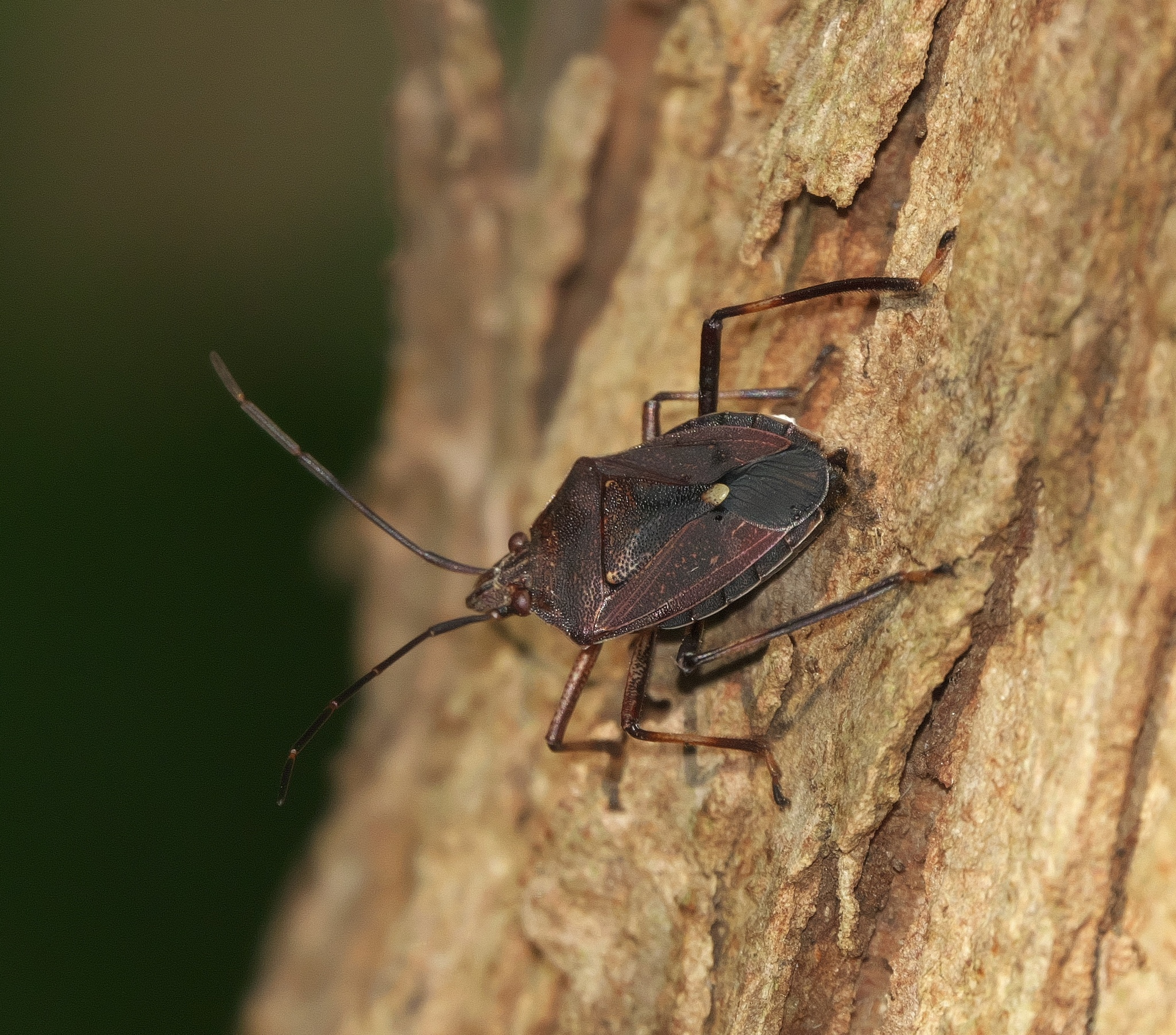
Theseus modestus scutellatus, Australia

Theseus modestus is a species of stink bug in the family Pentatomidae, found in Australia.

== Subspecies ==
Theseus modestus has four subspecies:

- Theseus modestus modestus (Stål, 1865)
- Theseus modestus occidentalis Baehr, 1991
- Theseus modestus scutellatus (Distant, 1899)
- Theseus modestus tasmanicus Baehr, 1989
