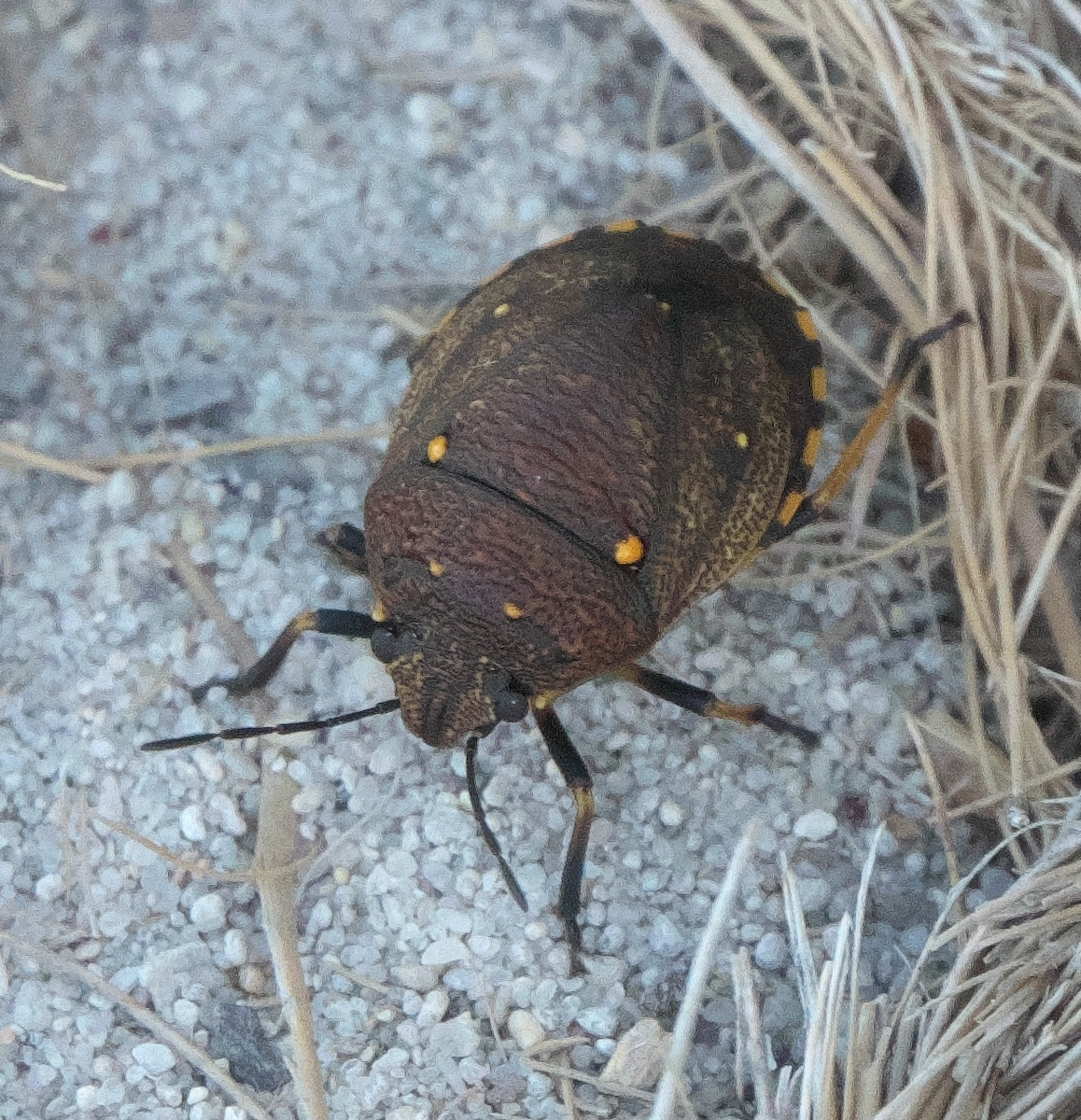
- Platycoris, Australia

Scientific classification
- Kingdom: Animalia
- Phylum: Arthropoda
- Clade: Pancrustacea
- Class: Insecta
- Order: Hemiptera
- Suborder: Heteroptera
- Family: Pentatomidae
- Subfamily: Pentatominae
- Tribe: Halyini
- Genus: Platycoris; Guérin, 1831

= Platycoris =

Genus of true bugs

Platycoris is a genus of stink bugs in the family Pentatomidae. There are at least eight described species in Platycoris, found in Australia.

== Species ==
These eight species belong to the genus Platycoris:

- Platycoris bipunctatus Guérin, 1831
- Platycoris brunneus (McDonald, 1995)
- Platycoris fulvolateris (McDonald, 1995)
- Platycoris minimus (McDonald, 1995)
- Platycoris musgravei (McDonald, 1995)
- Platycoris palmeri (McDonald, 1995)
- Platycoris rotundatus (Dallas, 1851)
- Platycoris rugosus (Spinola, 1850)
