= Omyta delineata =

Scientific classification
- Kingdom: Animalia
- Phylum: Arthropoda
- Clade: Pancrustacea
- Class: Insecta
- Order: Hemiptera
- Suborder: Heteroptera
- Family: Pentatomidae
- Genus: Omyta
- Species: O. delineata

Binomial name
- Omyta delineata Stål, 1865

Species of shield bug

Omyta delineata is a species of insect belonging to the family Pentatomidae, the shield bugs. It is found only in southwestern Australia.
