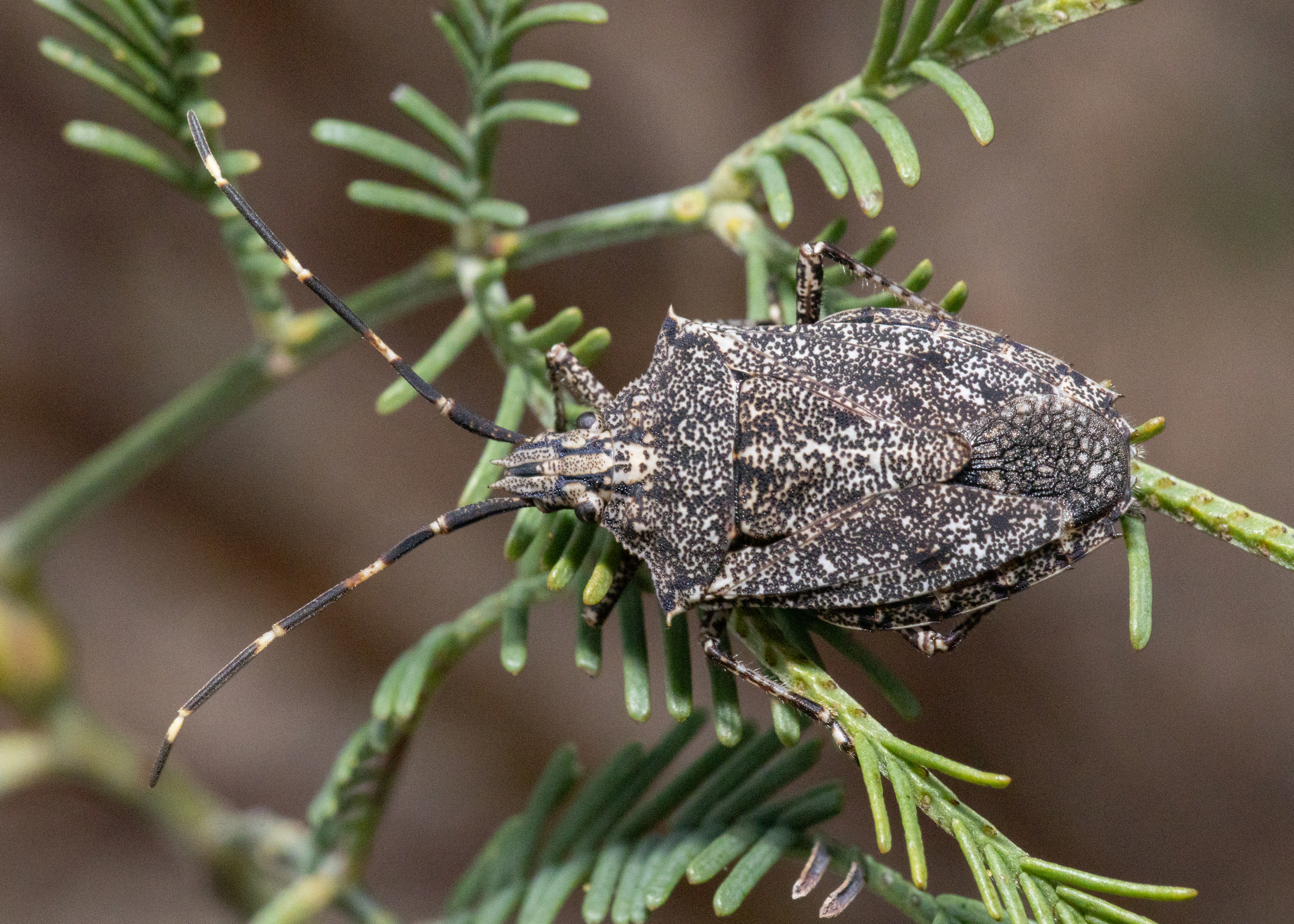
- Alcaeus varicornis, Australia

Scientific classification
- Kingdom: Animalia
- Phylum: Arthropoda
- Clade: Pancrustacea
- Class: Insecta
- Order: Hemiptera
- Suborder: Heteroptera
- Family: Pentatomidae
- Subfamily: Pentatominae
- Tribe: Halyini
- Genus: Alcaeus; Dallas, 1851

Synonyms
- Muritha Distant, 1910

= Alcaeus (bug) =

Genus of true bugs

Alcaeus is a genus of stink bugs in the family Pentatomidae. There are at least four described species in Alcaeus, found in Australia.

== Species ==
These three species belong to the genus Alcaeus:

- Alcaeus hermannsburgi (Distant, 1910)
- Alcaeus lignicolor Walker, 1867
- Alcaeus subspinosus Gross, 1976
- Alcaeus varicornis (Westwood, 1837)
