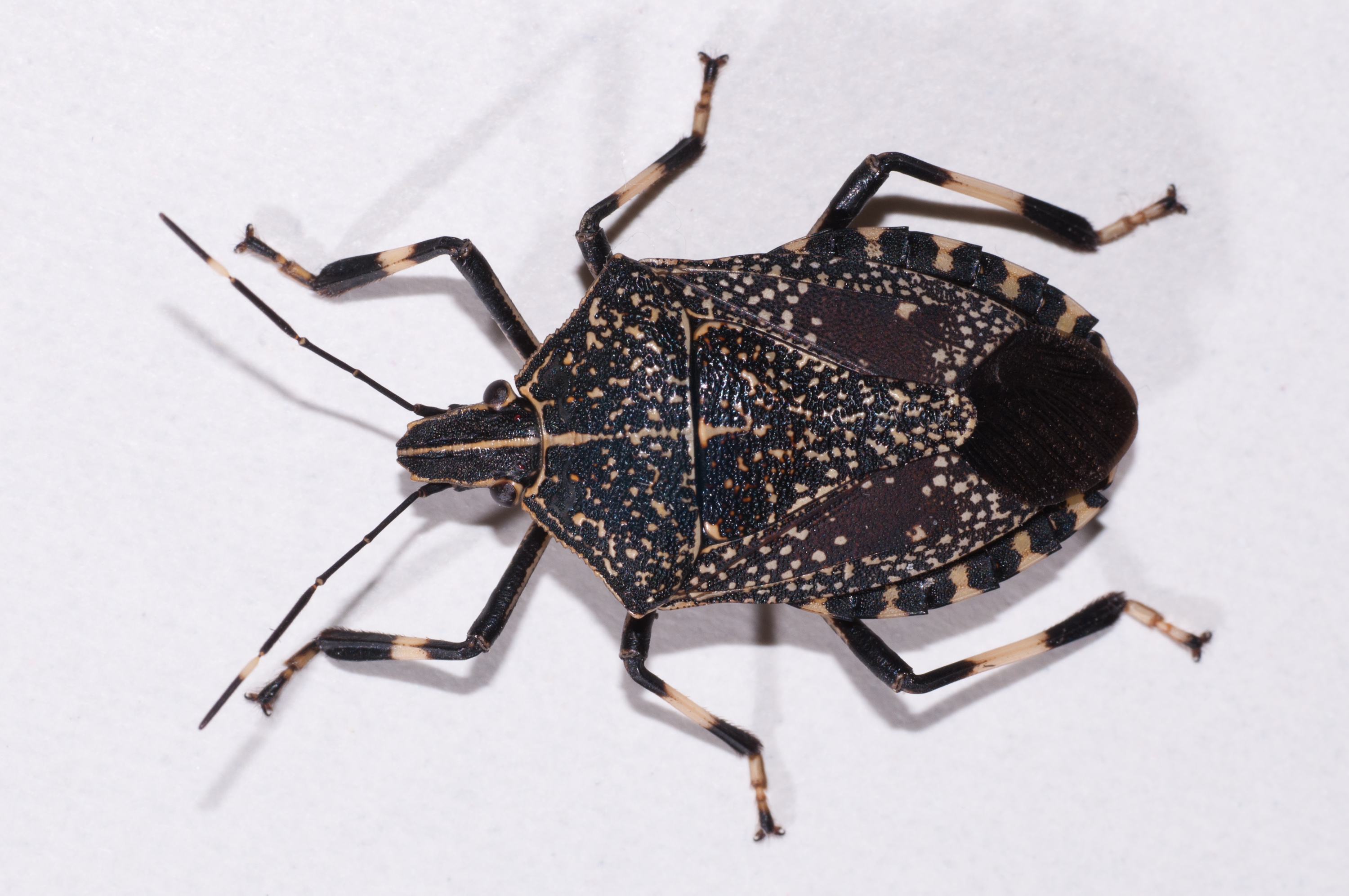
- Erthesina fullo

Scientific classification
- Kingdom: Animalia
- Phylum: Arthropoda
- Clade: Pancrustacea
- Class: Insecta
- Order: Hemiptera
- Suborder: Heteroptera
- Family: Pentatomidae
- Subfamily: Pentatominae
- Tribe: Halyini
- Genus: Erthesina; Spinola, 1837

= Erthesina =

Genus of true bugs

Erthesina is a genus of Asian shield bugs in the tribe Halyini. There are at least two described species in Erthesina.

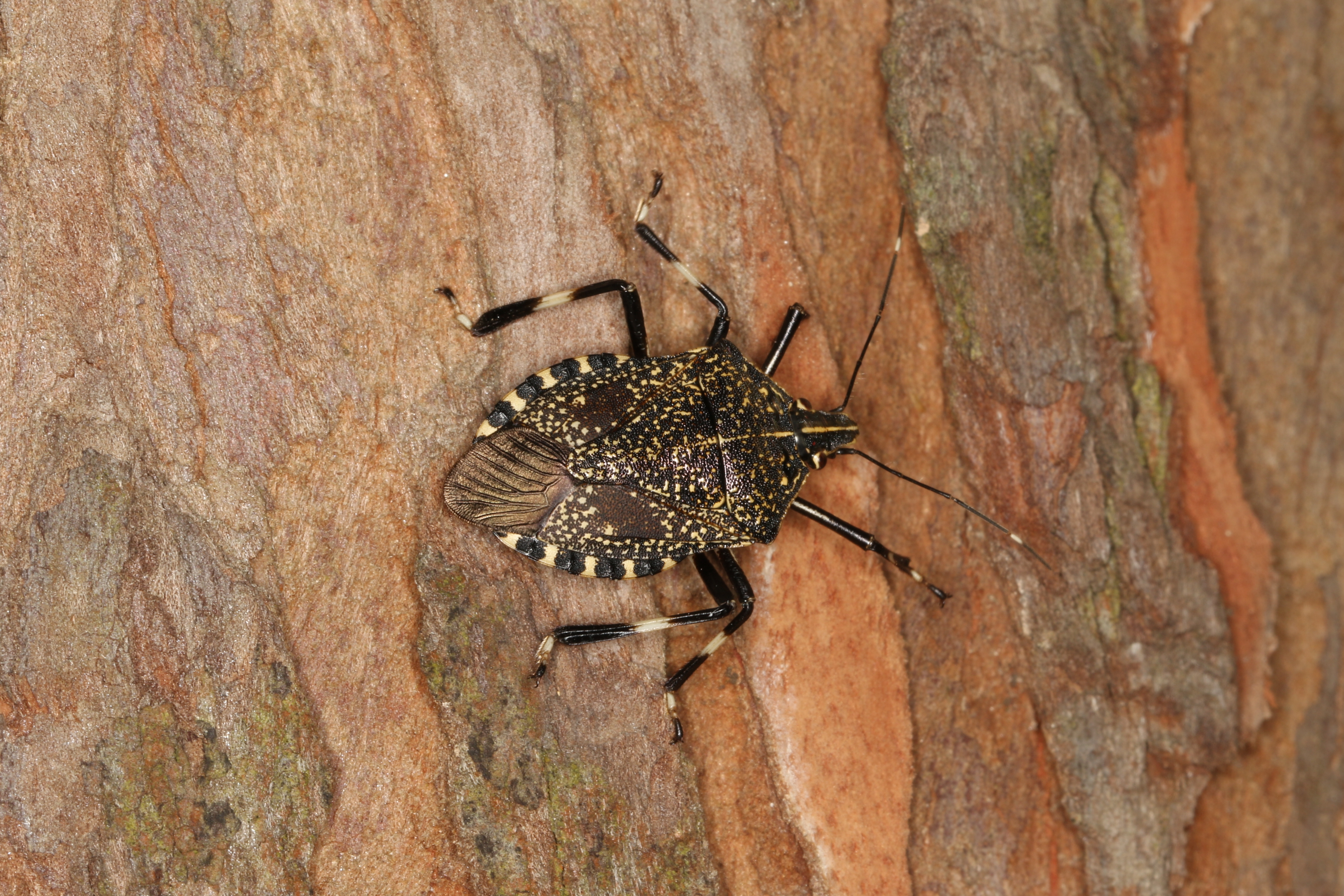
Erthesina fullo

== Species ==
These two species belong to the genus Erthesina:

- Erthesina acuminata
- Erthesina fullo (Thunberg, 1783)
