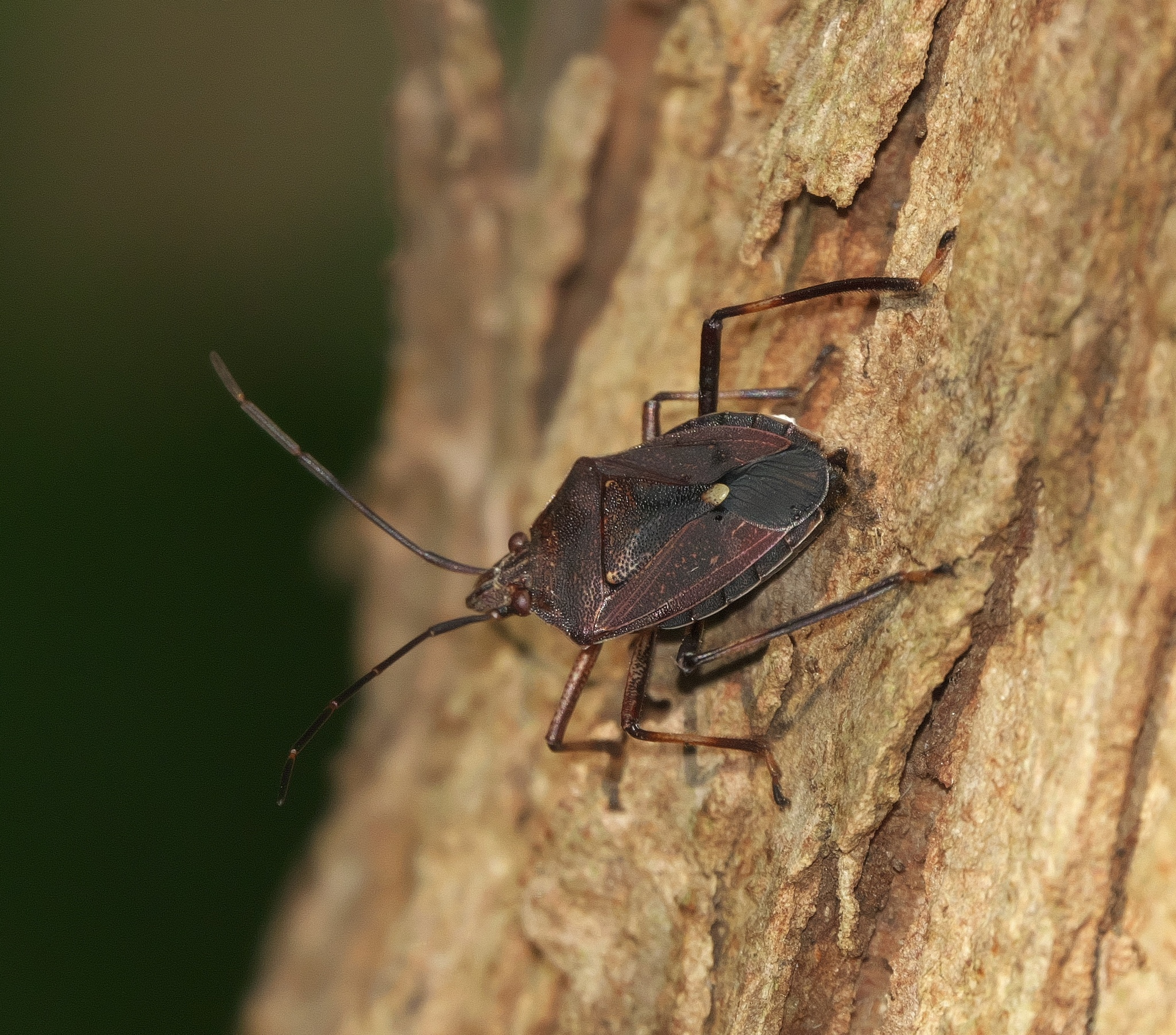
- Theseus modestus scutellatus, Australia

Scientific classification
- Kingdom: Animalia
- Phylum: Arthropoda
- Class: Insecta
- Order: Hemiptera
- Suborder: Heteroptera
- Family: Pentatomidae
- Subfamily: Pentatominae
- Tribe: Halyini
- Genus: Theseus; Stål, 1867

= Theseus (bug) =

Genus of true bugs

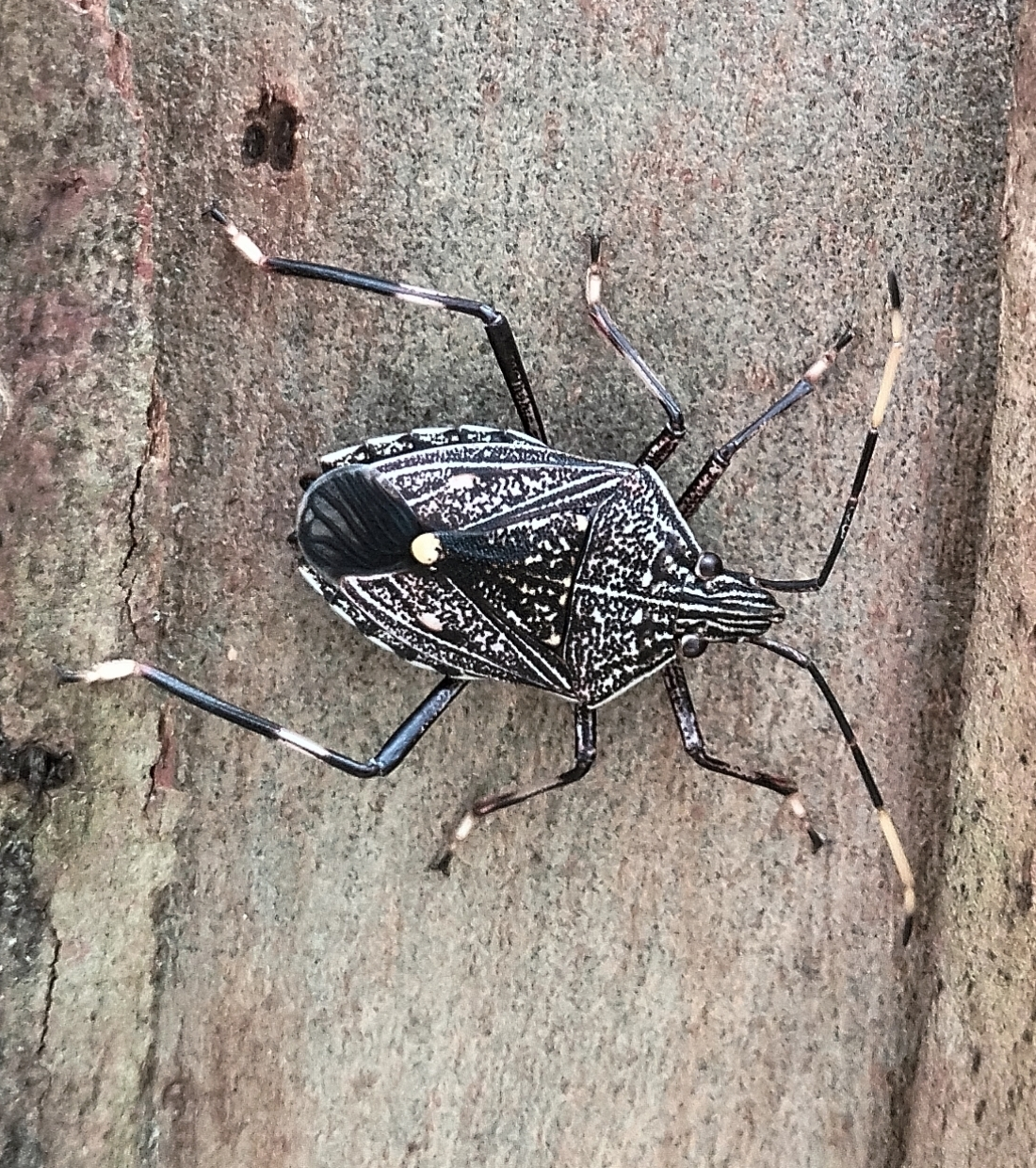
Theseus modestus, Australia

Theseus is a genus of stink bugs in the family Pentatomidae, found in Australia.

== Species ==
These three species belong to the genus Theseus:

- Theseus distanti Gross, 1972
- Theseus grossi McDonald, 1988
- Theseus modestus (Stål, 1865)
