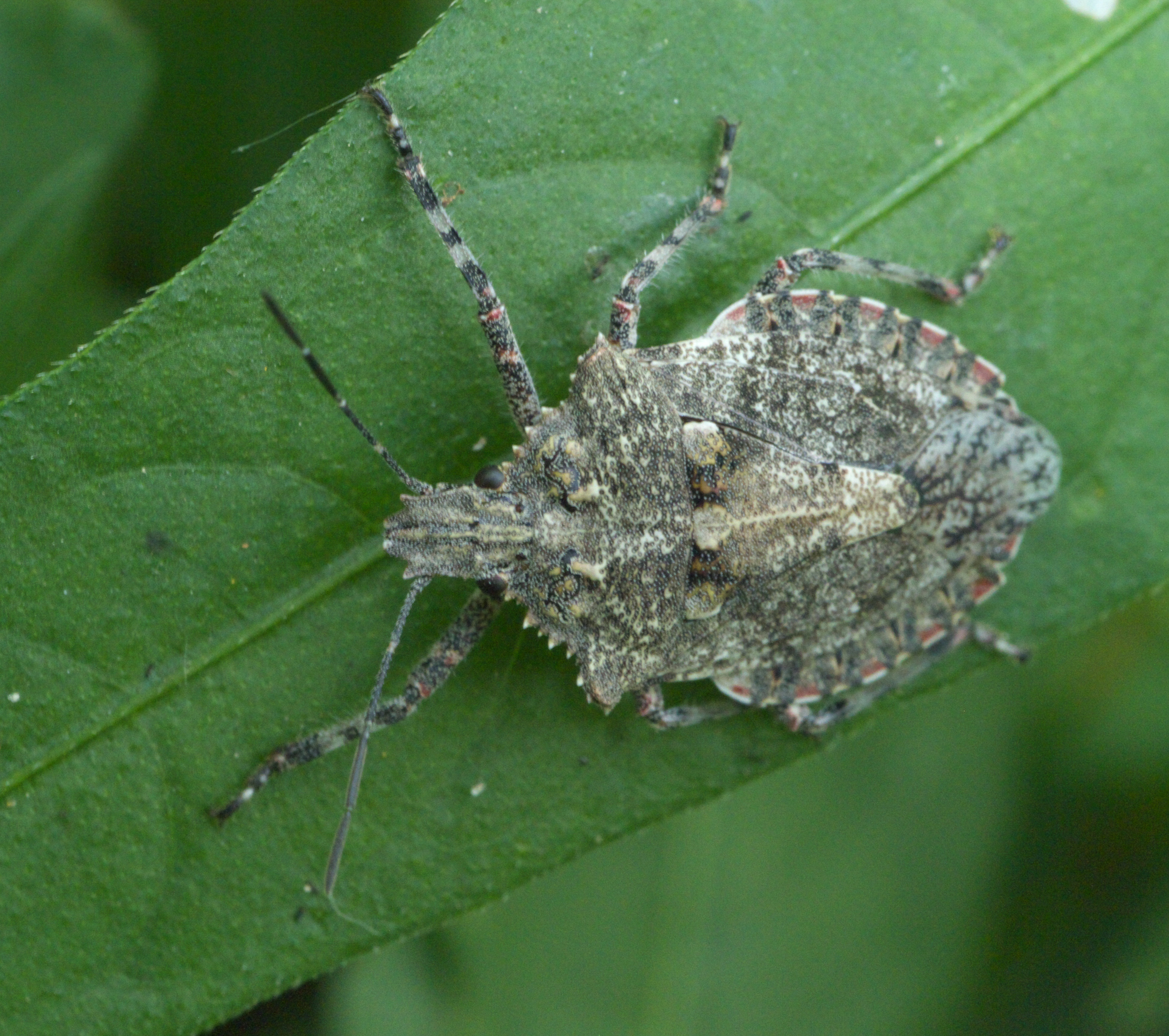

Scientific classification
- Domain: Eukaryota
- Kingdom: Animalia
- Phylum: Arthropoda
- Class: Insecta
- Order: Hemiptera
- Suborder: Heteroptera
- Family: Pentatomidae
- Genus: Brochymena
- Species: B. arborea

Binomial name
- Brochymena arborea (Say, 1825)

= Brochymena arborea =

Species of true bug

Brochymena arborea is a species of stink bug in the family Pentatomidae. It is found in Central America and North America.

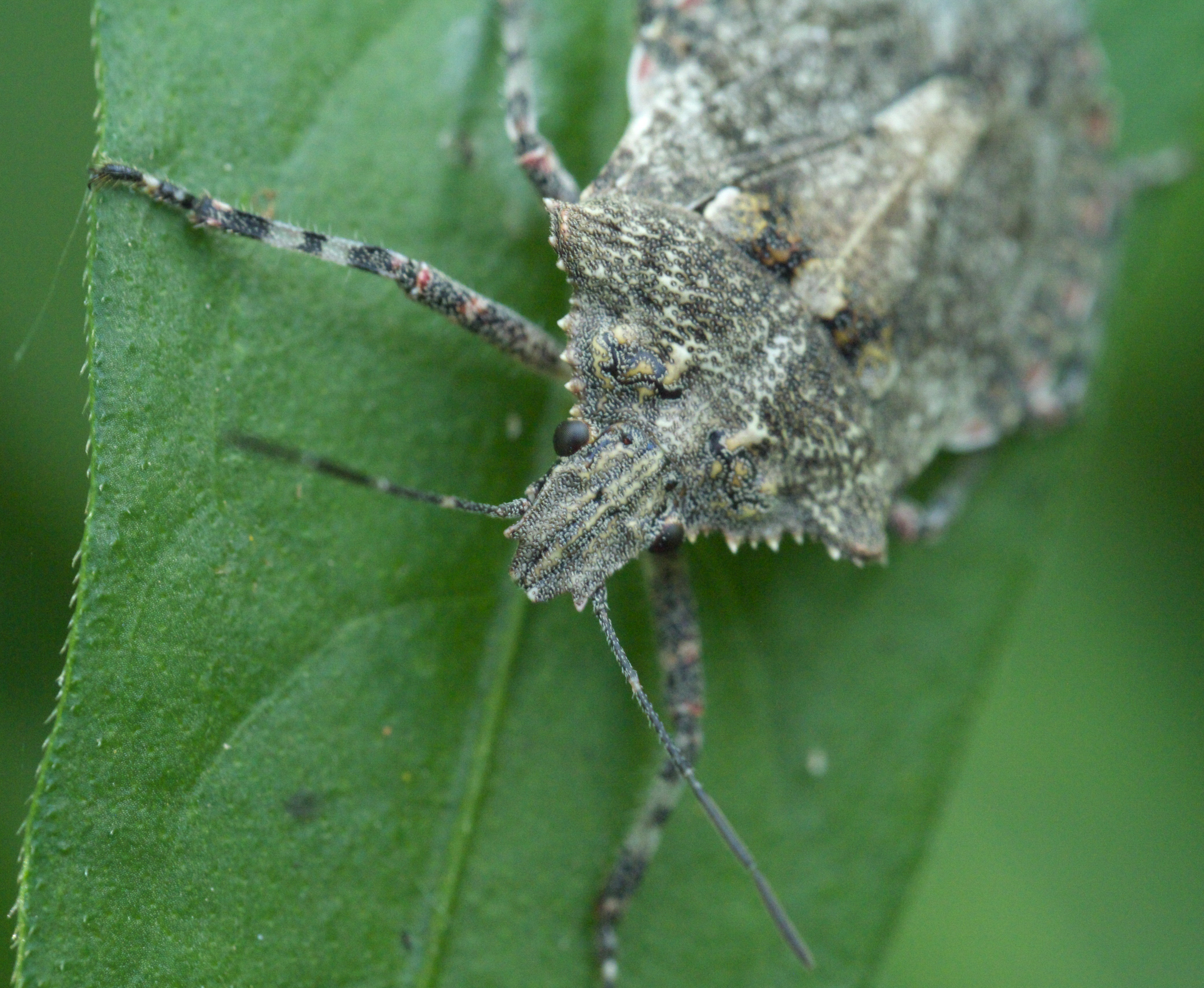
