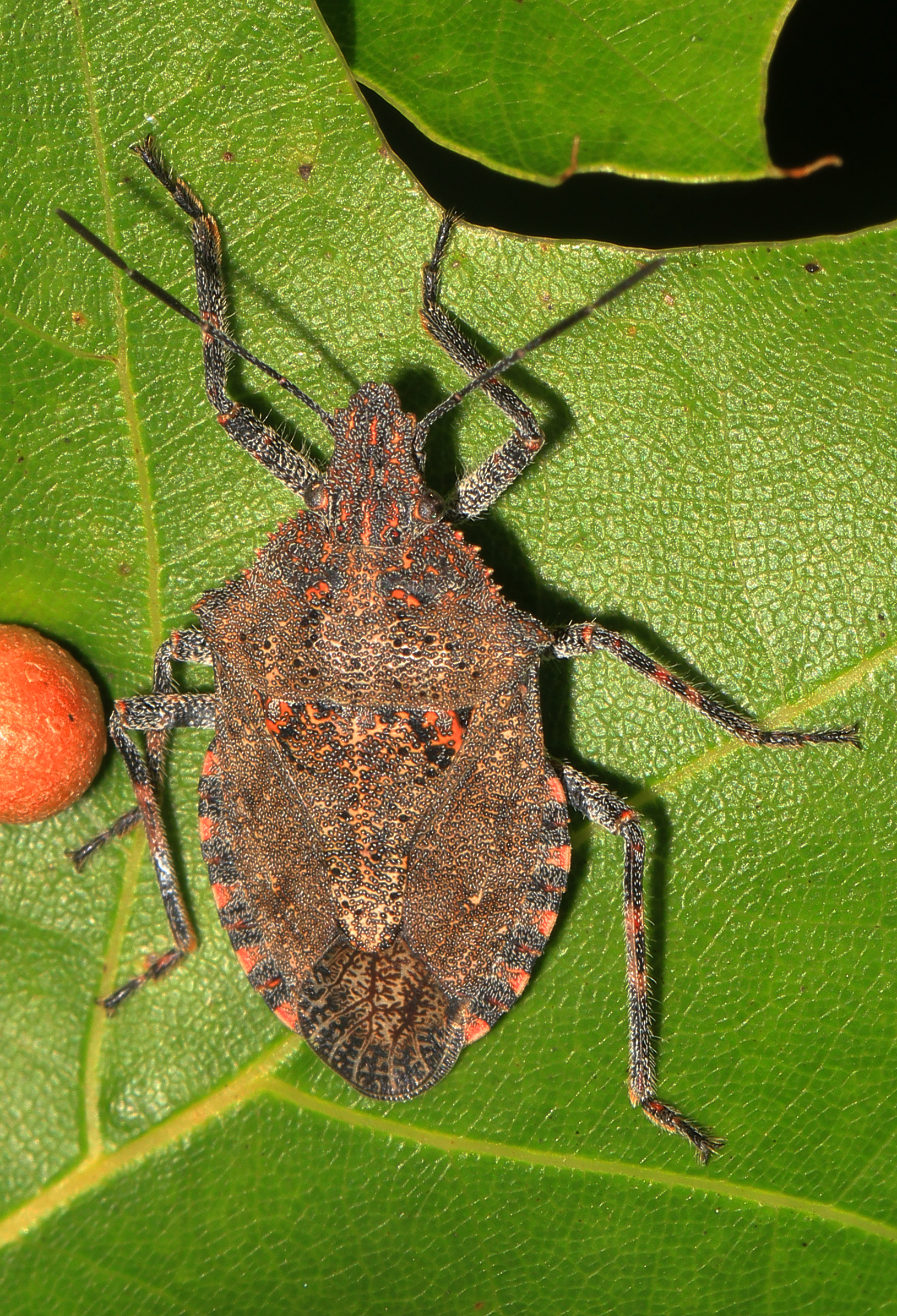

Scientific classification
- Domain: Eukaryota
- Kingdom: Animalia
- Phylum: Arthropoda
- Class: Insecta
- Order: Hemiptera
- Suborder: Heteroptera
- Family: Pentatomidae
- Genus: Brochymena
- Species: B. quadripustulata

Binomial name
- Brochymena quadripustulata (Fabricius, 1775)

Synonyms
- Brochymena serrata (Amyot and Serville, 1843); Halys serrata Amyot and Serville, 1843

= Brochymena quadripustulata =

Species of true bug

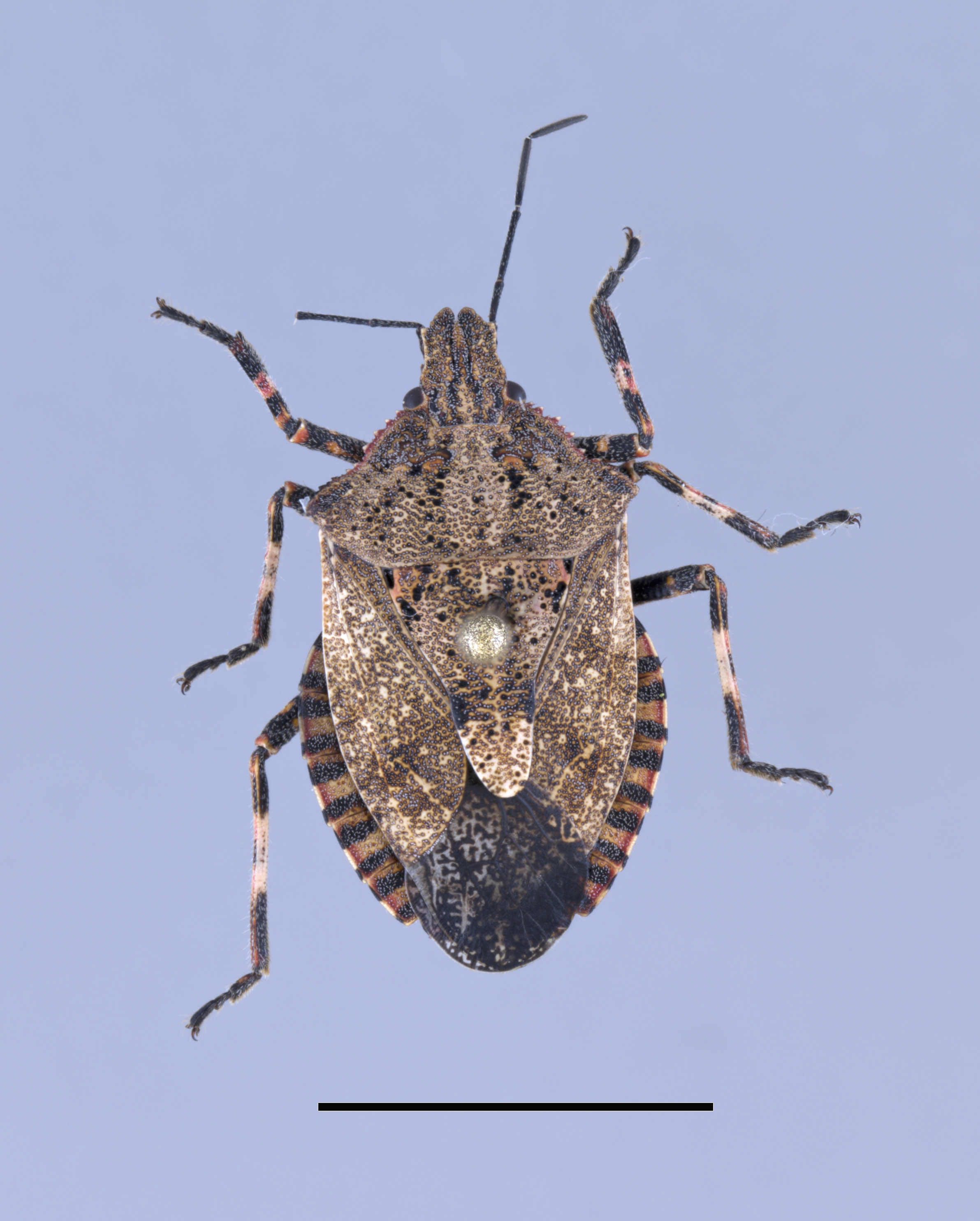
Brochymena quadripustulata (Fabricius, 1775) Order: Hemiptera. Family: Pentatomidae. 1cm scale Collected in GA, Baldwin Co, Lake Laurel forest on 9 November 2024 by Kaitlin Acosta.

Brochymena quadripustulata, known generally as the four-humped stink bug or rough stink bug, is a species of stink bug in the family Pentatomidae. It is found in North America.

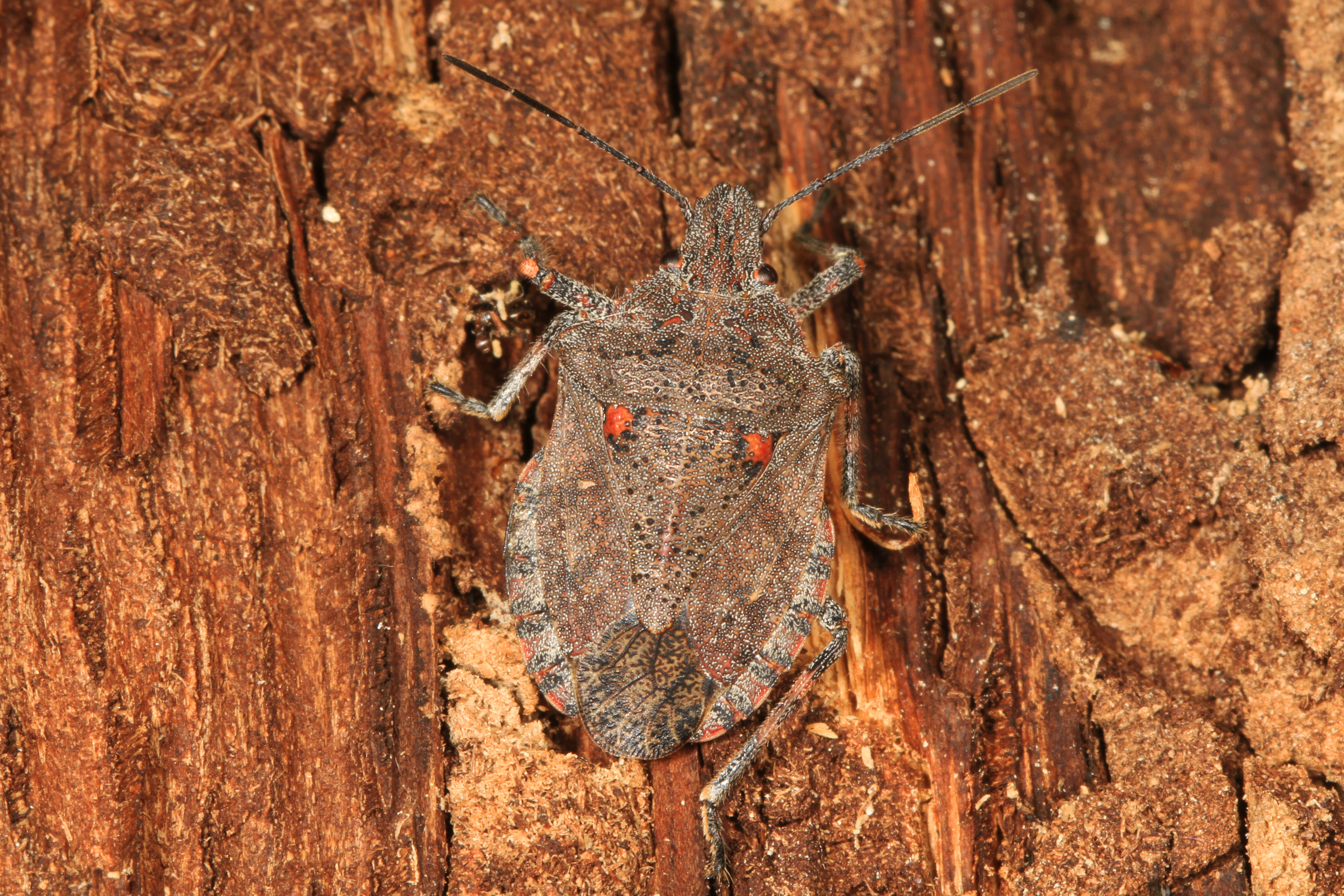
Four-humped stink bug, Brochymena quadripustulata
