= Iskenderia =

Scientific classification
- Kingdom: Animalia
- Phylum: Arthropoda
- Clade: Pancrustacea
- Class: Insecta
- Order: Hemiptera
- Suborder: Heteroptera
- Family: Pentatomidae
- Subfamily: Pentatominae
- Tribe: Halyini
- Genus: Iskenderia; Kiritshenko, 1952
- Species: I. fedtshenkoi

Binomial name
- Iskenderia fedtshenkoi Kiritshenko, 1952

Genus of insects

Iskenderia is a monotypic genus of shield bugs, containing the species Iskenderia fedtshenkoi from Tajikistan. It has been placed in the subfamily Pentatominae and tribe Halyini and was erected by Aleksandr Kiritshenko in 1952.
