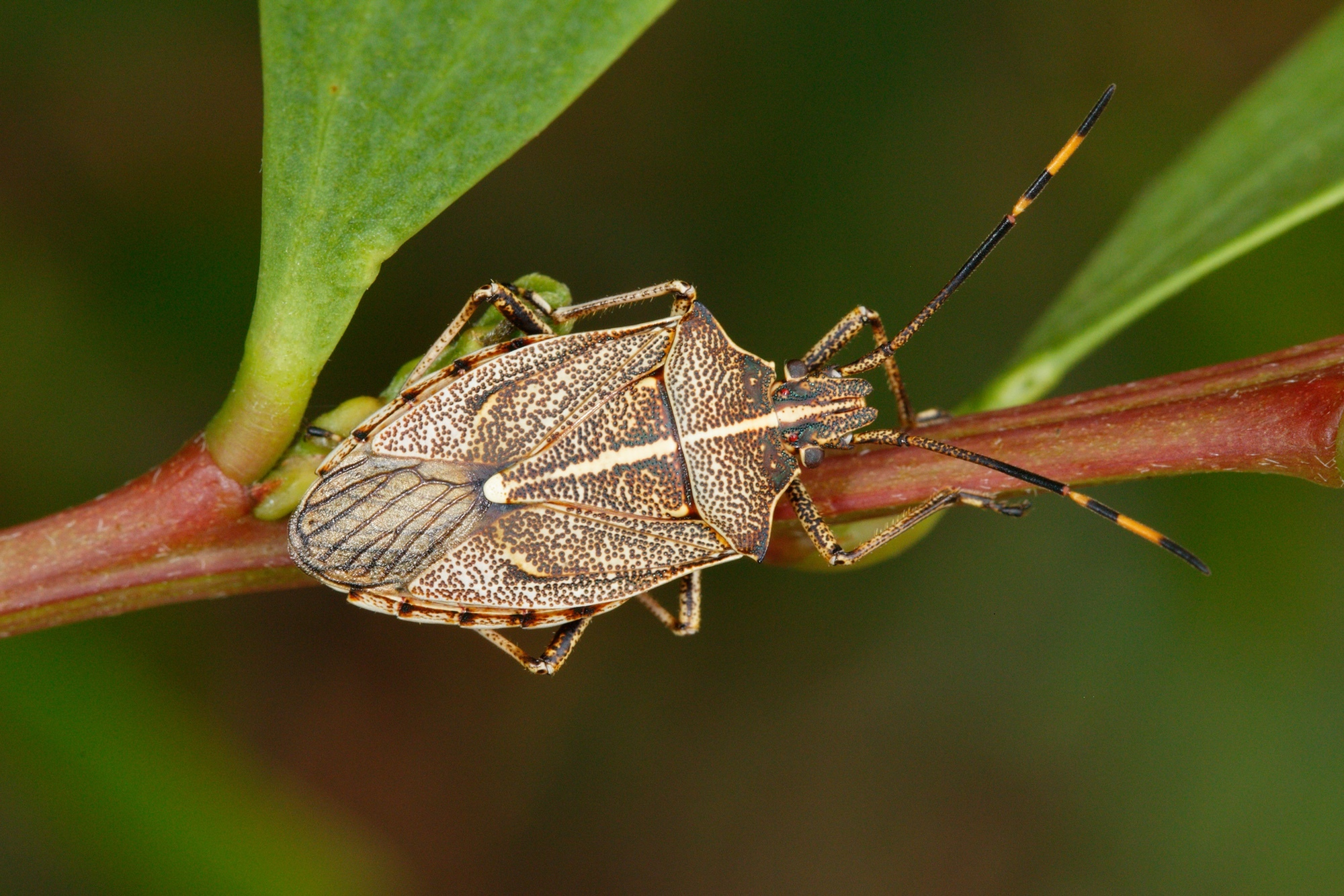
- Omyta centrolineata

Scientific classification
- Kingdom: Animalia
- Phylum: Arthropoda
- Clade: Pancrustacea
- Class: Insecta
- Order: Hemiptera
- Suborder: Heteroptera
- Family: Pentatomidae
- Subfamily: Pentatominae
- Genus: Omyta; Spinola, 1850

= Omyta =

Genus of stink bugs

Omyta is a genus of stink bugs, the family Pentatomidae. It contains the following species:

- Omyta centrolineata (Westwood, 1837)
- Omyta delineata Stål, 1865
- Omyta spinosa (Dallas, 1851)
