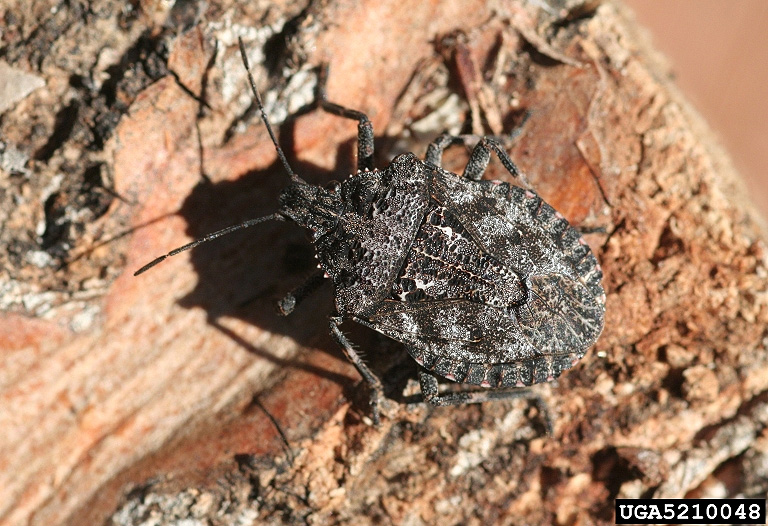

Scientific classification
- Domain: Eukaryota
- Kingdom: Animalia
- Phylum: Arthropoda
- Class: Insecta
- Order: Hemiptera
- Suborder: Heteroptera
- Family: Pentatomidae
- Genus: Brochymena
- Species: B. sulcata

Binomial name
- Brochymena sulcata Van Duzee, 1918

= Brochymena sulcata =

Species of true bug

Brochymena sulcata is a species of stink bug in the family Pentatomidae. It is found in North America.

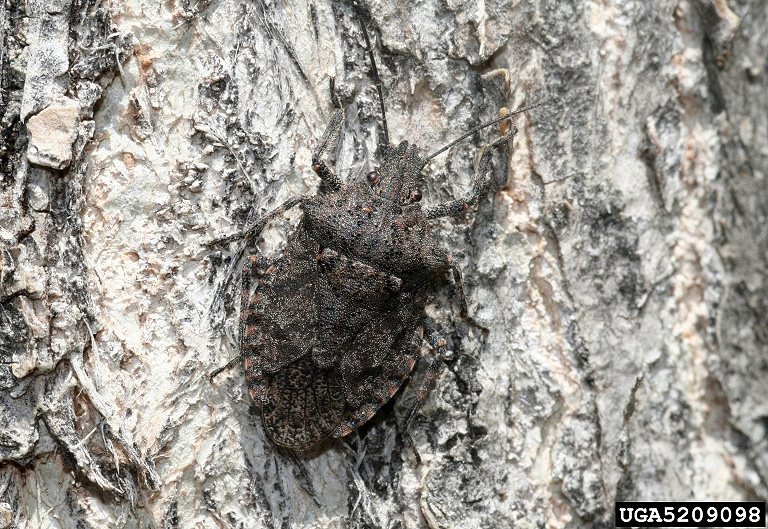
