= Halys (bug) =

- Halys sp.

Scientific classification
- Kingdom: Animalia
- Phylum: Arthropoda
- Clade: Pancrustacea
- Class: Insecta
- Order: Hemiptera
- Suborder: Heteroptera
- Family: Pentatomidae
- Subfamily: Pentatominae
- Tribe: Halyini
- Genus: Halys; Fabricius, 1803

Synonyms
- Halysius Rafinesque, 1815

Genus of true bugs

Halys is the type genus of shield bugs in the tribe Halyini, erected by Johann Christian Fabricius in 1803. Species have been recorded from South-East Europe through to India and Sri Lanka.

== Species ==
As of October 2026, BioLib includes the following:

subgenus Halys Fabricius, 1803

1. Halys brocchus Gapon, 2023
2. Halys hedenborgi Stål, 1865
3. Halys jizanus Linnavuori, 1986
4. Halys maculipennis Stål, 1865
5. Halys magna Chopra, 1974
6. Halys persa Bergroth, 1919
7. Halys rugosa Distant, 1921
8. Halys serrigera Westwood, 1837
9. Halys sulcata (Thunberg, 1783) - type species (as Halys dentata Fabricius, 1803 - by subsequent designation)

subgenus Pseudocoenomorpha Schumacher, 1913

1. Halys clausnitzeri Schumacher, 1913
2. Halys simplinervis Bergroth, 1906

unplaced in a subgenus

1. Halys lahorensis Shaikh, 2009
2. Halys mudigerensis Salini, 2019
3. Halys pakistanensis Shaikh, 2009
4. Halys shaista Ghauri, 1988
5. Halys shikarpuriensis Shaikh, 2009
6. †Halys bruckmanni Heer, 1853
7. †Halys spectabilis Heer, 1865
