= Halyini =

- Halys sp.: type genus

Scientific classification
- Kingdom: Animalia
- Phylum: Arthropoda
- Clade: Pancrustacea
- Class: Insecta
- Order: Hemiptera
- Suborder: Heteroptera
- Family: Pentatomidae
- Subfamily: Pentatominae
- Tribe: Halyini; Amyot & Serville, 1843

Genera
- See text

Tribe of true bugs

Halyini is a tribe of shield bugs in the subfamily Pentatominae. Databases such as BugGuide, Integrated Taxonomic Information System, and Encyclopedia of Life record at least 20 described species from the Americas. More recent revisions such as that presented in Invasive Stink Bugs and Related Species (Pentatomoidea) (2018), indicate many other genera in the Halyini, with a worldwide distribution; however it has also been described as a "wastebasket taxon" for numerous genera, many of which might be placed in other tribes.

== Genera ==
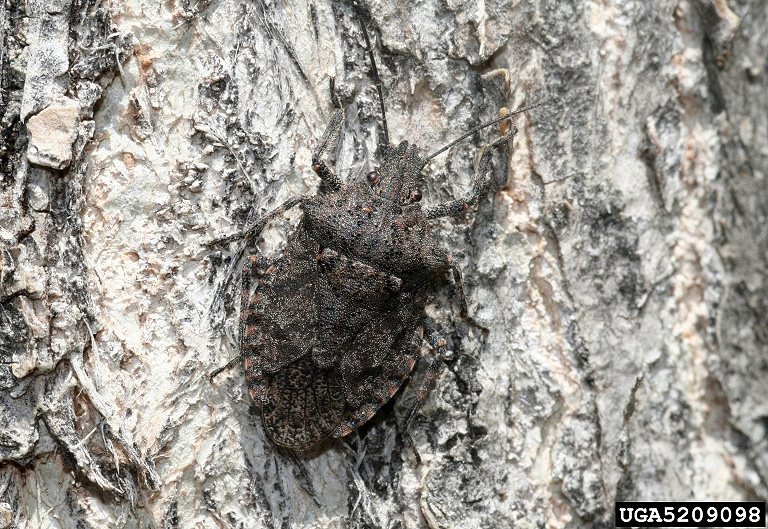
Brochymena sulcata

Ouscha viridissima

The genera of Halyini were reviewed in McPherson's 2018 revision. As of October 2026 BioLib includes the following:

1. Abadia (bug) Cachan, 1952
2. Accarana Distant, 1888
3. Acuticeps Cachan, 1952
4. Aglaophon (bug) Stål, 1876
5. Alcaeus Dallas, 1851
6. Ameridalpa Ghauri, 1982
7. Anchises (bug) Stål, 1868
8. Anolcus Bergroth, 1893
9. Apodiphus Spinola, 1837
10. Artiazontes Distant, 1881
11. Asyla (bug) Walker, 1867
12. Atelias Kirkaldy, 1904
13. Atelocera Laporte, 1833
14. Austromalaya Kirkaldy, 1908
15. Auxentius (bug) Horváth, 1915
16. Babylas (bug) Horváth, 1915
17. Baracellus Distant, 1903
18. Bathrus Dallas, 1851
19. Bourginia Cachan, 1952
20. Brizica Walker, 1867
21. Brochymena Amyot & Serville, 1843
22. Bromocoris Horváth, 1915
23. Cahara Ghauri, 1978
24. Candravastra Gapon, 2024
25. Carduelicoris Kment, 2013
26. Carenoplistus Jakovlev, 1882
27. Coctoteris Stål, 1858
28. Coenomorpha Dallas, 1851
29. Dalpada Amyot & Serville, 1843
30. Dendrites (bug) Kirkaldy, 1909
31. Dictyometis Gross, 1976
32. Dippilana Distant, 1910
33. Ectenus Dallas, 1851
34. Elemana Distant, 1912
35. Epitoxicoris Wall, 2007
36. Erthesina Spinola, 1837
37. Eupaleopada Ghauri, 1982
38. Eurus (bug) Dallas, 1851
39. Faizuda Ghauri, 1988
40. Goilalaka Ghauri, 1972
41. Halys Fabricius, 1803
42. Iskenderia Kiritshenko, 1952
43. Izharocoris Afzal & Ahmad, 1981
44. Jugalpada Ghauri, 1975
45. Lodosocoris Ahmad & Afzal, 1986
46. Meridalpa Ghauri, 1982
47. Meridindia Ghauri, 1982
48. Mezessea Linnavuori, 1982
49. Mimikana Distant, 1912
50. Munduala Distant, 1910
51. Mustha Amyot & Serville, 1843
52. Neagenor Bergroth, 1891
53. Neohalys Ahmad & Perveen, 1982
54. Neolodosocoris Memon & Ahmad, 2002
55. Neoptolemus (bug) Horváth, 1915
56. Neosurenus Distant, 1920
57. Nesagaeus Bergroth, 1906
58. Nesobius Bergroth, 1906
59. Nevisanus Distant, 1893
60. Omyta Spinola, 1850
61. Orthoschizops Spinola, 1850
62. Ouscha Distant, 1921
63. Parabrochymena Larivière, 1992
64. Paragenor Gross, 1976
65. Paranevisanus Distant, 1908
66. Parapoecilometis Gross, 1976
67. Peltasticus Dallas, 1851
68. Platycoris Guérin-Méneville, 1831
69. Poecilometis Dallas, 1851
70. Polycarmes Stål, 1867
71. Pseudatelus Linnavuori, 1982
72. Salixocoris Ahmad & Abbasi, 1974
73. Saontarana Distant, 1918
74. Sarju (bug) Ghauri, 1977
75. Scribonia (bug) Stål, 1865
76. Sinometis Zheng & Liu, 1987
77. Solenogaster Reuter, 1887
78. Solomonius Wall, 2007
79. Surenus Distant, 1901
80. Tachengia China, 1925
81. Theseus Stål, 1867
82. Tinganina Bergroth, 1909
83. Tipulparra Ghauri, 1980
84. Tmetopis Kiritshenko, 1947
85. Vadonidea Cachan, 1952
86. Zaplutus Bergroth, 1893
