= Murgantia =

Murgantia may refer to:

- a synonym for Morgantina, an archaeological site in east central Sicily, southern Italy
- Murgantia (bug), a shield bug genus in the tribe Pentatomini
