= Melzi =

Africa Proconsularis (125 AD)

Melzi was a civitas (town) of the Roman Empire during late antiquity. It was also known as Meditanus.

The town was in the Medjerda River valley of northern Tunisia. It was a civitas of the Roman province of Africa Proconsularis, And the town has been tentatively identified with ruins at the Oued-Melzi Wadi and the Bagrada river confluence.

In antiquity the town was also the seat of a Christian bishopric, suffragan of the Archdiocese of Carthage.

There are two documented bishops of this African dioceses.

- Valerio was convicted, along with other supporters of the Donatist bishops Maximian, in the Donatist Council of Bagai of 394.
- The Catholic bishop Tutus, who participated in the Council of Carthage of 411, (the town had no Donatist bishops at that time). Tutus himself was present with two other councils of Carthage, celebrated in 416 and 424.

The town was mentioned by Augustine and Optatus
