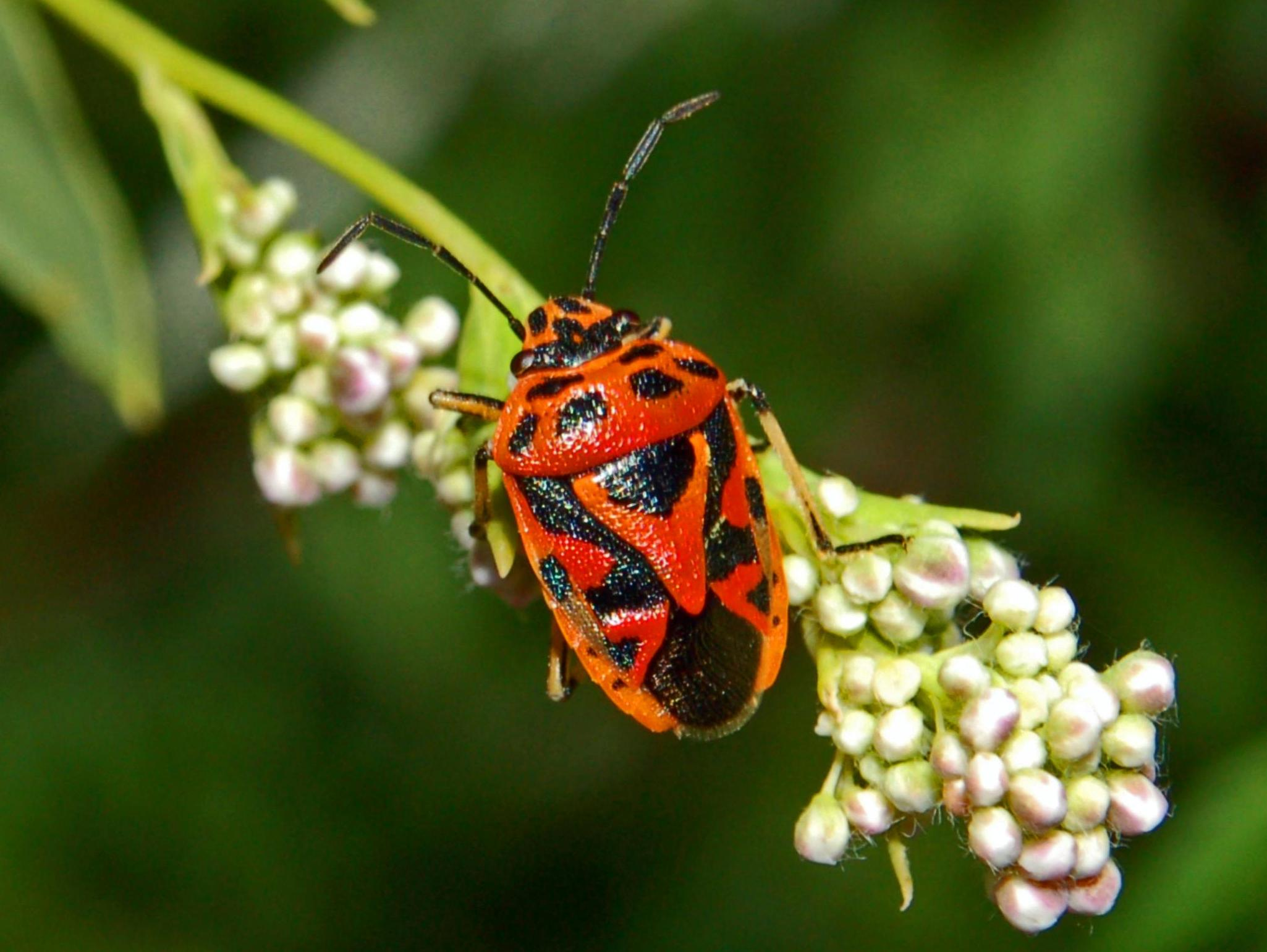

Scientific classification
- Kingdom: Animalia
- Phylum: Arthropoda
- Clade: Pancrustacea
- Class: Insecta
- Order: Hemiptera
- Suborder: Heteroptera
- Family: Pentatomidae
- Genus: Eurydema
- Species: E. ornata

Binomial name
- Eurydema ornata (Linnaeus, 1758)

Synonyms
- Cimex ornatus Linnaeus, 1758 (original name); Pentatoma ornatum (Linnaeus, 1758); Eurydema decoratum (Herrich-Schäffer, 1833)

= Eurydema ornata =

Red Cabbage Bug

Species of true bug

Eurydema ornata, sometimes called the "red cabbage bug", is a species of Palaearctic and Oriental realm shield bugs in the tribe Strachiini.

== Description ==
Eurydema ornata can reach a length of 7–8 millimetres (0.28–0.31 in). The body has gray or bright red colors, with black markings. Sometimes it shows the red patches coloured white and yellowish-green. This shield bug sucks the sap of plants, especially crucifers (family Brassicaceae), such as cabbage, cress and radish. It may become a parasite that can damage crops. It overwinters as an adult. The nymph is pale yellow and orange with dark brown or black pronotum and markings on the dorsal side of the abdomen.

== Distribution ==
This species occurs in Europe, North Africa, South and western Asia. It prefers open areas with low vegetation.

== Gallery ==
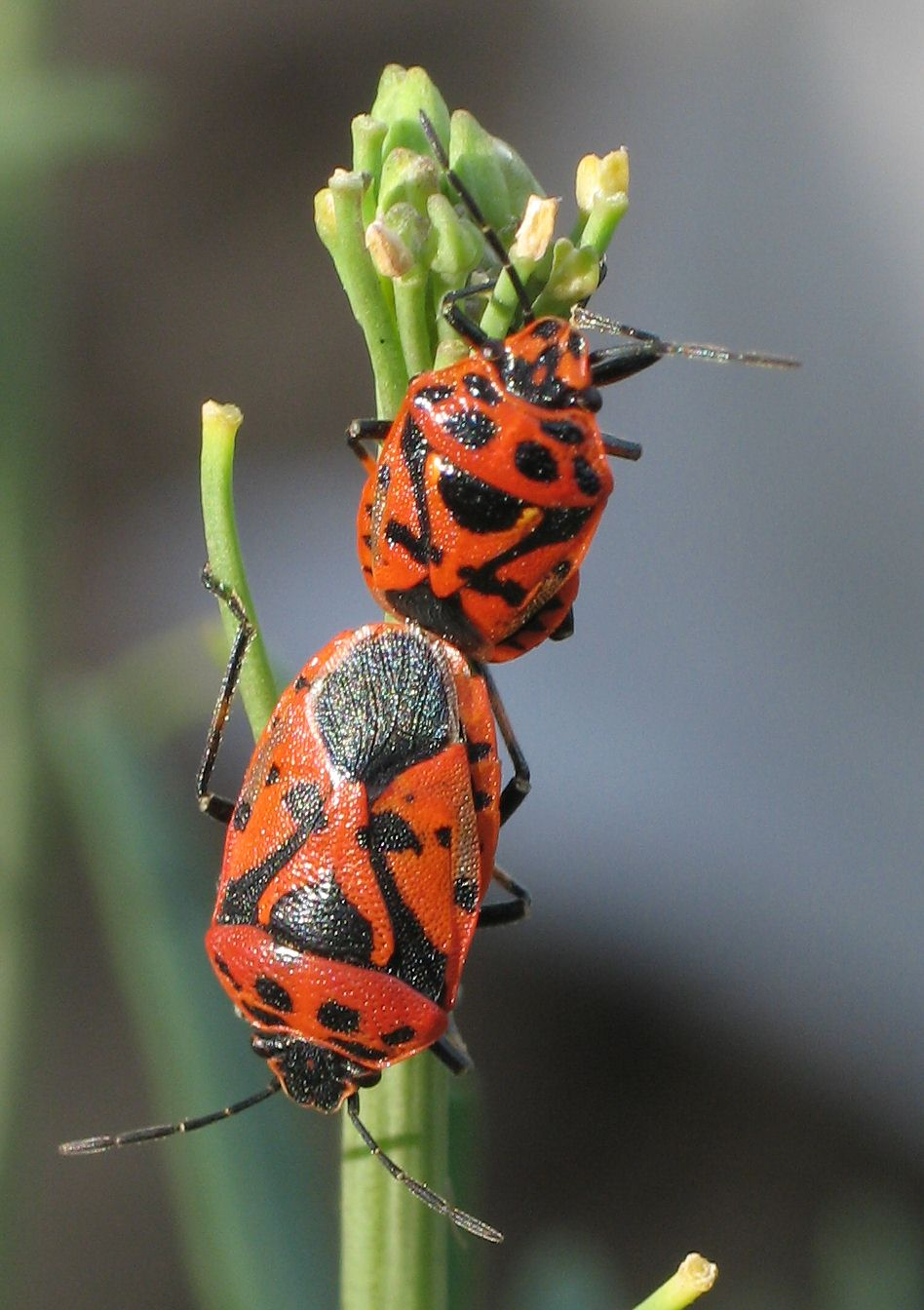
Pair mating

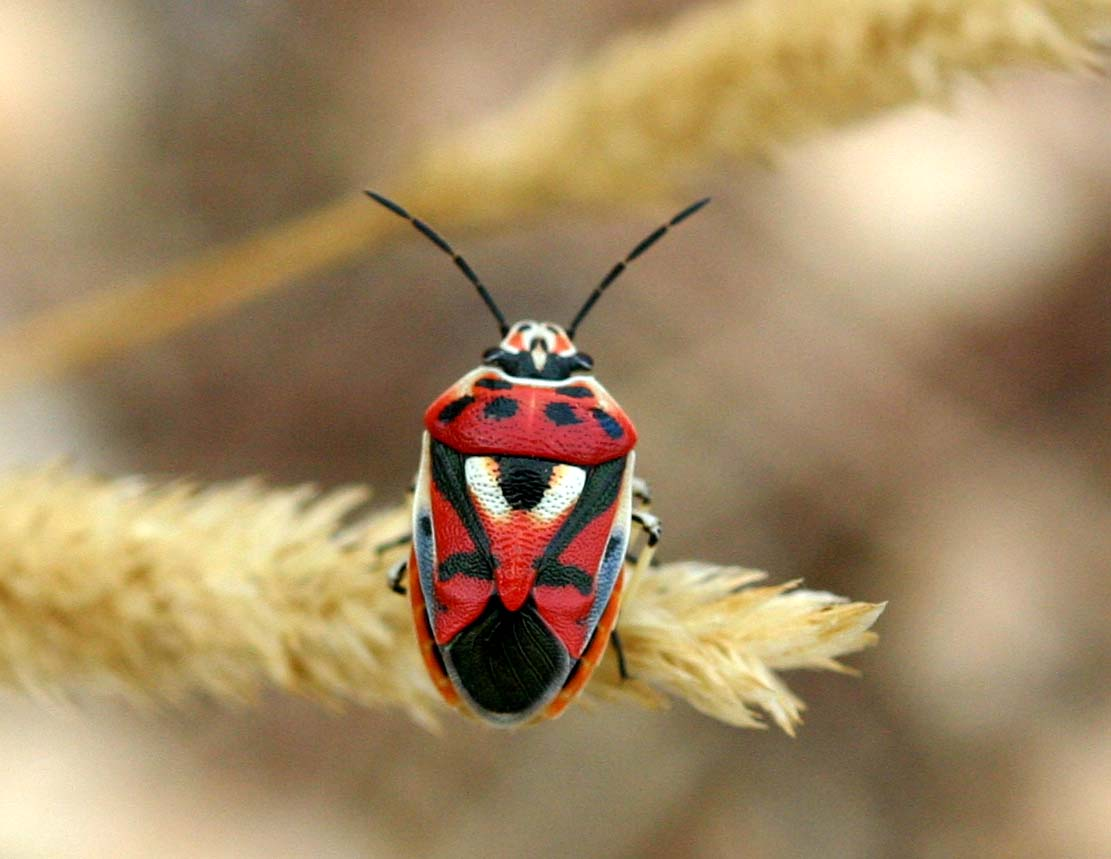
Adult
