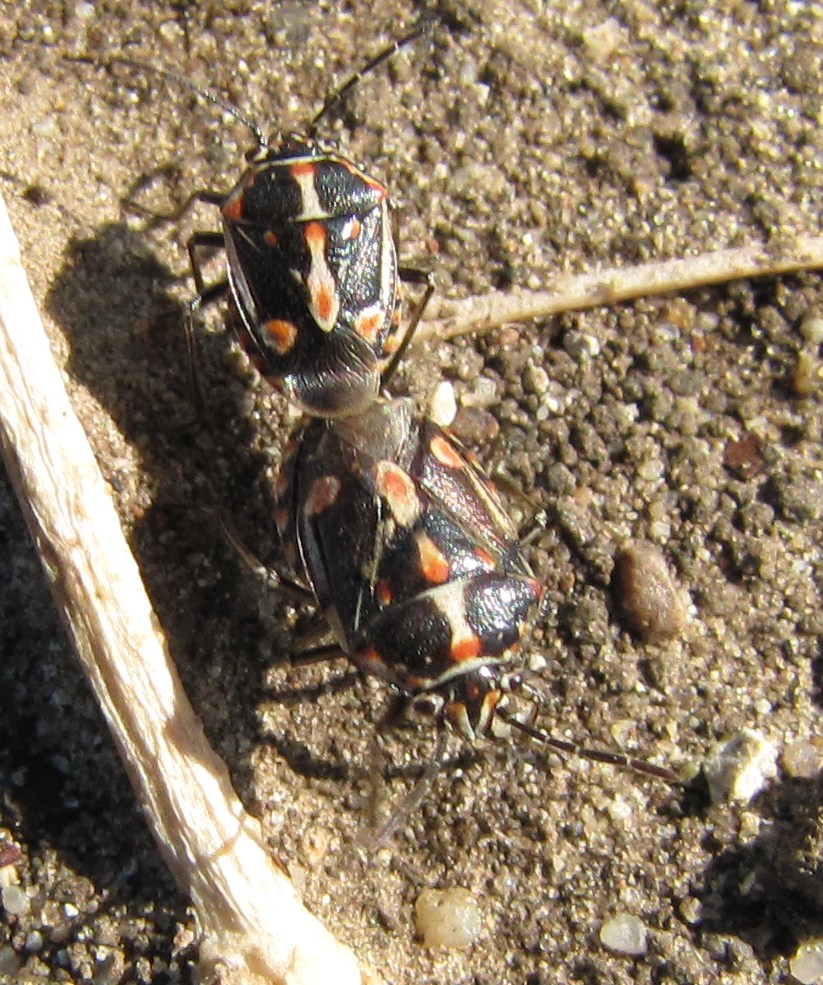
- Mating

Scientific classification
- Kingdom: Animalia
- Phylum: Arthropoda
- Class: Insecta
- Order: Hemiptera
- Suborder: Heteroptera
- Family: Pentatomidae
- Genus: Bagrada
- Species: B. hilaris

Binomial name
- Bagrada hilaris (Burmeister, 1835)

Synonyms
- Bagrada cruciferarum

= Bagrada hilaris =

Species of true bug

Bagrada hilaris is a species of shield bug known by the common names bagrada bug and painted bug. It could be mistaken for or erroneously referred to as harlequin bug. It is native to southeastern Africa. It is known elsewhere as an introduced species, including California and Arizona, where it was first reported in 2008. It is a major pest insect of Brassica oleracea crops (including cabbage, kale, cauliflower, Brussels sprouts, and broccoli), and related crucifers such as turnips, rape, and mustard. The adult and nymph of the species suck sap from the leaves of the plants, causing wilting, yellowing, and stunting of growth. Besides crucifers, the bugs are known on papaya, sorghum, maize, potato, cotton, caper, pearl millet, and some legumes. Large numbers of the bug congregate on the plants and cause extensive damage.

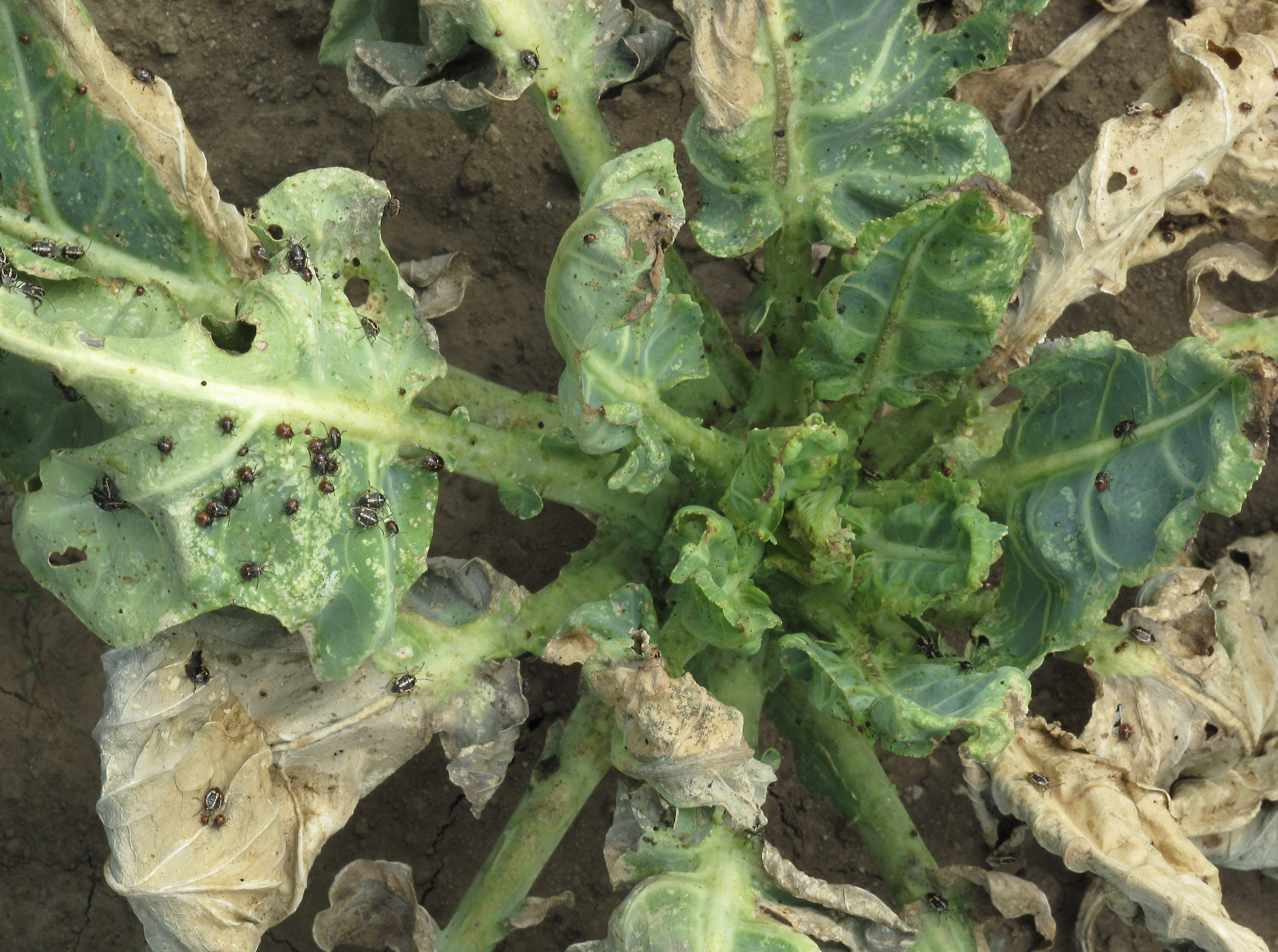
Several stages of Bagrada hilaris, Los Angeles 2010

The adult bug is 5 to 7 millimeters in length, shield-shaped, and black with white and orange markings. The female, which is larger than the male, lays up to 100 oval or barrel-shaped eggs on leaves or in soil beneath plants. The eggs are white when freshly deposited and turn orange over time. Within 8 days the first-instar nymph emerges. It is bright orange-red and turns darker as it develops, becoming black by the last instar.

The bug made a sudden appearance in Los Angeles in June, 2008, its first sighting in the Western Hemisphere. It then moved into the cropland of the heavily agricultural Coachella and Imperial Valleys of California, doing damage to cole crops there, especially those grown organically. By September 2014 it had reached as far north as San Mateo, Santa Cruz, Merced and Inyo counties, and all California counties to the south except Tulare County. As of 2020, it was found as far north as Yolo County.

Past infestations have been reported in India. It was found for the first time in Chile in 2016, where it rapidly established and began generating economic loss as well as invading homes in several Chilean localities.

A 2019 study found the eggs of invasive B. hilaris in Mexico being parasitized by a new species of parasitoid wasp, Idris elba (named after the actor of the same name). I. elba has thus been identified as a potential control agent for B. hilaris, which may benefit the broccoli crops that B. hilaris infests.

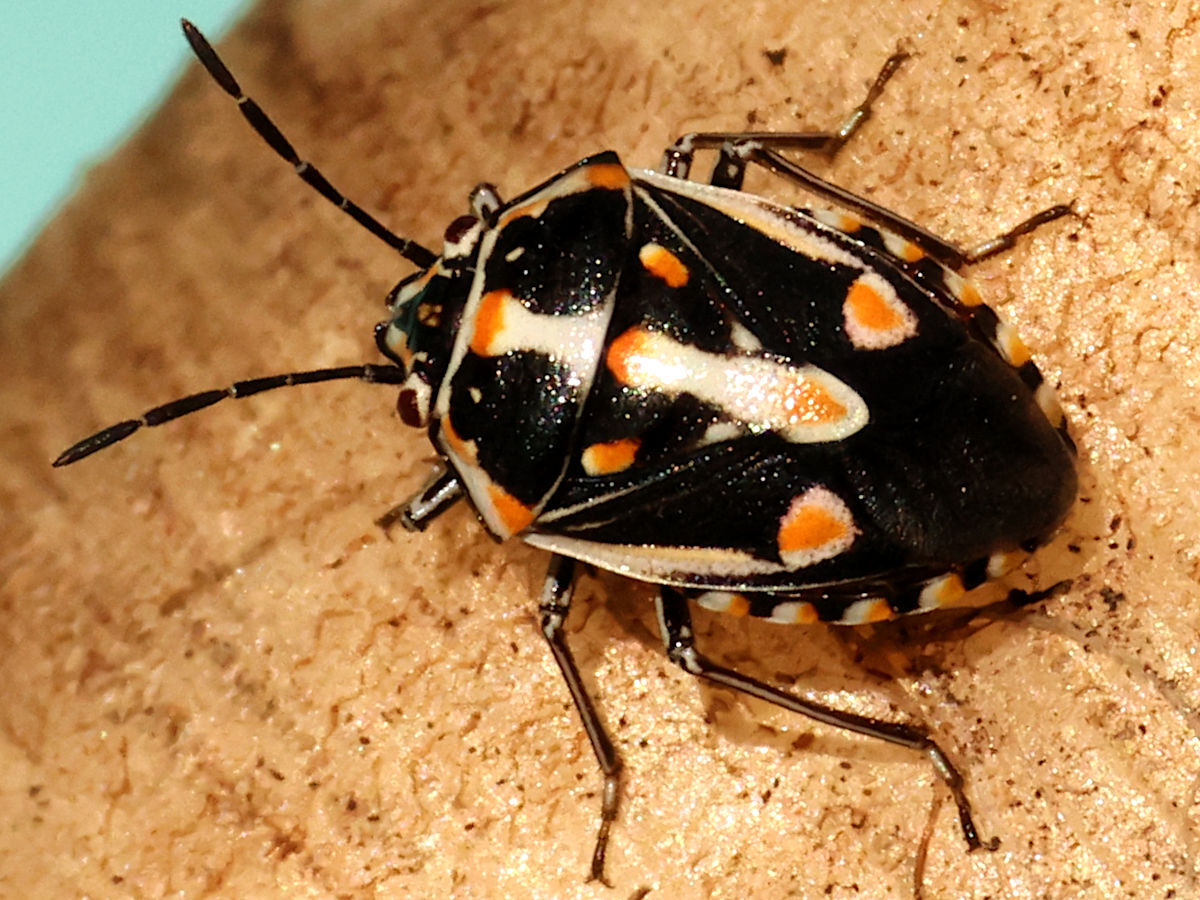
dorsal view

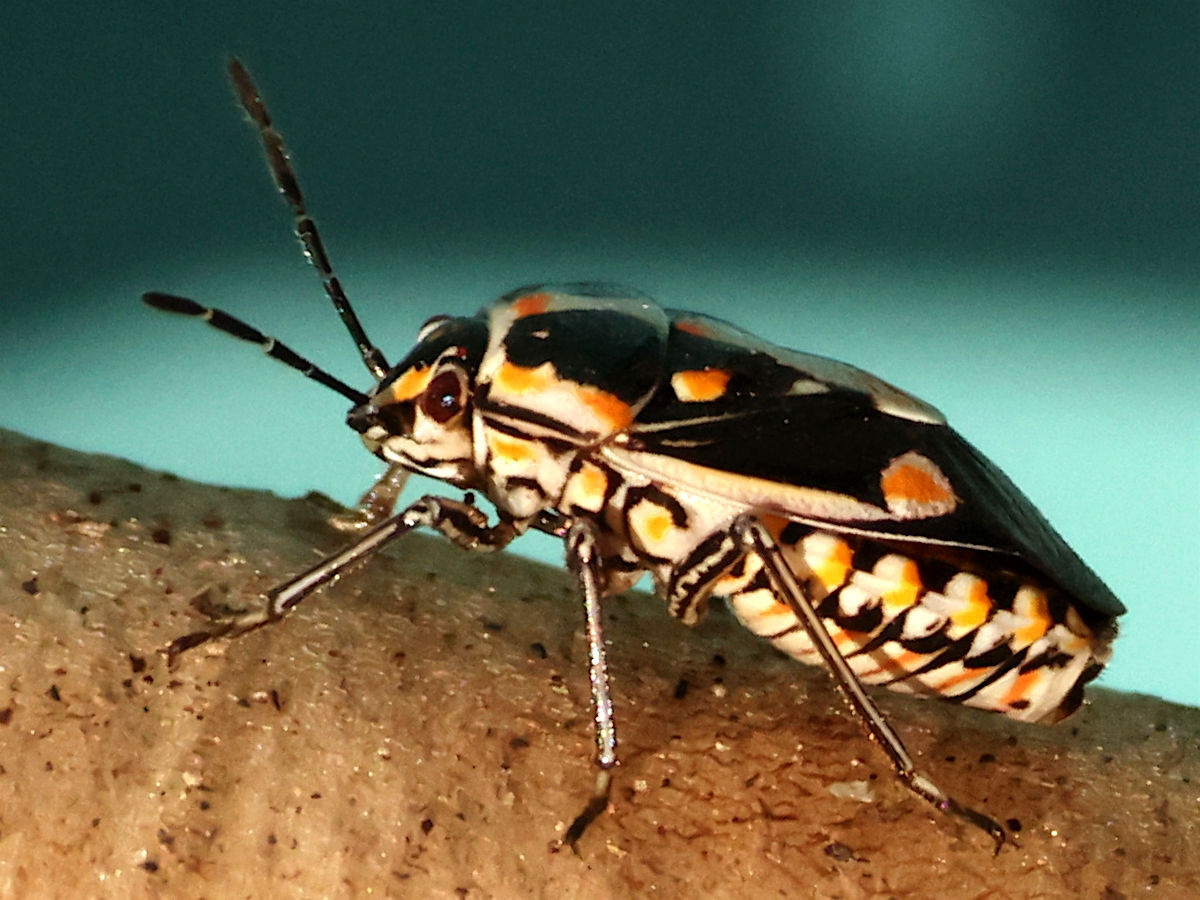
profile view
