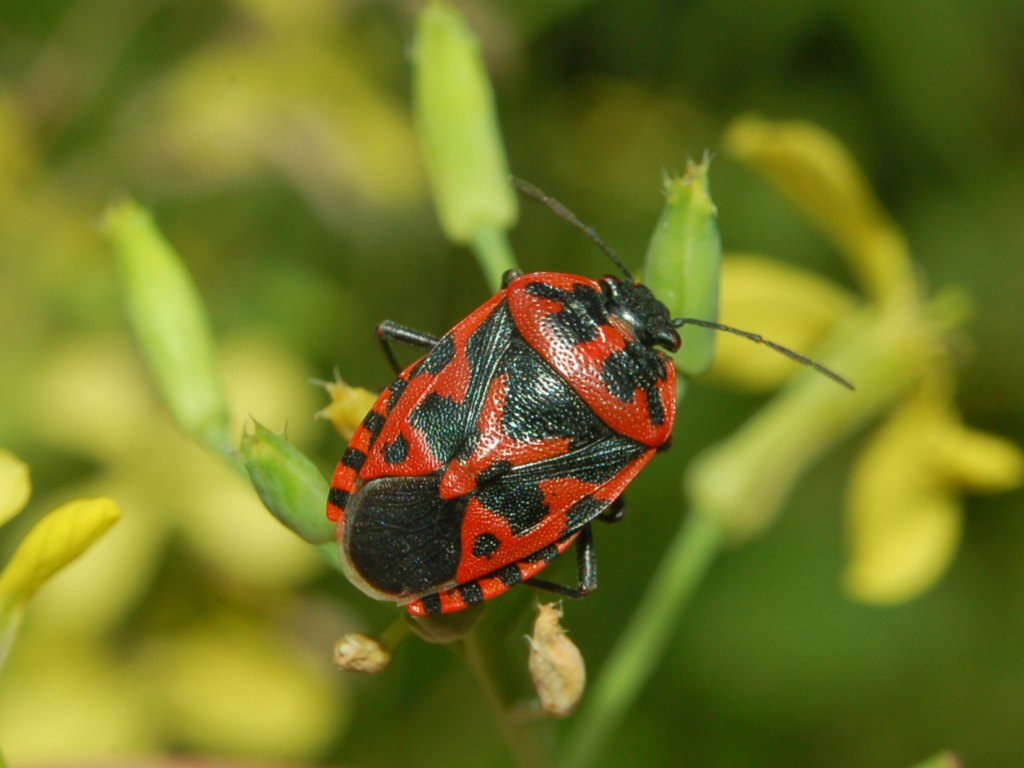

Scientific classification
- Domain: Eukaryota
- Kingdom: Animalia
- Phylum: Arthropoda
- Class: Insecta
- Order: Hemiptera
- Suborder: Heteroptera
- Family: Pentatomidae
- Genus: Eurydema
- Species: E. ventralis

Binomial name
- Eurydema ventralis Kolenati, 1846

Synonyms
- Euridema ventrale (Kolenati, 1846); Rubrodorsalium ventralis (Kolenati, 1846)

= Eurydema ventralis =

Species of true bug

Eurydema ventralis is a shield bug of the family Pentatomidae, subfamily Pentatominae. The species was first described by Friedrich August Rudolph Kolenati in 1846.

== Description ==
Eurydema ventralis has a length of about 10 millimetres (0.39 in). It typically has a two-tone coloration, yellow or red with black markings. The body is flattened, the head is rounded and the cheeks are sinuous with narrow edges. When the adults come out from the last instar they are white or ivory with black spots. They slowly reach the final red coloration, at first becoming yellow, then orange and finally red. The specimens completely white and black are immature.

This species can damage the cultivations of crucifers (family Brassicaceae) and sometimes also of potatoes and cereals.

== Life cycle ==
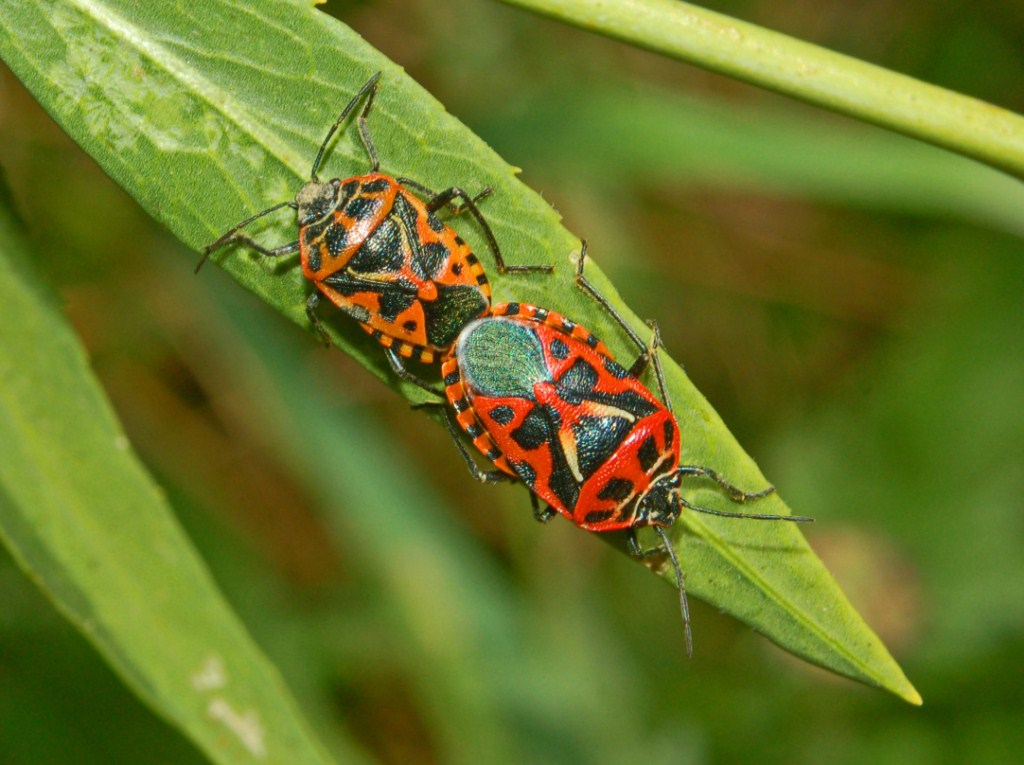
Mating pair

Adults overwinter, reappear in spring and attack the cabbages. In the first half of April mating begins, followed by the laying of eggs. At mid-May the nymphs hatch, reaching the maturity in June.

In summer, females lay the eggs of the second generation, this time both on crucifers and on other plants (rose, alfalfa). In July the eggs hatch and the larvae become mature in August. Adults of the second generation return on crucifers and remain there until September. At the first cold days of the autumn the adults take refuge in winter shelters.

== Distribution ==
This species can be found in most of Europe.

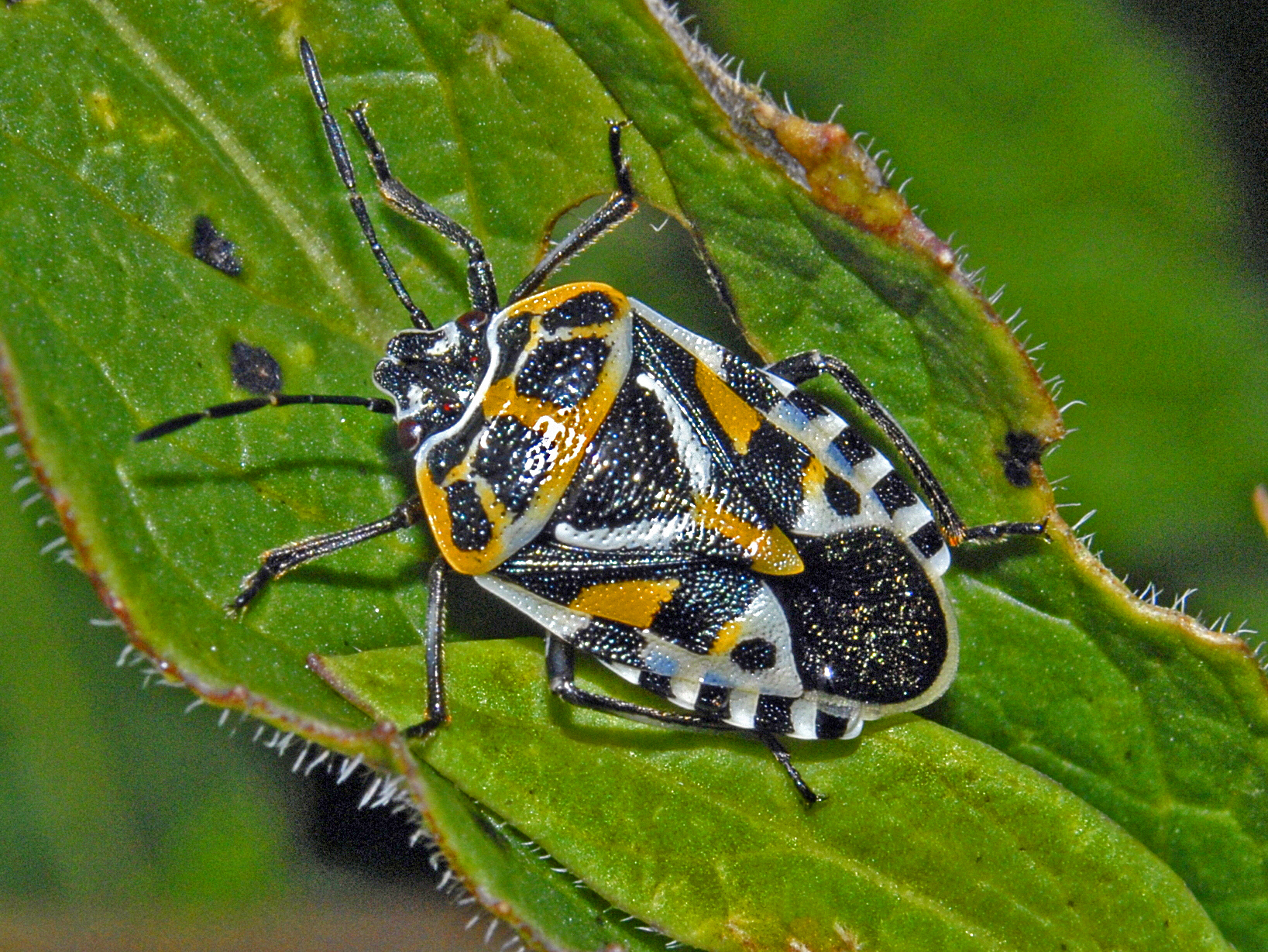
Young adult
