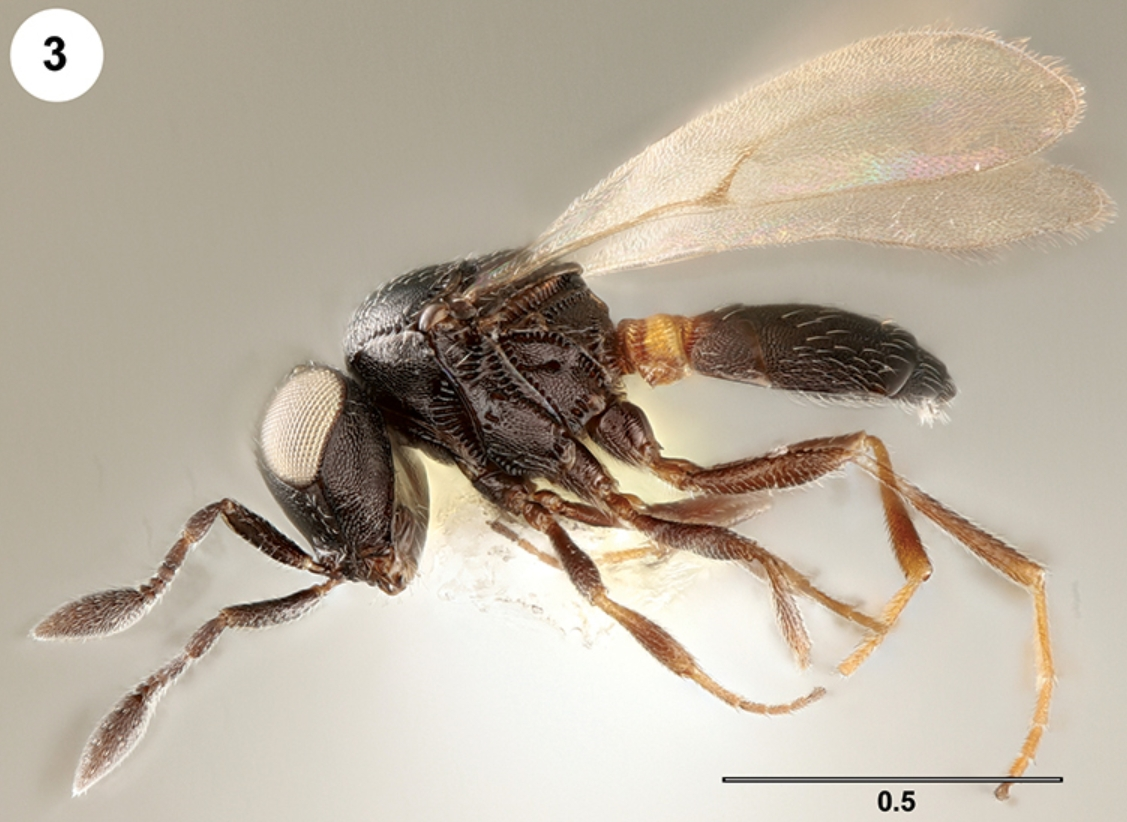
- Holotype

Scientific classification
- Kingdom: Animalia
- Phylum: Arthropoda
- Clade: Pancrustacea
- Class: Insecta
- Order: Hymenoptera
- Family: Scelionidae
- Genus: Idris
- Species: I. elba

Binomial name
- Idris elba Talamas, 2019

= Idris elba (wasp) =

Species of insect

Idris elba is a species of parasitic wasp in the family Scelionidae. It was discovered in Mexico, and described in 2019.

While all other species of Idris parasitize spiders, Idris elba parasitizes the eggs of Bagrada hilaris, a stink-bug. This may help with control of Bagrada hilaris, which is an agricultural pest, and an invasive species in many countries.

Idris elba is named for the British actor Idris Elba. The scientists who described the species originally claimed that "elba" was an "arbitrary combination of letters", though this was done to circumvent the rules of Latin grammar.

== Taxonomy ==
Idris elba was described in 2019.

The species was discovered in Guanajuato, Mexico. Specimens were also collected from New Mexico, United States, in 2008. The holotype, a female, was collected in Santa Cruz de Juventino Rosas, Mexico.

== Description ==
The bodies of females are 0.85–1.16 millimetres (0.033–0.046 in) long, and the bodies of males are 0.96–1.07 millimetres (0.038–0.042 in) long. The body is dark, with some lighter sections.

The antenna are black to pale brown. The jaws have three teeth, which are equal in size. The clypeus has six hairs. The back part of the head has a keel-like elevation.

Idris elba is morphologically similar to Idris howardi, but I. howardi can be distinguished through the size of the fovea on its netrion sulcus, the lateral striations on its propodeum, and the ventral part of its paracoxal sulcus being a simple furrow.

== Parasitism ==
Idris elba parasitizes the eggs of Bagrada hilaris, a species of stink-bug. The larvae emerge from and kill the eggs they parasitize.

Idris elba was the first species of Idris found to be associated with a host other than a spider. Lubomír Masner, an expert in parasitic wasps, described the discovery as "absolutely baffling". The association could be a result of accidental parasitism, as Bagrada hilaris lays eggs in the same places as spiders. Idris elba could also have switched to the bugs from a different host.

Specimens of Idris elba were found in New Mexico before Bagrada hilaris was first found in the state.

=== Agricultural significance ===
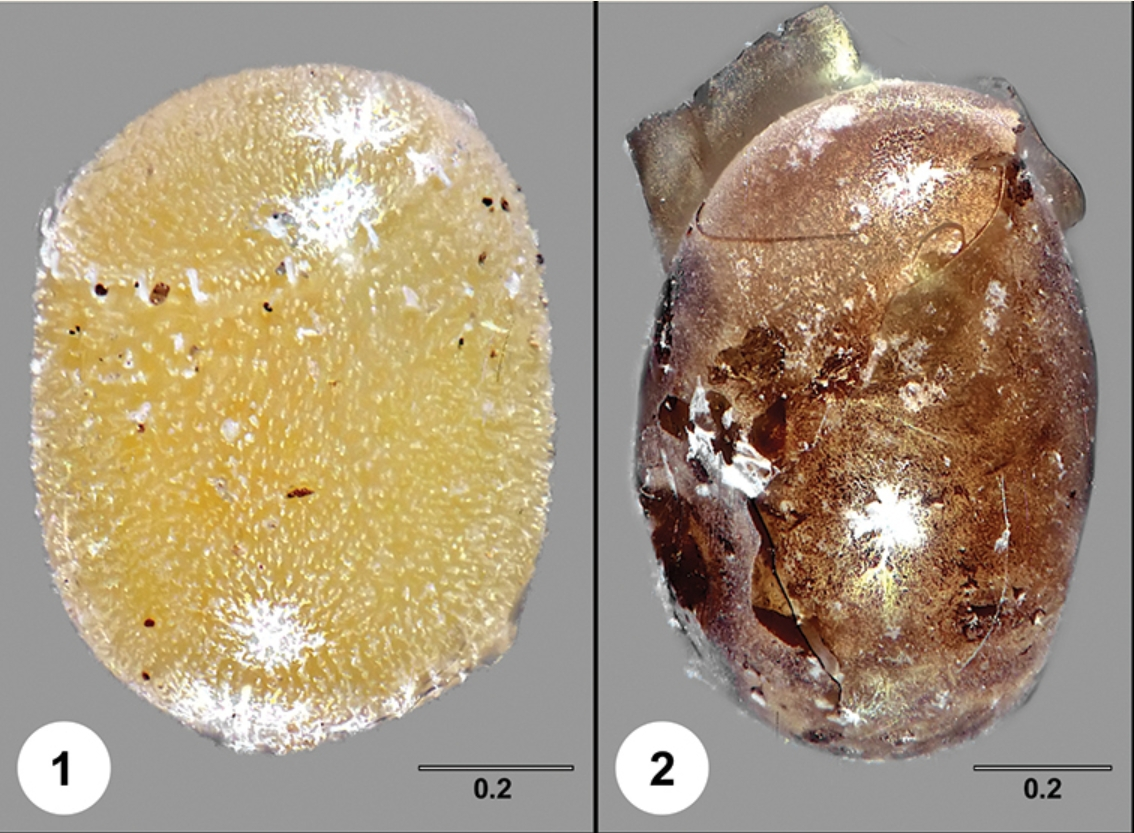
Unparasitized (left) and parasitized (right) eggs of Bagrada hilaris

Bagrada hilaris is an invasive species in the United States, Europe, Asia, and the Middle East. It infests vegetables such as broccoli and cauliflower.

Idris elba may help control Bagrada hilaris, serving as an alternative to artificial pesticides. It has been described as a "Heimdall-like" protector of crops, in reference to the character portrayed by the actor Idris Elba.

== Etymology ==
Before he described Idris elba, the taxonomist Elijah Talamas joked about naming a species after the actor of the same name. After discovering the species, Talamas named it Idris elba, as it was "too funny not to do it."

In the paper describing the species, the authors claimed that "elba" was an "arbitrary combination of letters". This was done to circumvent the rules of binomial nomenclature. If the name had been an explicit eponym, the rules of Latin grammar would require that the species be named Idris elbai.

On Twitter, Elba stated that he was "honoured" by the name.
