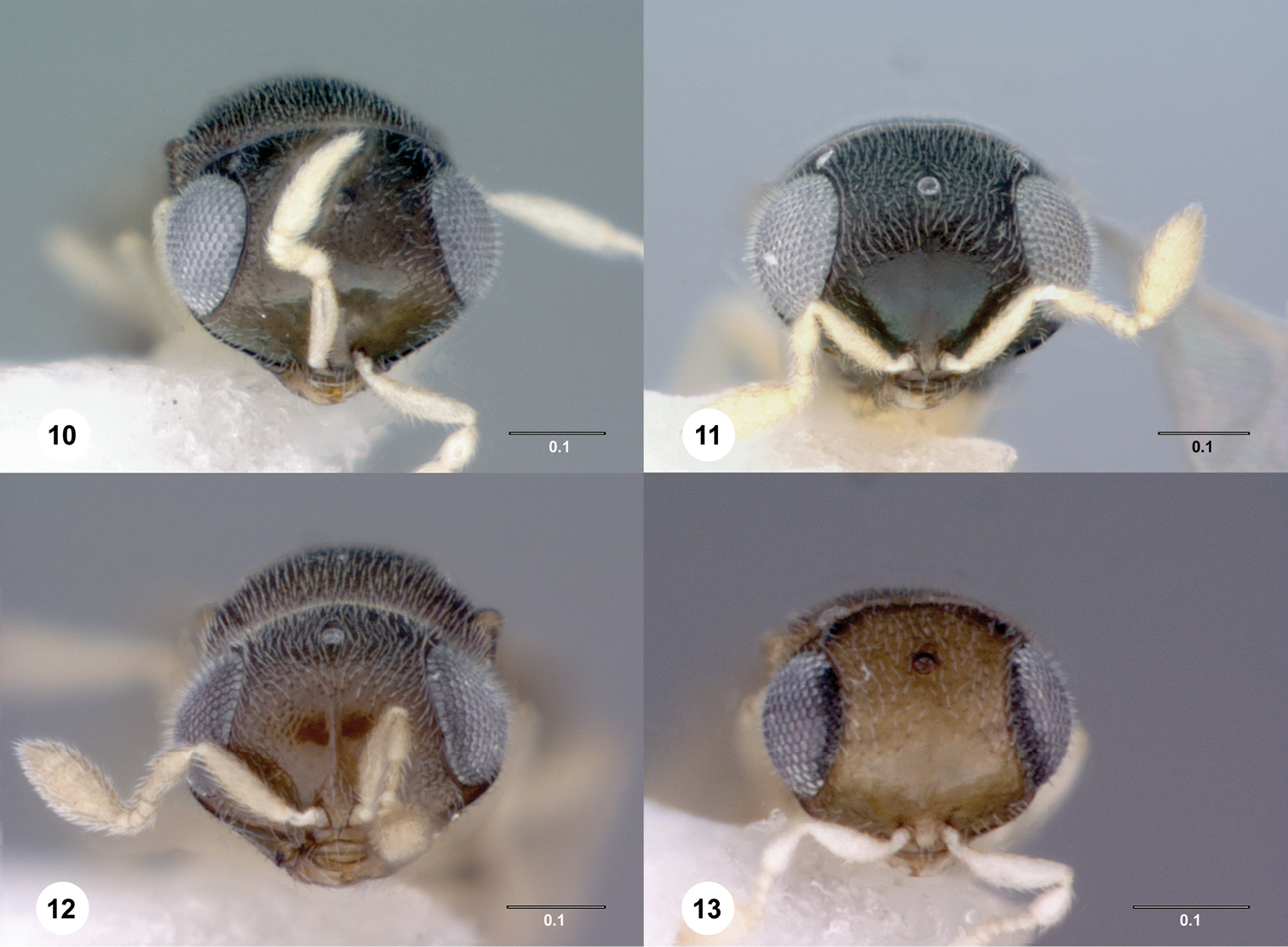
- Close shot of several Idris species

Scientific classification
- Kingdom: Animalia
- Phylum: Arthropoda
- Class: Insecta
- Order: Hymenoptera
- Family: Scelionidae
- Subfamily: Scelioninae
- Genus: Idris; Förster, 1856

Synonyms
- Acoloides Howard, 1889; Dissacolus Kieffer, 1926; Indris Ashmead, 1887; Tasmanacolus Hickman, 1968; Tasmanibaeus Hickman, 1968

= Idris (wasp) =

Genus of wasps

Idris is a genus of parasitic wasps in the family Scelionidae, containing about 160 described species. This genus is part of the tribe Baeini, which are egg parasitoids. Members of the genus Idris are mostly parasitoids of spider eggs, but at least one member of the genus uses stink bugs as hosts.

== Species ==
These 167 species belong to the genus Idris:

- Idris adikeshavus Veenakumari, 2015
- Idris aenea Ashmead, 1894
- Idris affinis Kononova, 2003
- Idris agraensis Mukerjee, 1981
- Idris alticola (Kieffer, 1913)
- Idris alticollis Kononova & Fursov, 2005
- Idris amplus (Dodd, 1914)
- Idris angustipennis (Dodd, 1914)
- Idris annexia Mukerjee, 1981
- Idris appangalus Mukerjee, 1981
- Idris arachnevora (Risbec, 1956)
- Idris ater (Szelényi, 1953)
- Idris aureonitens Szabó, 1965
- Idris aureus (Girault, 1911)
- Idris badius Johnson & Chen, 2018
- Idris balteus Johnson & Chen, 2018
- Idris benoiti (Risbec, 1958)
- Idris bicolor Kononova, 1995
- Idris bidentatus (Dodd, 1914)
- Idris brachystigmatis (Mani & Mukerjee, 1976)
- Idris brevicornis Veenakumari, 2015
- Idris brevifunicularis (Mani & Mukerjee, 1976)
- Idris brevis Sundholm, 1970
- Idris brunneus (Dodd, 1914)
- Idris carbo Kononova & Kozlov, 2001
- Idris castaneus Masner & Denis, 1996
- Idris chotanagpurensis (Mani & Mukerjee, 1976)
- Idris chrysion Masner & Denis, 1996
- Idris citrinus Kononova & Kozlov, 2001
- Idris cleon Kononova, 2001
- Idris clypealis Huggert, 1979
- Idris coloris Kononova, 1995
- Idris coorgensis (Mani & Mukerjee, 1976)
- Idris costatus Masner & Denis, 1996
- Idris coxalis (Kieffer, 1908)
- Idris cteatus (Walker, 1839)
- Idris cubensis (Gahan, 1932)
- Idris curtus Johnson & Chen, 2018
- Idris deergakombus Veenakumari, 2015
- Idris denkis Kozlov & Lê, 1987
- Idris densis Kozlov & Lê, 1987
- Idris dentatus Kononova & Kononova, 2001
- Idris desertorum (Priesner, 1951)
- Idris destructor Kozlov & Kononova, 2001
- Idris diversus (Wollaston, 1858)
- Idris dubarensis Mukerjee, 1981
- Idris dugandani (Girault, 1928)
- Idris dunensis (Mani, 1975)
- Idris elba Talamas, 2019
- Idris emertonii (Howard, 1891)
- Idris exilis Kononova, 2003
- Idris fasciatipennis (Girault, 1917)
- Idris fascipennis (Ashmead, 1894)
- Idris fecundulus (Brues, 1940)
- Idris filiformis Kononova & Fursov, 2005
- Idris flaviceps (Dodd, 1915)
- Idris flavicornis Förster, 1856
- Idris flavipes (Dodd, 1914)
- Idris flavoclavatus (Kieffer, 1908)
- Idris flavoris Kononova & Fursov, 2005
- Idris floridensis (Fouts, 1927)
- Idris fulgens Kononova & Kozlov, 2001
- Idris fusciceps Johnson & Chen, 2018
- Idris glabratus Huggert, 1979
- Idris glorior Kononova & Kozlov, 2001
- Idris glorius (Girault, 1926)
- Idris gordius Kononova, 2001
- Idris gracilis Kononova, 2003
- Idris helpidis (Hickman, 1967)
- Idris howardi (Ashmead, 1893)
- Idris hunnaheus (Mani, 1973)
- Idris hunnus Kozlov & Lê, 1987
- Idris ibericus Huggert, 1979
- Idris ilonkae Szabó & Oehlke, 1986
- Idris imitans Kononova, 1995
- Idris ixeutici (Hickman, 1967)
- Idris javensis (Girault, 1917)
- Idris keethami Mukerjee, 1981
- Idris khandalus Mukerjee, 1978
- Idris krygeri (Kieffer, 1910)
- Idris kuruanus (Mani & Mukerjee, 1976)
- Idris lacunatus Masner & Denis, 1996
- Idris lades Kozlov & Lê, 1987
- Idris lakshmani (Mani, 1939)
- Idris lamelliscutellaris Szabó, 1965
- Idris latus Kononova & Petrov, 1993
- Idris laudator Kononova & Kozlov, 2001
- Idris leedsi Masner & Denis, 1996
- Idris lentor Kononova, 1995
- Idris leuculus Kononova, 1995
- Idris limbus Kononova, 1995
- Idris linapteris Mukerjee, 1978
- Idris lopamudra Veenakumari, 2015
- Idris lucidiceps (Kieffer, 1910)
- Idris lucidus Kononova, 1995
- Idris luteipes (Crawford, 1910)
- Idris maculosus (Dodd, 1914)
- Idris magnus (Dodd, 1914)
- Idris malabaricus (Mani & Mukerjee, 1976)
- Idris martinae Mineo, 2014
- Idris maurus Kononova, 1995
- Idris melleus (Ashmead, 1893)
- Idris meridionalis Masner, 1961
- Idris minutus Dodd, 1913
- Idris mirabilis Kononova & Fursov, 2005
- Idris munnarensis Mukerjee, 1978
- Idris mysorensis Mukerjee, 1978
- Idris nautalis Kozlov & Lê, 1987
- Idris niger (Hickman, 1967)
- Idris nigricans Kononova & Kozlov, 2001
- Idris nigriceps Kononova, 1995
- Idris nigroclavatus (Kieffer, 1908)
- Idris obfuscatus (Mani & Mukerjee, 1976)
- Idris obscurans Kononova & Petrov, 2001
- Idris ochraceus (Ashmead, 1894)
- Idris onychion Masner & Denis, 1996
- Idris oobius Kozlov & Lê, 1987
- Idris ornatus Masner & Denis, 1996
- Idris ovalis Kozlov & Lê, 1987
- Idris ovi (Dodd, 1914)
- Idris peregrinus (Perkins, 1910)
- Idris petiolaris Sundholm, 1970
- Idris piceiventris (Kieffer, 1908)
- Idris priesneri Huggert, 1981
- Idris psammon Szabó, 1965
- Idris pulcher (Dodd, 1914)
- Idris pulvinus Masner & Denis, 1996
- Idris purus Kononova & Petrov, 1993
- Idris robertae Mineo, 2014
- Idris rufescens (Kieffer, 1908)
- Idris rufus (Dodd, 1914)
- Idris saitidis (Howard, 1890)
- Idris sanctijohani Mukerjee, 1981
- Idris santinii Mineo, 2014
- Idris sayadreus (Mani & Mukerjee, 1976)
- Idris scutellaris (Dodd, 1926)
- Idris semicastaneus (Kieffer, 1908)
- Idris semiflaviventris Veenakumari, 2021
- Idris semiflavus (Kieffer, 1908)
- Idris seminiger (Ashmead, 1893)
- Idris seminitidus (Dodd, 1914)
- Idris sexarticulatus (Dahl, 1912)
- Idris silvensis (Dodd, 1914)
- Idris sordidus (Dodd, 1914)
- Idris spadix (Hickman, 1967)
- Idris spartinae Masner & Denis, 1996
- Idris speciossissimus (Dodd, 1914)
- Idris splendidus (Dodd, 1914)
- Idris stigmaticus (Mani & Mukerjee, 1976)
- Idris striaegenalis Kozlov & Lê, 1987
- Idris striativentris (Kieffer, 1909)
- Idris subapterus (Ashmead, 1893)
- Idris subfuscus (Ashmead, 1894)
- Idris sucidus Kononova, 2001
- Idris teestai Veenakumari, 2015
- Idris tenerum Kononova & Petrov, 1993
- Idris theridii (Hickman, 1967)
- Idris timorensis (Girault, 1932)
- Idris triangularis Mukerjee, 1981
- Idris trispinosus (Girault, 1917)
- Idris triticola Masner & Denis, 1996
- Idris unicolor (Kieffer, 1910)
- Idris unifasciatipennis (Dodd, 1914)
- Idris velakkadaiensis Mukerjee, 1981
- Idris velox Kononova, 1995
- Idris vitreus Kononova, 1995
- Idris zonatus (Kieffer, 1910)
