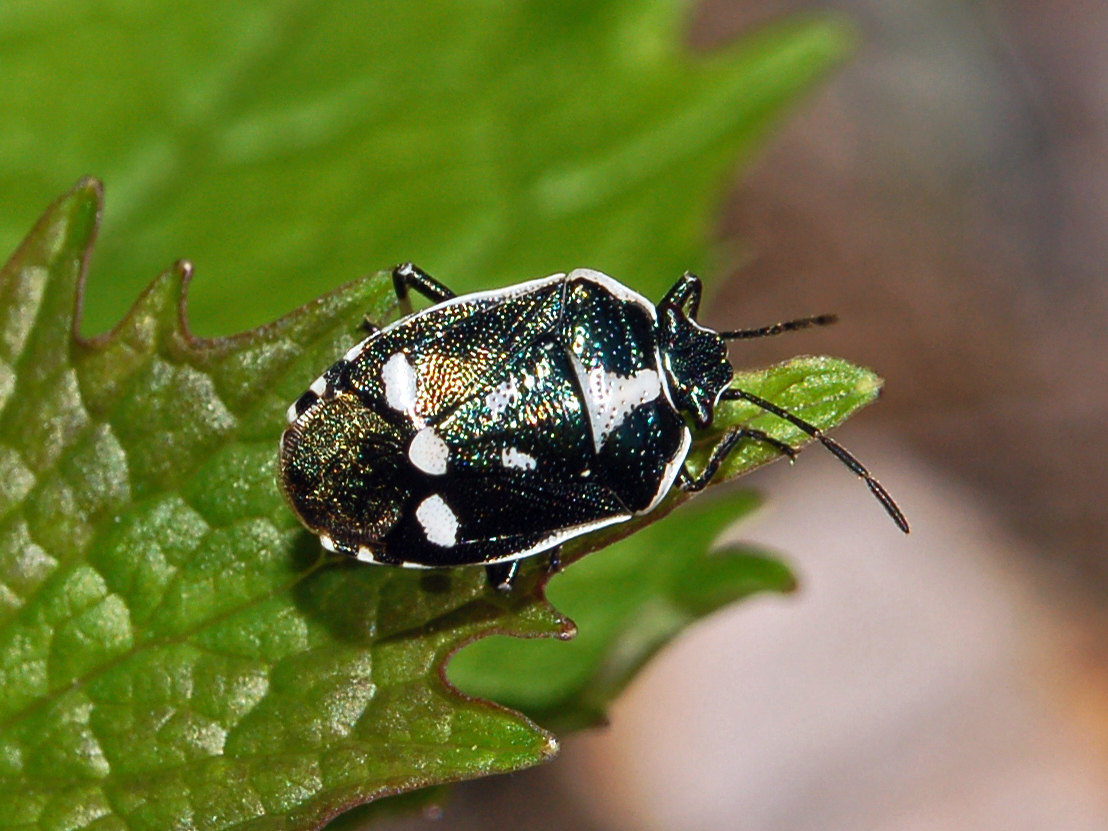
- Eurydema oleracea, yellow markings

Scientific classification
- Domain: Eukaryota
- Kingdom: Animalia
- Phylum: Arthropoda
- Class: Insecta
- Order: Hemiptera
- Suborder: Heteroptera
- Family: Pentatomidae
- Subfamily: Pentatominae
- Tribe: Strachiini
- Genus: Eurydema; Laporte de Castelnau, 1833

Synonyms
- Eurydemas Flor, 1860

= Eurydema =

Genus of true bugs

Eurydema is a genus of mostly Palaearctic shield bugs in the family Pentatomidae.

== Species ==
The following are included:

Subgenus Eurydema Laporte de Castelnau, 1833

- Eurydema eckerleini Josifov, 1961
- Eurydema gebleri Kolenati, 1846
- Eurydema herbacea (Herrich-Schaeffer, 1833)
- Eurydema laticollis Horváth, 1901
- Eurydema lundbladi Lindberg, 1960
- Eurydema nigriceps Reuter, 1844
- Eurydema oleracea (Linnaeus, 1758) – cabbage bug
- Eurydema ornata (Linnaeus, 1758)
- Eurydema putoni (Jakovlev, 1877)
- Eurydema sea Baena, Péricart & De la Rosa, 2004
- Eurydema syriaca Kirkaldy, 1909
- Eurydema wilkinsi Distant, 1879

Subgenus Horvatheurydema Dupuis, 1951

- Eurydema caligata Horváth, 1901
- Eurydema fieberi Schummel in Fieber, 1837
- Eurydema rotundicollis (Dohrn, 1860)
- Eurydema rugulosa (Dohrn, 1860)

Subgenus Rubrodorsalium Stichel, 1944

- Eurydema blanda Horváth, 1903
- Eurydema dominulus (Scopoli, 1763)
- Eurydema cyanea (Fieber, 1864)
- Eurydema liturifera (Walker, 1867)
- Eurydema maracandica Oshanin, 1871
- Eurydema montana Kerzhner
- Eurydema mrugowskyi Stichel, 1944
- Eurydema nana Fuente, 1971
- Eurydema pulchra (Westwood, 1837)
- Eurydema spectabilis Horváth, 1882
- Eurydema ventralis Kolenati, 1846

Unplaced to subgenus

- Eurydema alpina Ling, 1989
- Eurydema leucogaster Kiritshenko, 1963
- Eurydema lingi Rider, Zheng & Kerzhner, 2002
- Eurydema persica Lindberg, 1938
- Eurydema pulchrigena Kiritshenko, 1925
- Eurydema rugosa Motschulsky, 1861
