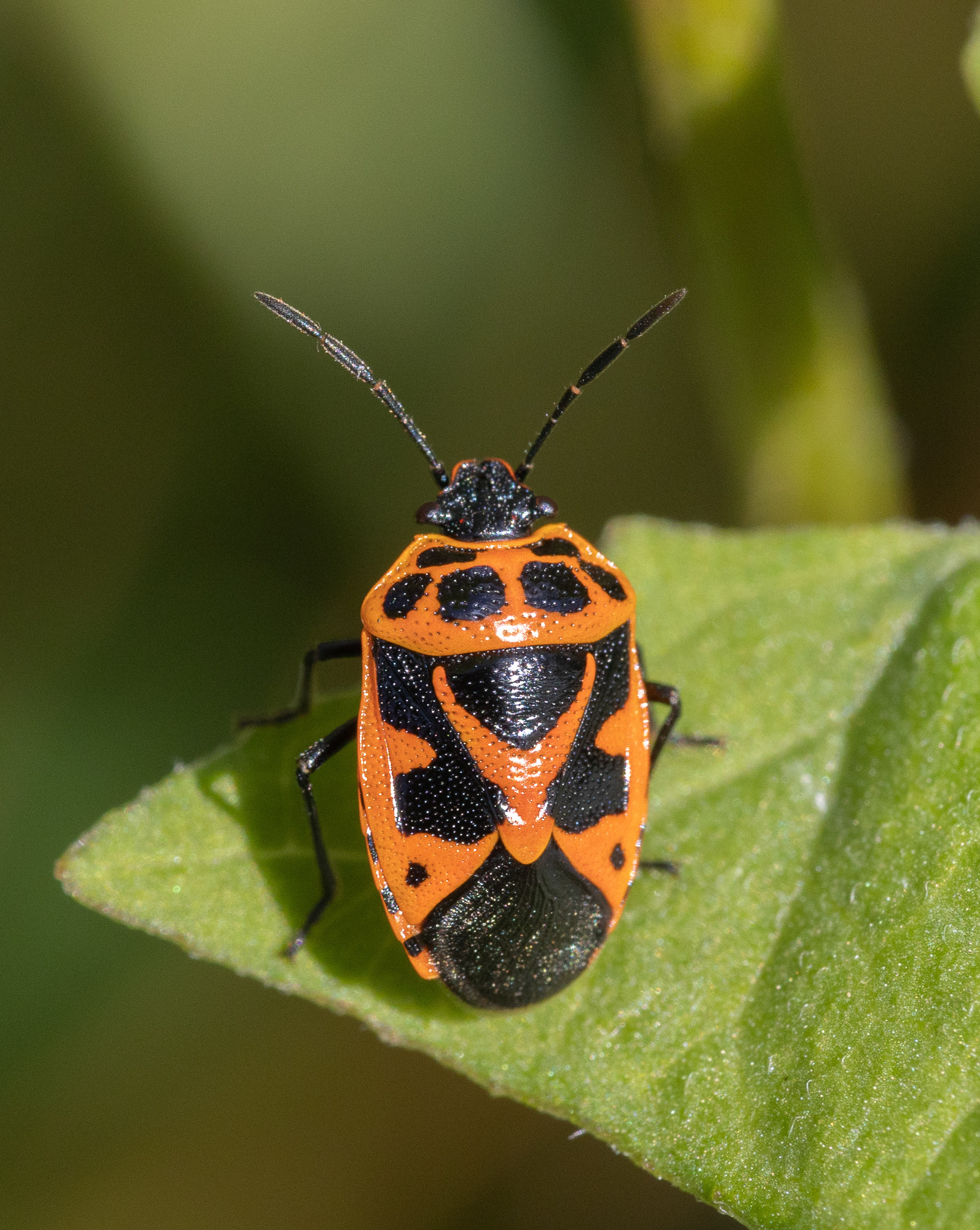

Scientific classification
- Kingdom: Animalia
- Phylum: Arthropoda
- Class: Insecta
- Order: Hemiptera
- Suborder: Heteroptera
- Family: Pentatomidae
- Genus: Eurydema
- Species: E. dominulus

Binomial name
- Eurydema dominulus (Scopoli, 1763)

= Eurydema dominulus =

Species of true bug

Eurydema dominulus, also known by its common name painted bug, is a cabbage bug from the genus Eurydema. The species was first described in 1763.

== Description ==
Eurydema dominulus is a cabbage bug that is vividly orange and black.

== Range ==
The bug is common in Japan (except Hokkaido), China, Taiwan, south-east Asia, India, north Australia and Europe..

== Ecology ==
The species is known as a pest for cruciferous vegetables, such as Chinese cabbage, Japanese radish and wasabi.
