= Afrania =

Scientific classification
- Kingdom: Animalia
- Phylum: Arthropoda
- Clade: Pancrustacea
- Class: Insecta
- Order: Hemiptera
- Suborder: Heteroptera
- Family: Pentatomidae
- Subfamily: Pentatominae
- Tribe: Strachiini
- Genus: Afrania; Stål, 1865

Synonyms
- Sala Walker, 1867

Genus of true bugs

External image
- Image at iNaturalist

Afrania is a genus of African shield-bugs in the subfamily Pentatominae and tribe Strachiini, erected by Carl Stål in 1865.

== Species ==
BioLib and the Global Biodiversity Information Facility include:

1. Afrania brachyptera (Schaum) Schaum (Afrania wahlbergi (Stål, 1853) has been synonymised with this species)
2. Afrania exigua (Walker, 1867)
