= Murgantia violascens =

Scientific classification
- Domain: Eukaryota
- Kingdom: Animalia
- Phylum: Arthropoda
- Class: Insecta
- Order: Hemiptera
- Suborder: Heteroptera
- Family: Pentatomidae
- Genus: Murgantia
- Species: M. violascens

Binomial name
- Murgantia violascens (Westwood, 1837)

Species of true bug

Murgantia violascens is a species of stink bug in the family Pentatomidae. It is found in the Caribbean Sea, North America, and South America.
