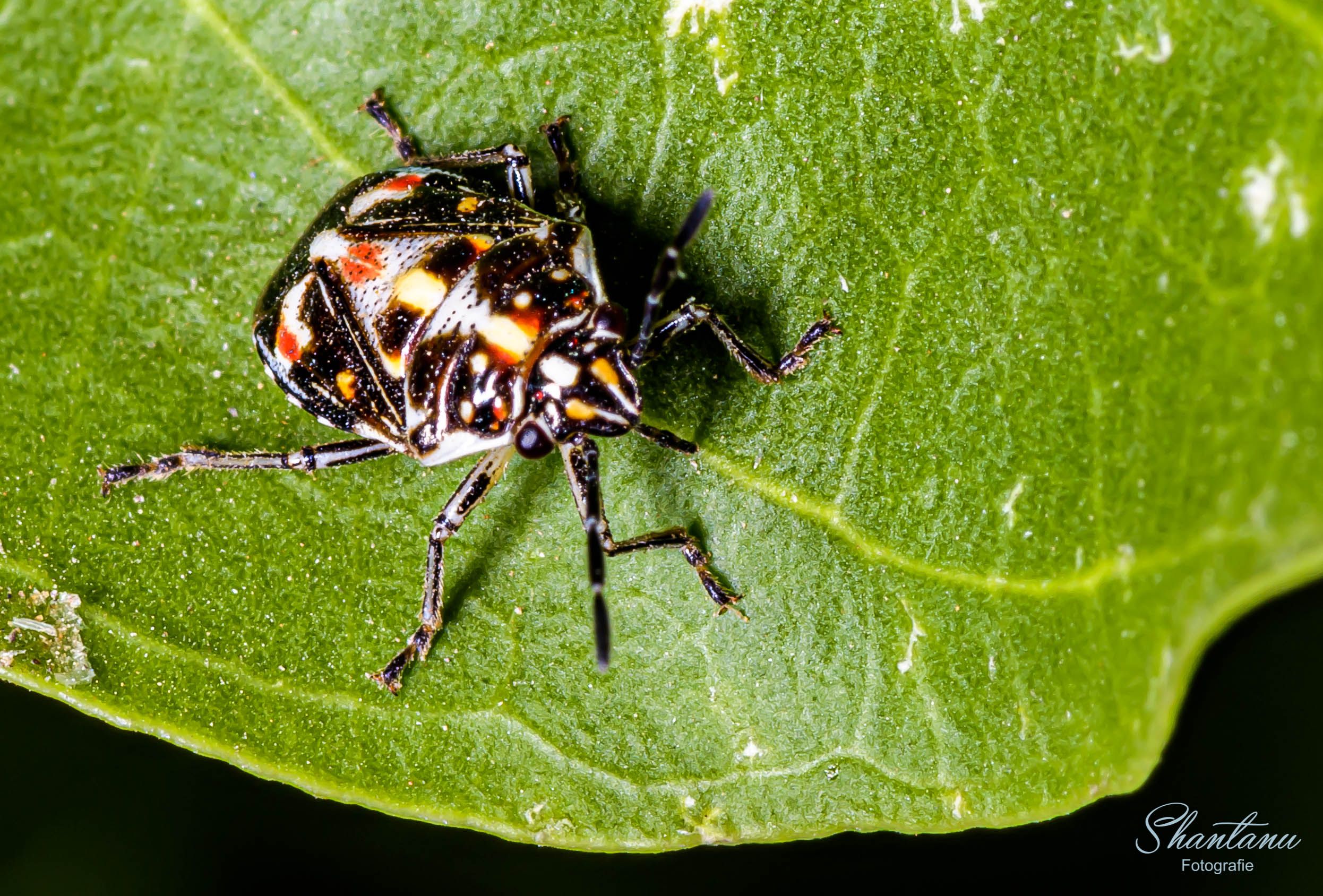
- Stenozygum speciosum

Scientific classification
- Domain: Eukaryota
- Kingdom: Animalia
- Phylum: Arthropoda
- Class: Insecta
- Order: Hemiptera
- Suborder: Heteroptera
- Family: Pentatomidae
- Subfamily: Pentatominae
- Tribe: Strachiini; Mulsant & Rey, 1866

= Strachiini =

Tribe of insects

Strachiini is a tribe of shield bugs in the subfamily Pentatominae.

== Genera ==
BioLib includes:

1. Afrania Stål, 1865
2. Afraniella Schouteden, 1904
3. Bagrada Stål, 1862
4. Capnoda Jakovlev, 1887
5. Compsoprepes Stål, 1867
6. Eurydema Laporte de Castelnau, 1833
7. Grossiana Ahmad & Khan, 1980
8. Madates Strand, 1910
9. Murgantia Stål, 1862
10. Pylophora Van Duzee, 1923
11. Seansonius Rider, 1998
12. Stenozygum Fieber, 1861
13. Strachia Hahn, 1831
14. Trochiscocoris Reuter, 1890
