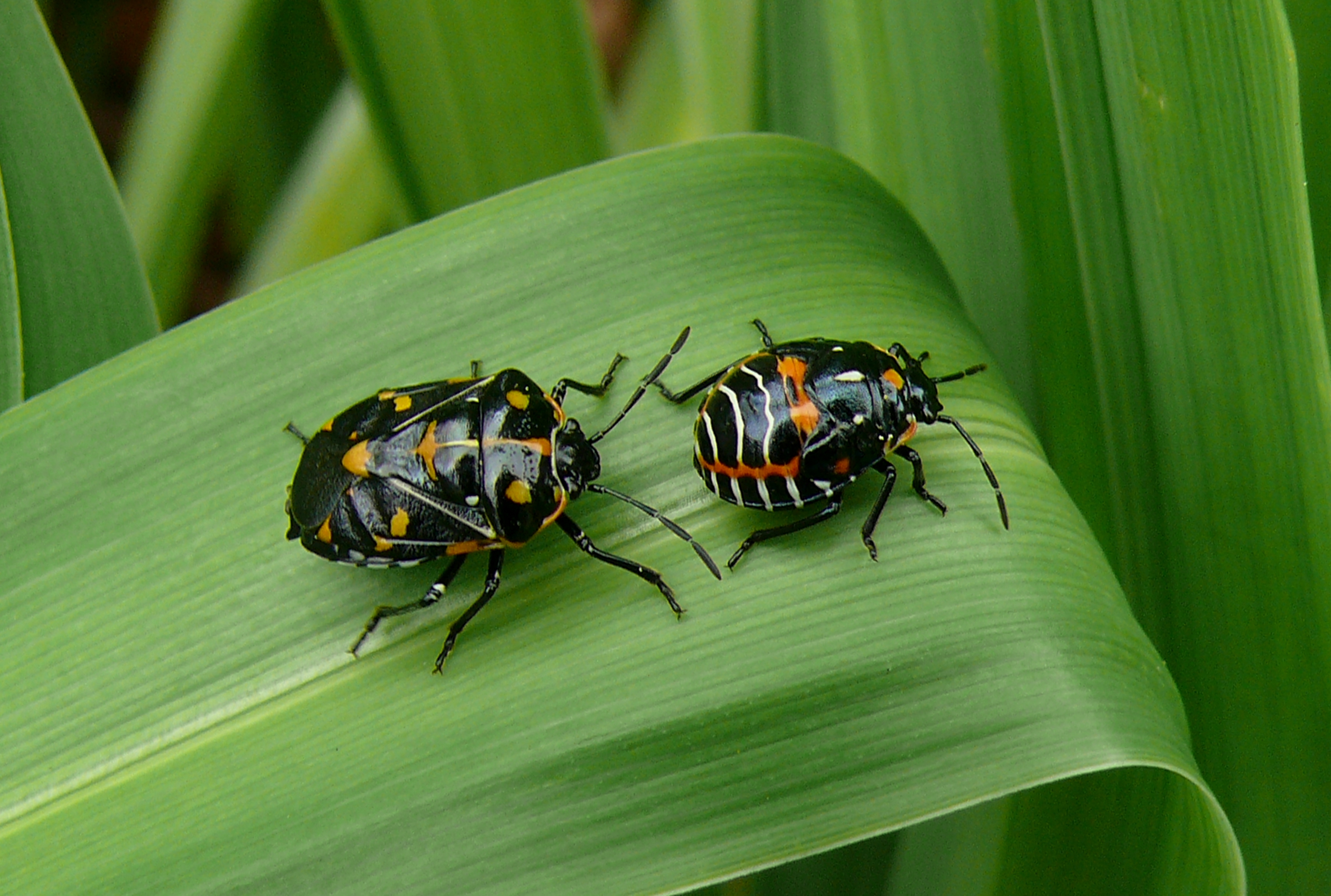
- Adult (left) and nymph (right)

Scientific classification
- Kingdom: Animalia
- Phylum: Arthropoda
- Clade: Pancrustacea
- Class: Insecta
- Order: Hemiptera
- Suborder: Heteroptera
- Family: Pentatomidae
- Genus: Murgantia
- Species: M. histrionica

Binomial name
- Murgantia histrionica (Hahn, 1834)

= Harlequin cabbage bug =

Species of true bug

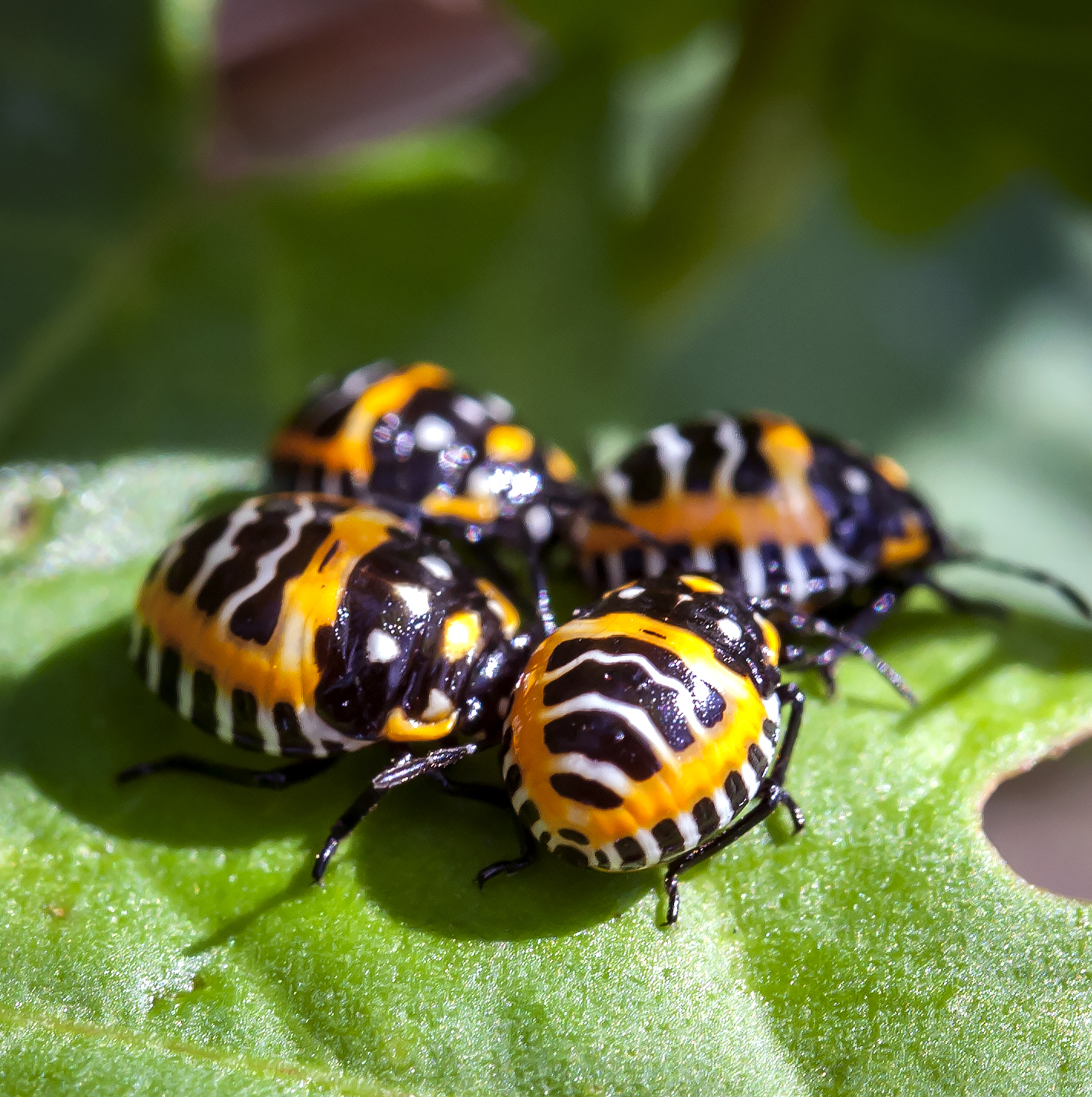
Aggregated nymphs

The harlequin cabbage bug (Murgantia histrionica), also known as calico bug, fire bug or harlequin bug, is a black stinkbug of the family Pentatomidae, marked with red, orange, yellow and white markings. It is a major pest of cabbage and related crops in the Brassicaceae, as well as the ornamental flower cleome throughout tropical and North America, especially the warmer parts of the United States. Nymphs are active during the summer and in the tropics the bug can achieve three to six generations a year. In the northern range there is only one generation annually and the insects overwinter as adults in crop residues or field edges. Organic control involves hand-picking the insects off the plants (they can be dropped into soapy water to drown them) and being especially careful to remove and destroy all the eggs, which are black-and-white striped, laid in clutches of twelve.

== Feeding and chemical defense ==
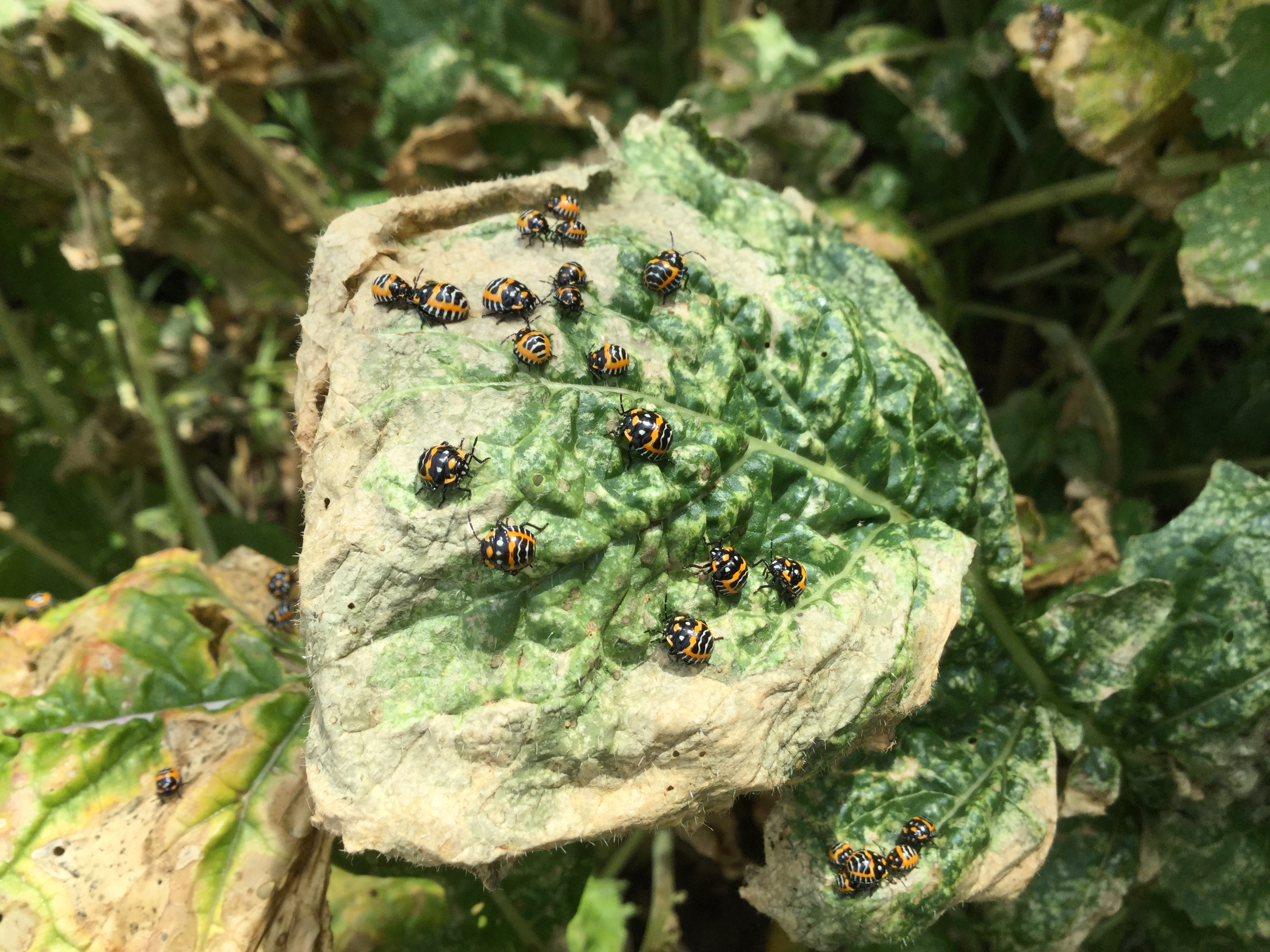
Young insects slowly destroying a turnip crop

Harlequin bugs are phytophagous insects. Adults and nymphs feed on the stems and leaves of plants such as cabbage, broccoli, kale, turnip, radish, horseradish, mustard and rapeseed, and often cause blotching by their piercing-sucking feeding. These plants are economically important and are abundant in crop fields but when they are not in production, harlequin bugs are able to feed on wild plants as well.

Cruciferous plants such as cabbage produce mustard oil glycosides which give them a stinging flavor. This chemical compound is sequestered by harlequin bugs and stored in the prothorax as they feed. The adult bugs have been shown to be unpalatable to some species of birds thanks to this chemical defense, which could explain their warning coloration. As glucosinolates are often used by crucifers to reduce insect herbivory, their sequestration could also reduce attack rates by insect predators.

== Circulation ==
Like all insects, harlequin bugs have an open circulatory system. Blood is pumped to the head (anteriorly) through the dorsal blood vessel and posteriorly through the ventral body cavity. To map out the circulation of blood in these insects, Craig et al. injected radioactive phosphorus into the posterior end of the heart and traced it through the body cavity. The blood reached the wings first, then the antennae, and then pairs of legs in order from anterior to posterior. Craig et al. also tested the time it takes for blood to form a homogeneous mixture (complete mixing). The time it took for blood to completely mix in harlequin bugs was about twenty-five minutes.

== Mating ==
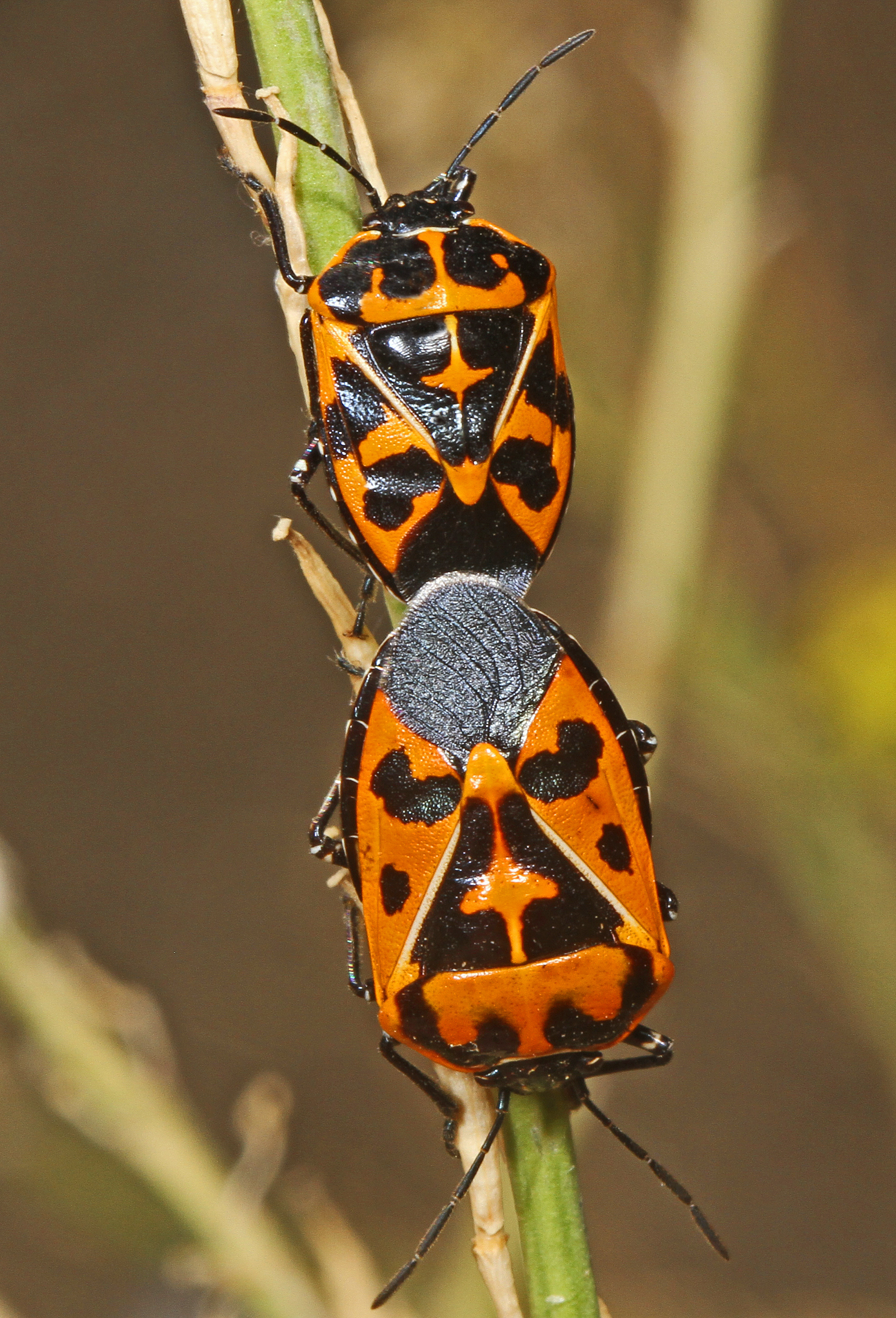
Mating pair

Harlequin bugs reproduce rapidly and females mate multiple times with many males before laying up to 149 eggs per female.

Mating in harlequin bugs is similar to other insects in that the male transfers sperm to the female and the female stores this sperm in a specialized structure called the spermatheca. Using electron microscopy, Stacconi et al. were able to study the structure of the spermatheca in detail (2011).

A saccular dilation in the spermatheca stores spermatozoa received from males during copulation. It can maximize efficiency and use of sperm. Derived from the ectoderm, the spermatheca is covered in fat and tissue and has three main regions: the distal region, the medial region and the proximal region. The coiled distal region is responsible for the control of sperm flow. It can modulate how much sperm is excreted which ensures that the female does not lose an excess of sperm. The proximal region contains valves which prevent the backflow of sperm when muscles dilate. This region is connected to the spermathecal duct where sperm exits. Stacconi and Romani (2011) found that, overall, the saccular structure within the spermatheca plays a key role in identifying mated and unmated females. Males are able to identify a mated versus unmated female by the volume of the saccular gland. The study also shows that parasitoid insects are able to identify mated and unmated females.

Female mate choice is based heavily on host plants because male size and coloration, which is important in mating, is determined by the type of host plant they were reared on. During mating, females also prefer males which have similar odor cues to the host plant of the female. Females of M. histrionica oviposit on specific plants that are able to provide better nutrition and habitat for their offspring. One study done by Hemley-Hartman and Miller (2014) studied the effects of host plants on female oviposition site choice. The researchers used broccoli and mustard as two different host plants and found that individuals reared on broccoli were more likely to mate in general and all individuals reared on mustard mated. Individuals reared on mustard were larger than individuals reared on broccoli. Also, the distinctive orange color of M. histrionica which plays a role in mate choice, was not affected by host plants. This study shows that M. histrionica have variation in mate choice depending on changing seasons because the availability of these commercial plants also changes with season.

== Migration ==
It is important for M. histrionica to migrate from plant to plant depending on seasonal and insect density changes. In a study conducted by Englishloeb and Collier (1987), insects released from the original bush had different migration preferences depending on their sex. Males tended to migrate to short distances from the original plant and females mostly remained on the original plant. The results of this study were appropriate because males are more inclined to find mates and reduce competition by migrating away from a dense area while females need to oviposit. Plants with higher flowering capability were more likely to house females for a long period of time because flowers and buds are able to provide more nourishment for nymphs.

== Pheromones and aggregation ==
M. histrionica males contain 10,11-epoxy-1-bisabolen-3-ol, a pheromone more commonly known as murgantinol. The stereoisomers of male harlequin bug pheromones consists of two compounds: tridecane and murgantinol. These substances, found specifically in male pheromones, are responsible for aggregation of the insects to aid in sexual reproduction and can also be used in warning predators. A study conducted by Zahn et al. (2008) found that mature male insects produced pheromones that recruited females, other males and young insects based on attractiveness. For females, the pheromone is used as a sex-pheromone to attract mates. Other males use a different version of this pheromone to aggregate more males to a given area to signal the availability of food and it serves a similar purpose with nymphs. Nymphs use the pheromone to guide themselves to the food source in starving conditions.

Pheromones can also be used to bait plants that are staples for M. histrionica and trap the insects. M. histrionica are major pests of plants in the family Brassicaceae. In a study conducted by Ludwig and Kok (2001), researchers tested broccoli, mustard and rape plants for attractiveness to the harlequin bug and found that these plants do not significantly delay development in the bugs. This is what leads to these economically important plants to be targeted by M. histrionica. The study showed that all plants, especially small and young plants even at lower densities of insects, experienced death after being targeted by harlequin bugs, although larger plants could bear more numbers.

== See also ==
- Dindymus versicolor, an Australian insect also known as the "harlequin bug"
