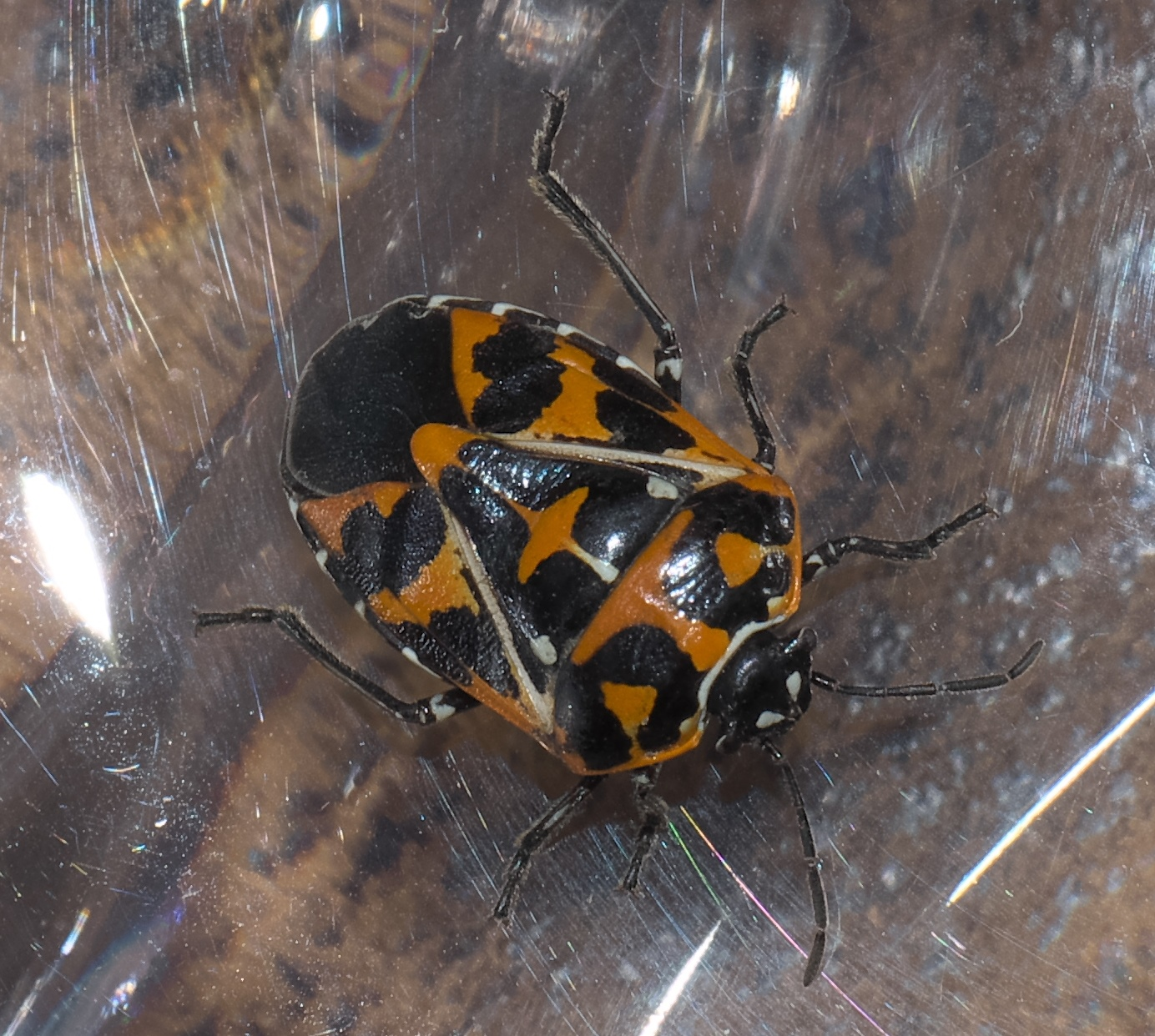
- Murgantia histrionica

Scientific classification
- Kingdom: Animalia
- Phylum: Arthropoda
- Clade: Pancrustacea
- Class: Insecta
- Order: Hemiptera
- Suborder: Heteroptera
- Family: Pentatomidae
- Tribe: Strachiini
- Genus: Murgantia; Stål, 1862

= Murgantia (bug) =

Genus of true bugs

Murgantia is a genus of stink bugs in the family Pentatomidae. There are at least 12 described species in Murgantia.

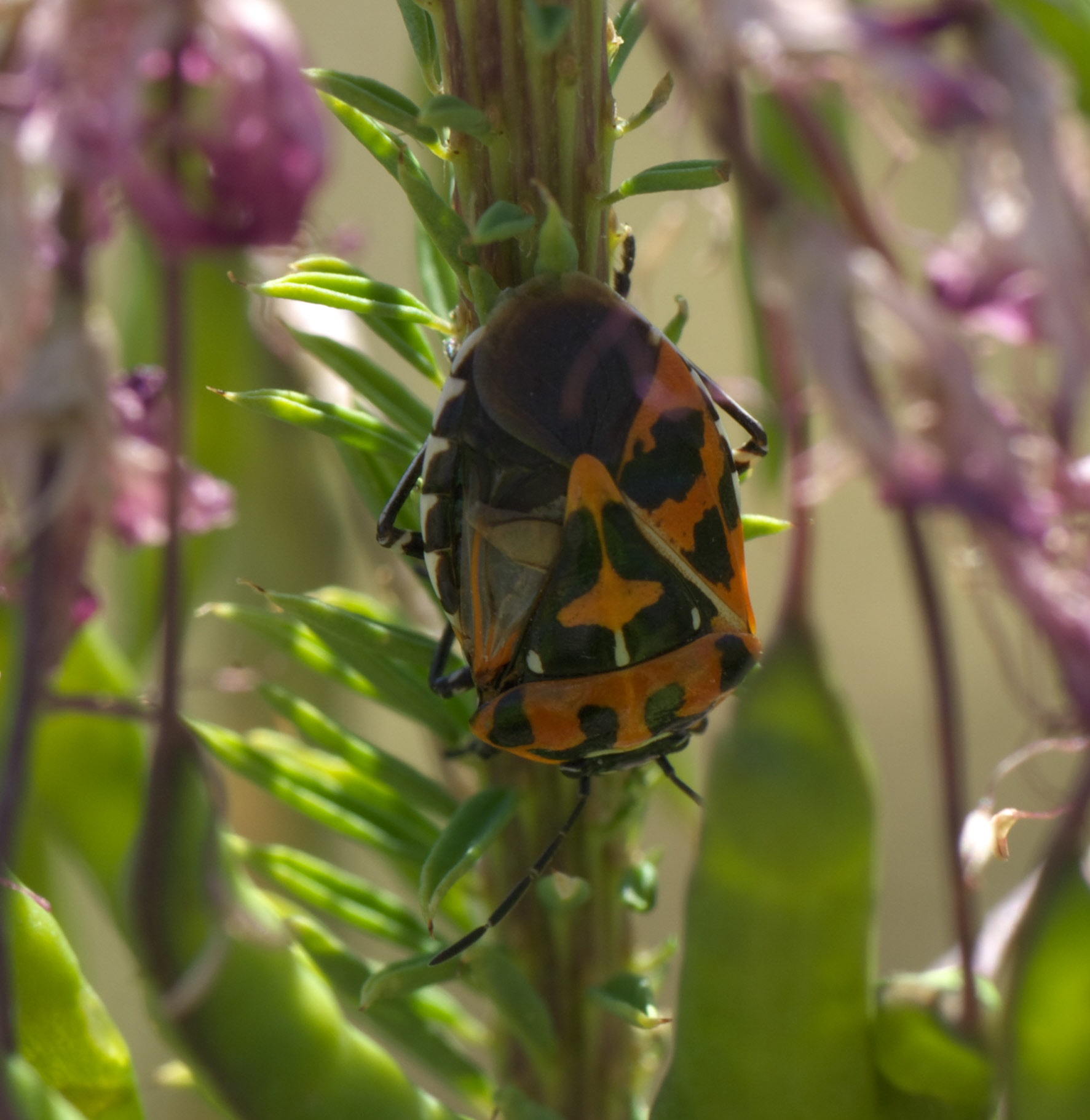
Murgantia histrionica

== Species ==
These six species belong to the genus Murgantia:

- Murgantia angularis (Walker, 1867)^{i c g}
- Murgantia bifasciata Herrich-Schaeffer, 1836^{g}
- Murgantia histrionica (Hahn, 1834)^{i c g b} (harlequin bug)
- Murgantia tessellata (Amyot and Serville, 1843)^{i c g}
- Murgantia varicolor (Westwood, 1837)^{i c g}
- Murgantia violascens (Westwood, 1837)^{i c g b}

Data sources: i = ITIS, c = Catalogue of Life, g = GBIF, b = Bugguide.net
