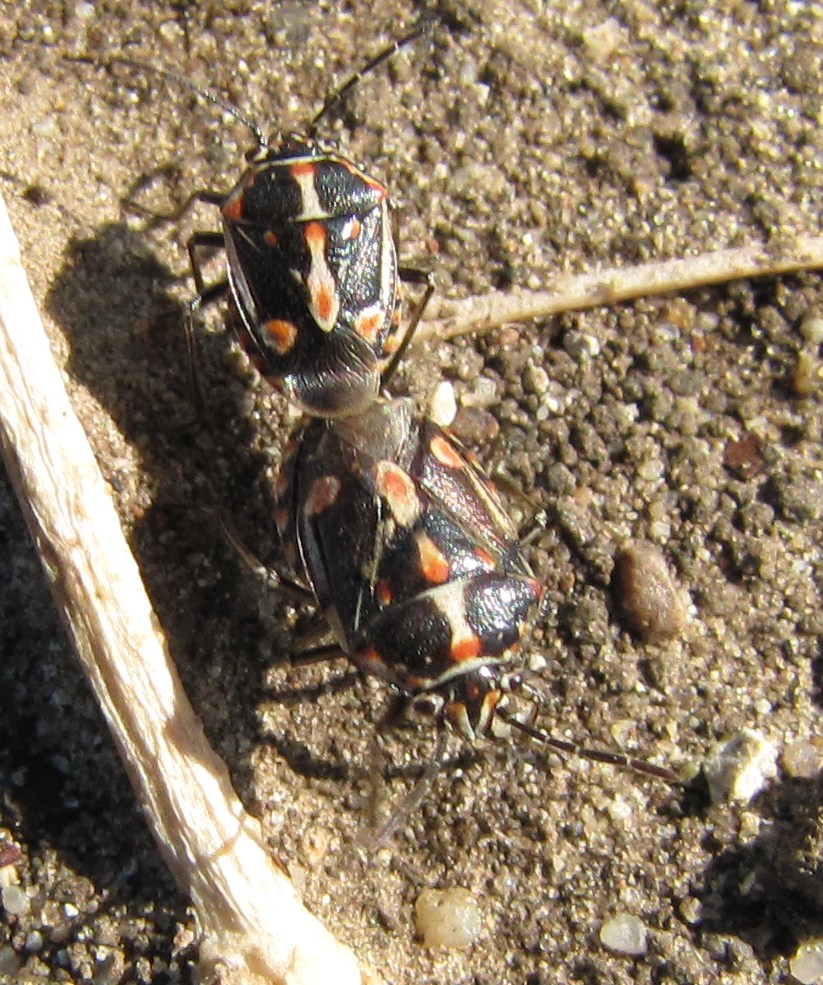
- Male and female Bagrada hilaris

Scientific classification
- Kingdom: Animalia
- Phylum: Arthropoda
- Clade: Pancrustacea
- Class: Insecta
- Order: Hemiptera
- Suborder: Heteroptera
- Superfamily: Pentatomoidea
- Family: Pentatomidae
- Subfamily: Pentatominae
- Tribe: Strachiini
- Genus: Bagrada; Stål, 1862

= Bagrada =

Genus of true bugs

Bagrada is a genus of stink bugs in the family Pentatomidae.

== Species ==
- Bagrada abeillei Puton, 1881
- Bagrada elegans Puton, 1873
- Bagrada funerea Horvath, 1901
- Bagrada hilaris (Burmeister, 1835) (Bagrada bug)
- Bagrada qinlingensis Zheng, 1982
- Bagrada stolida (Herrich-Schaeffer, 1839)
- Bagrada turcica Horvath, 1936
