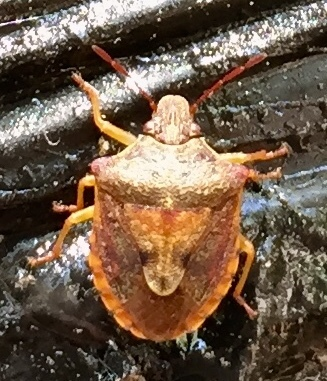

Scientific classification
- Kingdom: Animalia
- Phylum: Arthropoda
- Class: Insecta
- Order: Hemiptera
- Suborder: Heteroptera
- Family: Pentatomidae
- Tribe: Procleticini
- Genus: Dendrocoris
- Species: D. humeralis

Binomial name
- Dendrocoris humeralis (Uhler, 1877)

Synonyms
- Liotropis humeralis Uhler, 1877

= Dendrocoris humeralis =

Species of true bug

Dendrocoris humeralis is a species of stink bug in the family Pentatomidae. It is found in North America.
