= Dendrocoris arizonensis =

Scientific classification
- Kingdom: Animalia
- Phylum: Arthropoda
- Class: Insecta
- Order: Hemiptera
- Suborder: Heteroptera
- Family: Pentatomidae
- Tribe: Procleticini
- Genus: Dendrocoris
- Species: D. arizonensis

Binomial name
- Dendrocoris arizonensis Barber, 1911

Species of true bug

Dendrocoris arizonensis is a species of stink bug in the family Pentatomidae. It is found in North America.
