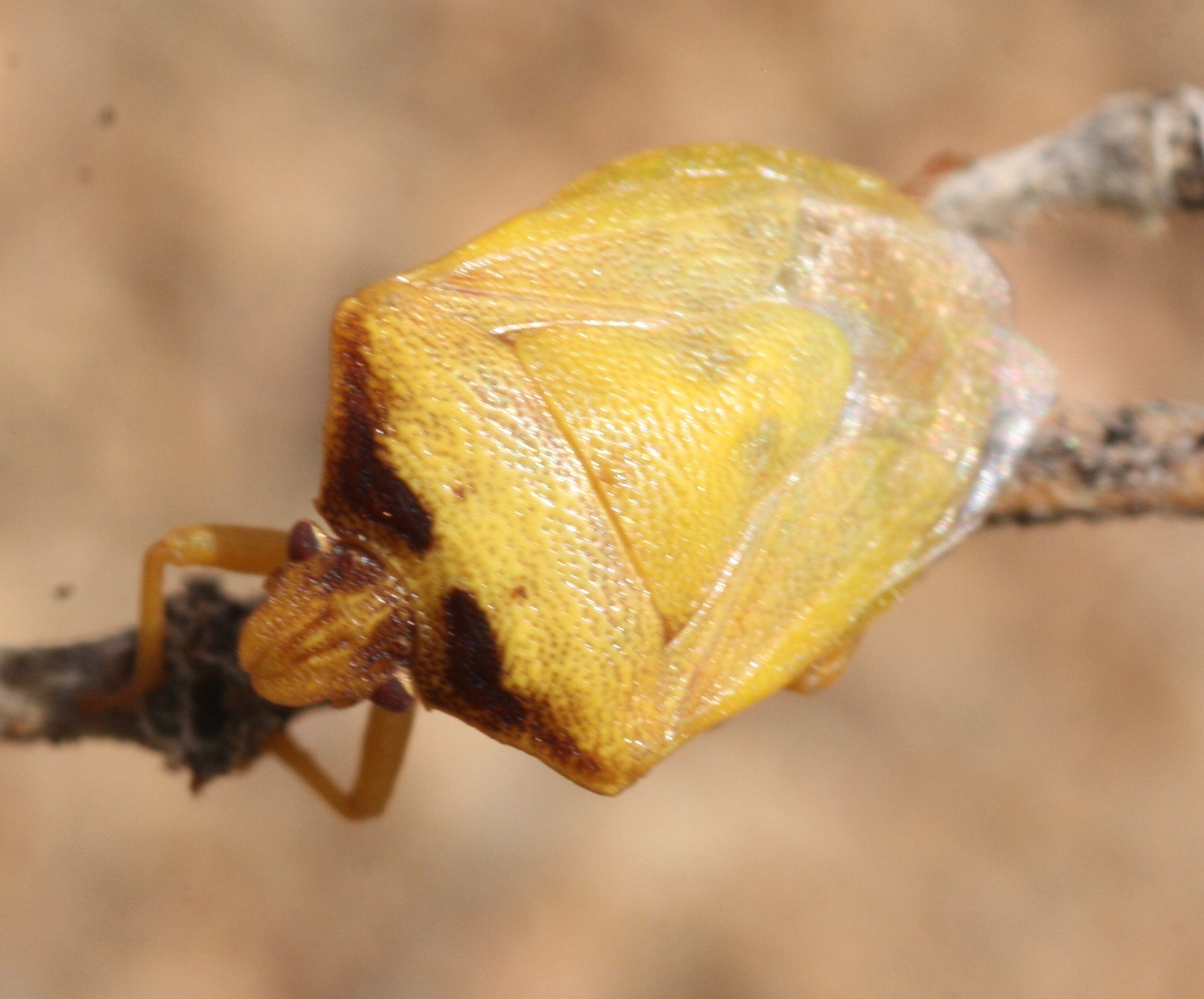
- Dendrocoris contaminatus

Scientific classification
- Kingdom: Animalia
- Phylum: Arthropoda
- Class: Insecta
- Order: Hemiptera
- Suborder: Heteroptera
- Family: Pentatomidae
- Subfamily: Pentatominae
- Tribe: Procleticini
- Genus: Dendrocoris; Bergroth, 1891

= Dendrocoris =

Genus of true bugs

Dendrocoris is a genus of stink bugs in the family Pentatomidae. There are about 11 described species in Dendrocoris.

== Species ==
These 11 species belong to the genus Dendrocoris:

- Dendrocoris arizonensis Barber, 1911
- Dendrocoris contaminatus Uhler, 1897
- Dendrocoris fruticicola Bergroth, 1891
- Dendrocoris humeralis (Uhler, 1877)
- Dendrocoris maculosus Thomas
- Dendrocoris nelsoni
- Dendrocoris neomexicanus
- Dendrocoris parapini Nelson, 1957
- Dendrocoris pini Montandon, 1893
- Dendrocoris reticulatus Barber, 1911
- Dendrocoris variegtus Nelson
