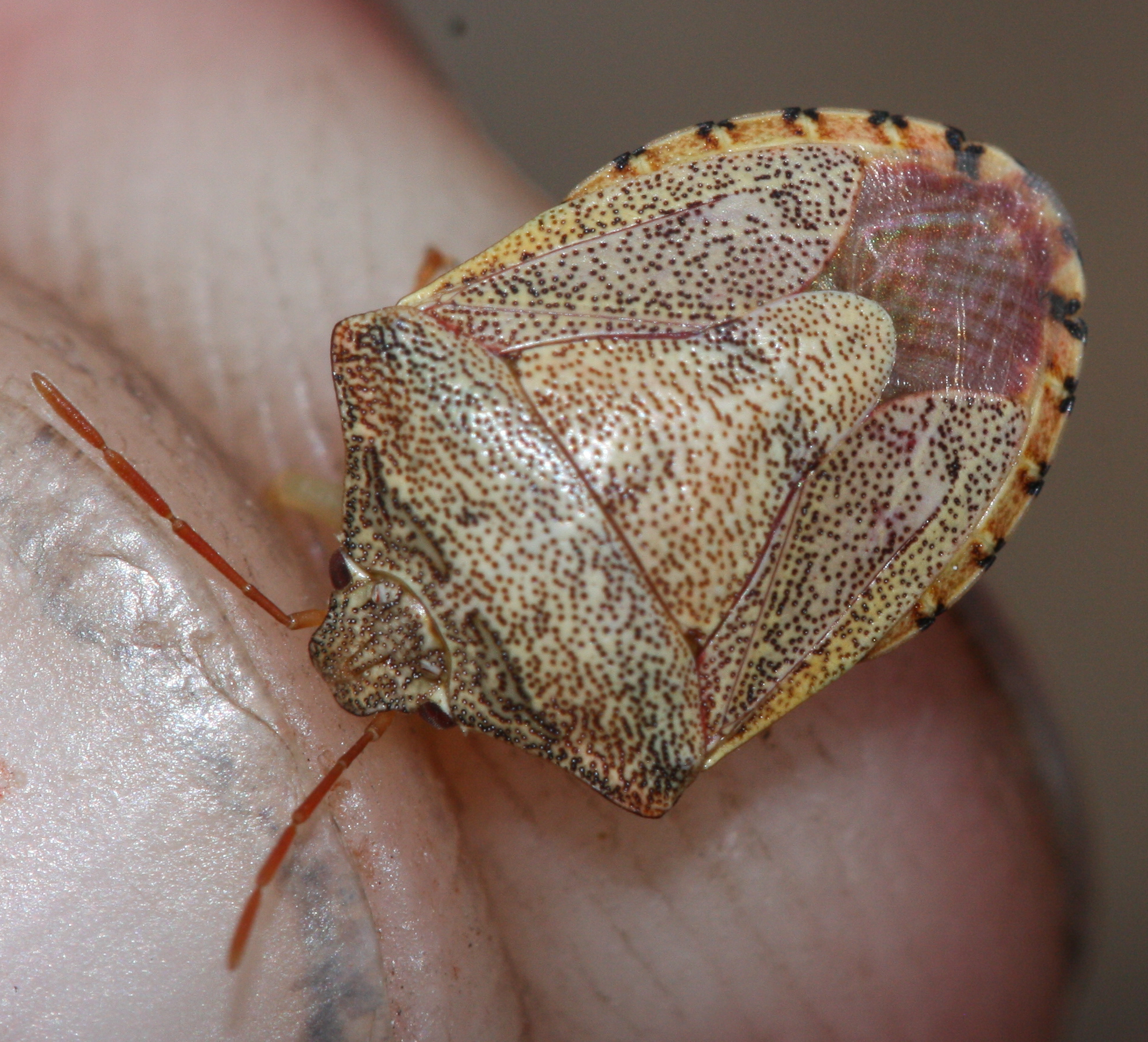

Scientific classification
- Kingdom: Animalia
- Phylum: Arthropoda
- Class: Insecta
- Order: Hemiptera
- Suborder: Heteroptera
- Family: Pentatomidae
- Tribe: Procleticini
- Genus: Dendrocoris
- Species: D. reticulatus

Binomial name
- Dendrocoris reticulatus Barber, 1911

= Dendrocoris reticulatus =

Species of true bug

Dendrocoris reticulatus is a species of stink bug in the family Pentatomidae. It is found in North America.
