= Rhynchocoris =

Scientific classification
- Kingdom: Animalia
- Phylum: Arthropoda
- Class: Insecta
- Order: Hemiptera
- Suborder: Heteroptera
- Family: Pentatomidae
- Subfamily: Pentatominae
- Tribe: Rhynchocorini
- Genus: Rhynchocoris; Westwood, 1837

Genus of true bugs

External image
- Insects of Hong Kong (citizen science): Rhynchocoris humeralis

Rhynchocoris is a genus of Asian shield bugs in the subfamily Pentatominae and typical of tribe Rhynchocorini, erected by John Westwood in 1837. Species are recorded from India, southern China, Indochina and Malesia.

== Species ==
BioLib includes:

1. Rhynchocoris humeralis (Thunberg, 1783) – type species (as Cimex hamatus Fabricius, 1787 = Cimex humeralis Thunberg, 1783: by subsequent designation)
2. Rhynchocoris nigridens Stål, 1871
3. Rhynchocoris plagiatus (Walker, 1867)
