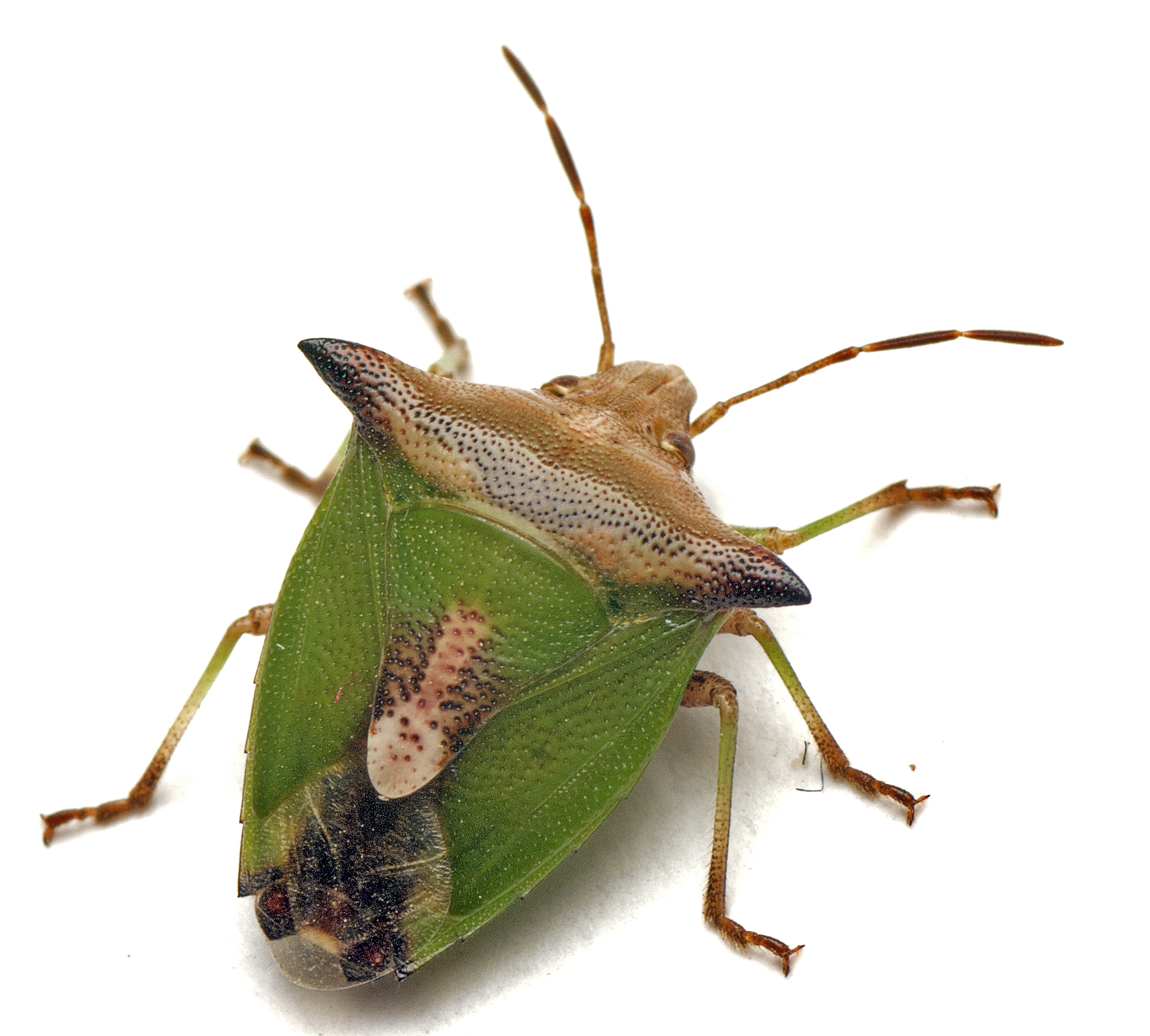
- Cuspicona strenuella

Scientific classification
- Kingdom: Animalia
- Phylum: Arthropoda
- Clade: Pancrustacea
- Class: Insecta
- Order: Hemiptera
- Suborder: Heteroptera
- Family: Pentatomidae
- Subfamily: Pentatominae
- Tribe: Rhynchocorini; Stål, 1871

Synonyms
- Rhynchocorina Stål, 1871

= Rhynchocorini =

Tribe of true bugs

The Rhynchocorini are a tribe of shield bugs in the subfamily Pentatominae, erected by Carl Stål in 1870. Sometimes called "spined shield bugs", the genera in this tribe are distributed from India, China, South-East Asia, through to the Pacific islands; some genera are endemic to Australia and New Zealand.

== Genera ==
BioLib includes:

1. Araducta Walker, 1867
2. Avicenna Distant, 1901
3. Biprorulus Breddin, 1900
4. Cuspicona Dallas, 1851
5. Diaphyta Bergroth, 1891
6. Everardia Gross, 1975
7. Hoffmanseggiella Spinola, 1850
8. Koogobatha Distant, 1910
9. Morna Stål, 1867: monotypic Morna florens (Walker, 1867)
10. Mygoodano Distant, 1910
11. Ocirrhoe Stål, 1876
12. Parocirrhoe Gross, 1975
13. Pegala Stål, 1867
14. Petalaspis Bergroth, 1916
15. Pugione Stål, 1867
16. Rhynchocoris Westwood, 1837 - type genus
17. Utana Distant, 1900
18. Vitellus Stål, 1865
