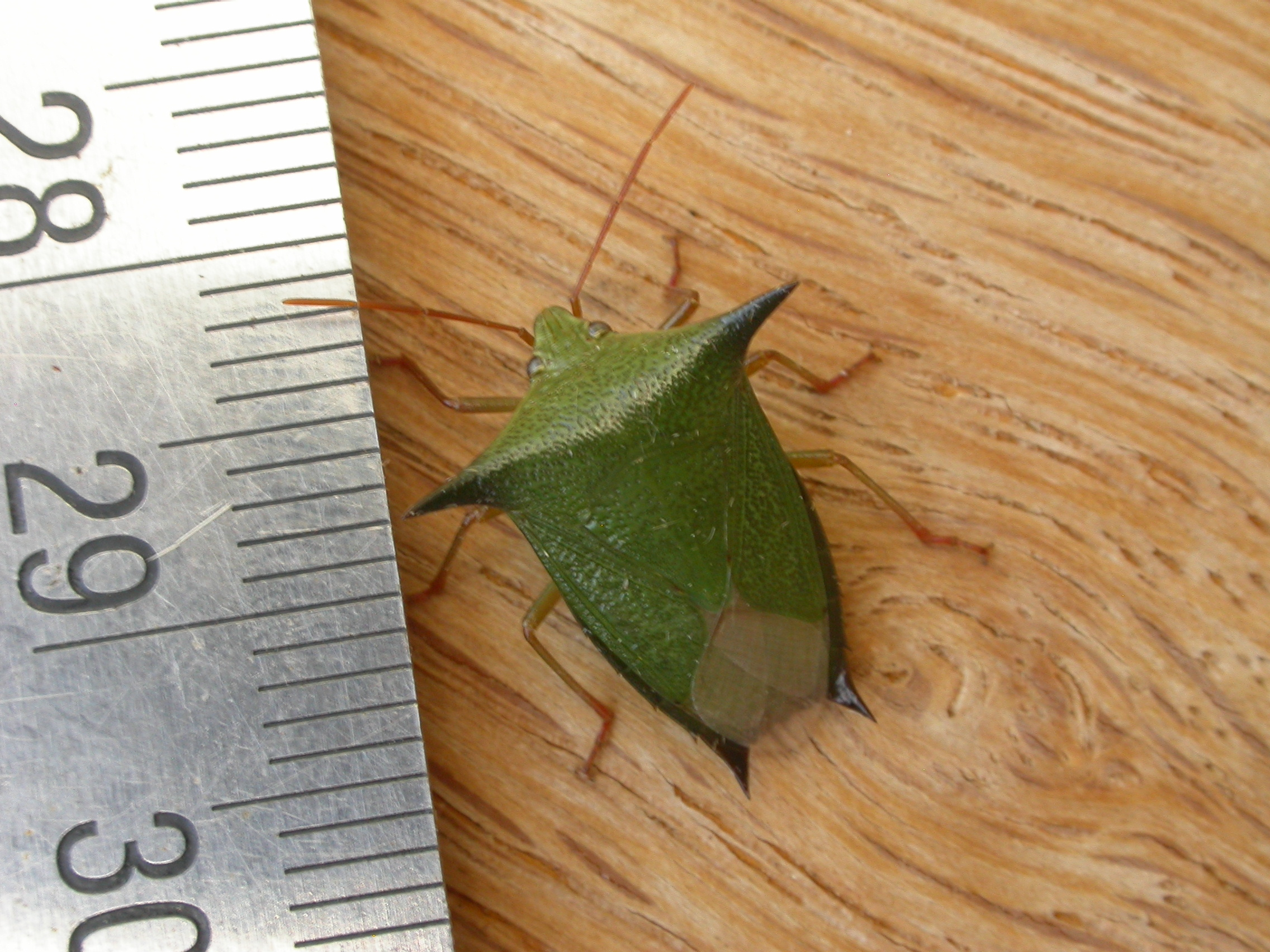
- Vitellus rufolineus

Scientific classification
- Kingdom: Animalia
- Phylum: Arthropoda
- Clade: Pancrustacea
- Class: Insecta
- Order: Hemiptera
- Suborder: Heteroptera
- Family: Pentatomidae
- Subfamily: Pentatominae
- Tribe: Rhynchocorini
- Genus: Vitellus; Stål, 1865

= Vitellus =

Genus of true bugs

Vitellus is a genus of Asian bugs in the subfamily Pentatominae and tribe Rhynchocorini, erected by Carl Stål in 1865.

== Species ==
BioLib includes:

1. Vitellus antemna Breddin, 1900
2. Vitellus forficuloides (Walker, 1867)
3. Vitellus insularis Stål, 1865 - type species
4. Vitellus mucronatus Stål, 1865
5. Vitellus orientalis Distant, 1900
6. Vitellus rufispinus Jensen-Haarup, 1937
7. Vitellus rufolineus (Walker, 1867)
8. Vitellus simpsoni Gross & McDonald, 1994
9. Vitellus warreni Gross & McDonald, 1994
