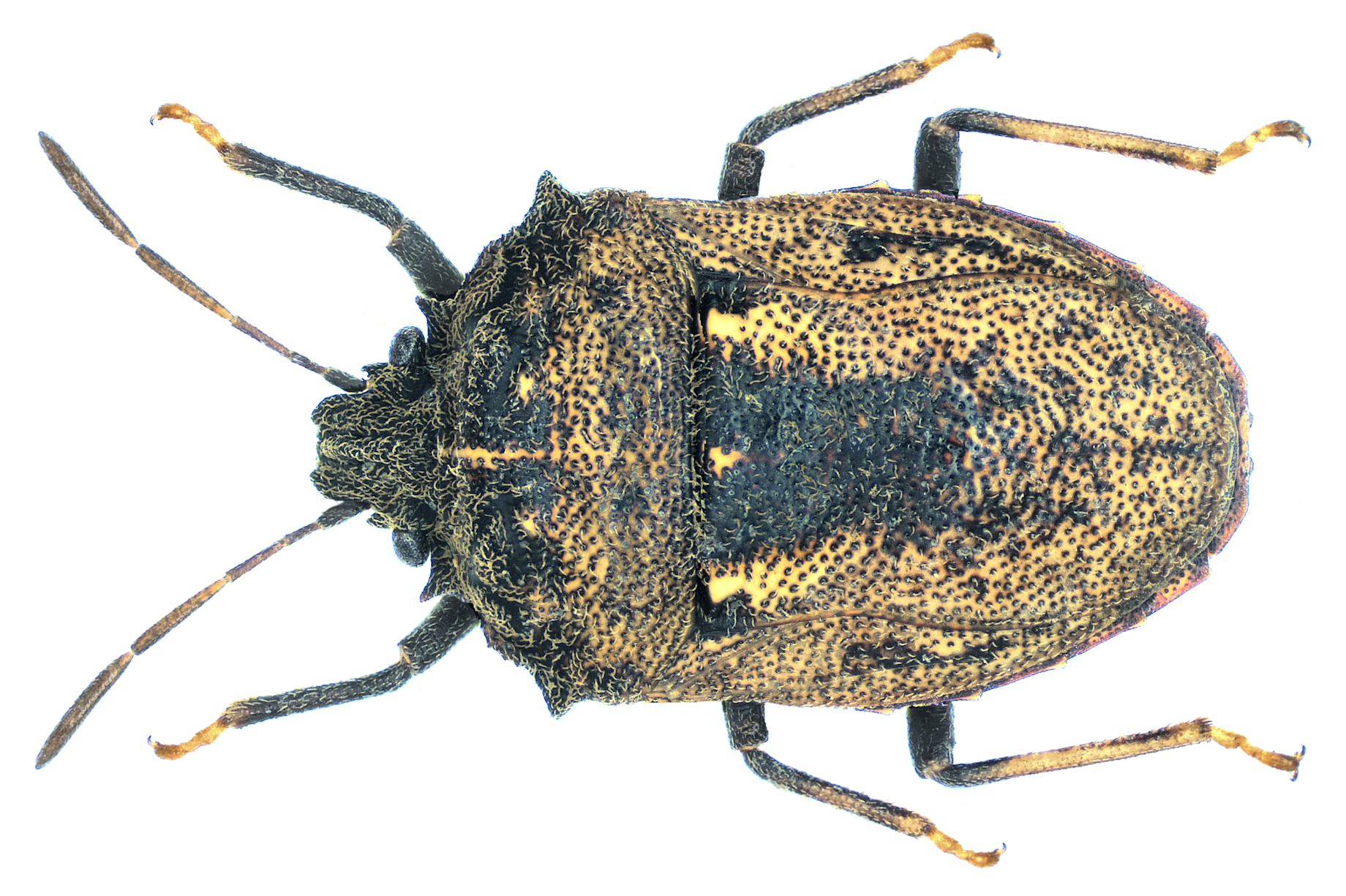
- Scotinophara coarctata

Scientific classification
- Kingdom: Animalia
- Phylum: Arthropoda
- Clade: Pancrustacea
- Class: Insecta
- Order: Hemiptera
- Suborder: Heteroptera
- Family: Pentatomidae
- Subfamily: Podopinae
- Tribe: Podopini
- Genus: Scotinophara; Stål, 1867

= Scotinophara =

Genus of true bugs

Scotinophara is a genus of shield bugs in the tribe Podopini, sometimes called "black bugs". Species have a widespread distribution in Europe, Africa, Asia and Australia. At least three species: the common black bug (S. coarctata), Malayan black bug (S. lurida), and the Japanese rice black bug (S. latiuscula) are significant rice pests.

== Species ==
BioLib lists the following:

1. Scotinophara acutangula Linnavuori, 1973
2. Scotinophara affinis Haglund, 1868
3. Scotinophara agusanortica Barrion, Joshi, Barrion-Dupo & Sebastian, 2007
4. Scotinophara alegria Barrion, Joshi, Barrion-Dupo & Sebastian, 2007
5. Scotinophara allanae Musgrave, 1930
6. Scotinophara arkwata Barrion, Joshi, Barrion-Dupo & Sebastian, 2007
7. Scotinophara bispinosa (Fabricius, 1798)
8. Scotinophara calligera Bergroth, 1893
9. Scotinophara ceylonica (Distant, 1901)
10. Scotinophara cinerea (Le Guillou, 1841)
11. Scotinophara coarctata (Fabricius, 1798)
12. Scotinophara cornuta Horváth, 1893
13. Scotinophara curvispina Schouteden, 1903
14. Scotinophara depressa Linnavuori, 1974
15. Scotinophara fibulata (Germar, 1839) - type species (as Podops fibulatus Germar)
16. Scotinophara horvathi Distant, 1883
17. Scotinophara ilonga Barrion, Joshi, Barrion-Dupo & Sebastian, 2007
18. Scotinophara inermiceps (Breddin, 1900)
19. Scotinophara inermis Haglund, 1868
20. Scotinophara kabangkalanensis Barrion, Joshi, Barrion-Dupo & Sebastian, 2007
21. Scotinophara kalinga Barrion, Joshi, Barrion-Dupo & Sebastian, 2007
22. Scotinophara lamottei Villiers, 1951
23. Scotinophara landangica Barrion, Joshi, Barrion-Dupo & Sebastian, 2007
24. Scotinophara latiuscula Breddin, 1900
25. Scotinophara limosa (Walker, 1867)
26. Scotinophara longicornis Linnavuori, 1982
27. Scotinophara longispina Schouteden, 1905
28. Scotinophara lurida (Burmeister, 1834)
29. Scotinophara lutheri Bergroth, 1914
30. Scotinophara luzonica Barrion, Joshi, Barrion-Dupo & Sebastian, 2007
31. Scotinophara madagascariensis Schouteden, 1903
32. Scotinophara maguindanaoana Barrion, Joshi, Barrion-Dupo & Sebastian, 2007
33. Scotinophara malayensis (Distant, 1903)
34. Scotinophara midsayapensis Barrion, Joshi, Barrion-Dupo & Sebastian, 2007
35. Scotinophara minor Ruckes, 1963
36. Scotinophara mixta Linnavuori, 1970
37. Scotinophara mlanga Barrion, Joshi, Barrion-Dupo & Sebastian, 2007
38. Scotinophara molavica Barrion, Joshi, Barrion-Dupo & Sebastian, 2007
39. Scotinophara montana Villiers, 1951
40. Scotinophara nigra (Dallas, 1851)
41. Scotinophara obscura (Dallas, 1851)
42. Scotinophara ochracea (Distant, 1901)
43. Scotinophara parva Yang, 1934
44. Scotinophara pirurotonga Barrion, Joshi, Barrion-Dupo & Sebastian, 2007
45. Scotinophara pseudoserrata Barrion, Joshi, Barrion-Dupo & Sebastian, 2007
46. Scotinophara putikanica Barrion, Joshi, Barrion-Dupo & Sebastian, 2007
47. Scotinophara scobinae (Distant, 1908)
48. Scotinophara scottii Horváth, 1879
49. Scotinophara scutellata Scott, 1880
50. Scotinophara serrata (Vollenhoven, 1863)
51. Scotinophara sicula (A. Costa, 1841)
52. Scotinophara sororcula (Breddin, 1900)
53. Scotinophara sorsogonensis Barrion, Joshi, Barrion-Dupo & Sebastian, 2007
54. Scotinophara subalpina Bergroth, 1893
55. Scotinophara sumatrensis Wongsiri, 1975
56. Scotinophara tantanganica Barrion, Joshi, Barrion-Dupo & Sebastian, 2007
57. Scotinophara tarsalis (Vollenhoven, 1863)
58. Scotinophara tibialis (Signoret, 1861)
59. Scotinophara trifurcata Barrion, Joshi, Barrion-Dupo & Sebastian, 2007
60. Scotinophara westwoodi Bergroth, 1915
61. Scotinophara yaoundea Linnavuori, 1982
62. Scotinophara zamboanga Barrion, Joshi, Barrion-Dupo & Sebastian, 2007
