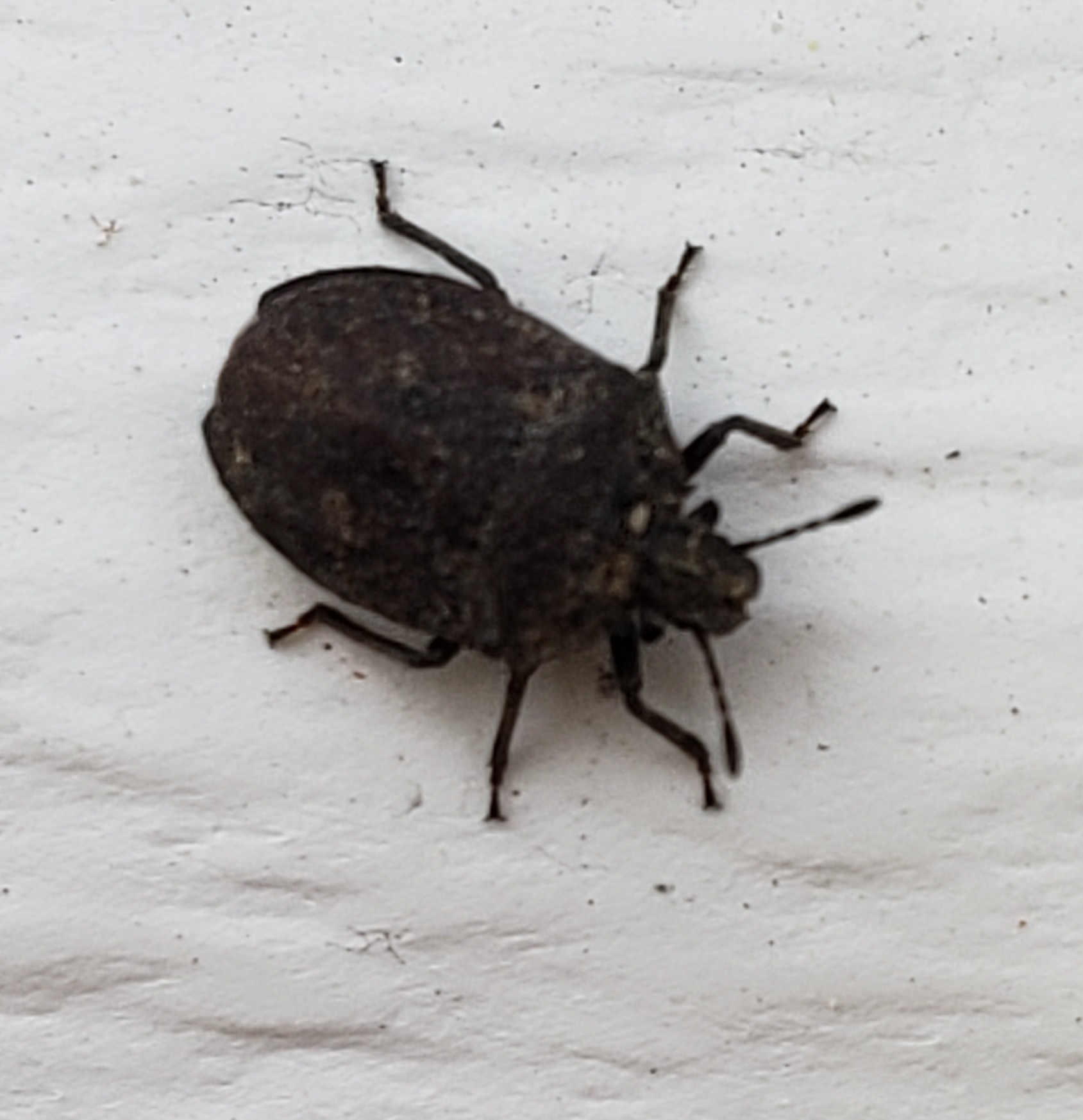

Scientific classification
- Domain: Eukaryota
- Kingdom: Animalia
- Phylum: Arthropoda
- Class: Insecta
- Order: Hemiptera
- Suborder: Heteroptera
- Family: Pentatomidae
- Genus: Amaurochrous
- Species: A. brevitylus

Binomial name
- Amaurochrous brevitylus Barber & Sailer, 1953

= Amaurochrous brevitylus =

Species of true bug

Amaurochrous brevitylus is a species of turtle bug in the family Pentatomidae. It is found in North America.
