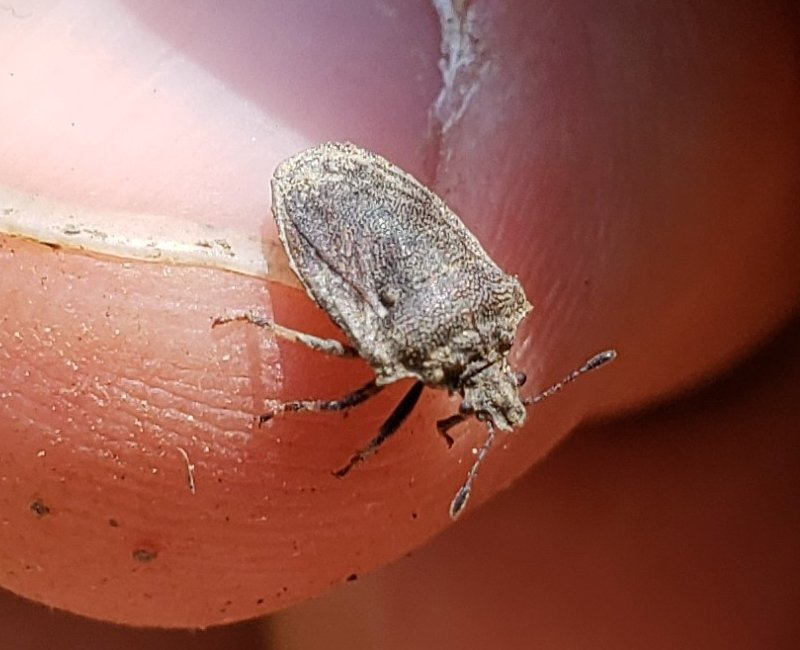

Scientific classification
- Kingdom: Animalia
- Phylum: Arthropoda
- Clade: Pancrustacea
- Class: Insecta
- Order: Hemiptera
- Suborder: Heteroptera
- Superfamily: Pentatomoidea
- Family: Pentatomidae
- Subfamily: Podopinae
- Tribe: Podopini
- Genus: Amaurochrous; Stål, 1872

= Amaurochrous =

Genus of true bugs

Amaurochrous is a genus of turtle bugs in the family Pentatomidae. There are about six described species in Amaurochrous.

== Species ==
These six species belong to the genus Amaurochrous:

- Amaurochrous brevitylus Barber & Sailer, 1953
- Amaurochrous cinctipes (Say, 1828)
- Amaurochrous dubius (Palisot, 1805)
- Amaurochrous magnus Barber & Sailer, 1953
- Amaurochrous ovalis Barber & Sailer, 1953
- Amaurochrous vanduzeei Barber & Sailer, 1953
