= Weda (bug) =

Scientific classification
- Domain: Eukaryota
- Kingdom: Animalia
- Phylum: Arthropoda
- Class: Insecta
- Order: Hemiptera
- Suborder: Heteroptera
- Family: Pentatomidae
- Tribe: Podopini
- Genus: Weda; Schouteden, 1905

Genus of true bugs

Weda is a genus of turtle bugs in the family Pentatomidae. There are at least three described species in Weda.

== Species ==
- Weda parvula (Van Duzee, 1904)
- Weda stylata Barber and Sailer, 1953
- Weda tumidifrons Barber and Sailer, 1953
