= Sciocoris longifrons =

Scientific classification
- Domain: Eukaryota
- Kingdom: Animalia
- Phylum: Arthropoda
- Class: Insecta
- Order: Hemiptera
- Suborder: Heteroptera
- Family: Pentatomidae
- Genus: Sciocoris
- Species: S. longifrons

Binomial name
- Sciocoris longifrons Barber, 1933

Species of true bug

Sciocoris longifrons is a species of stink bug in the family Pentatomidae. It is found in North America.
