= Dybowskia =

Dybowskia has been cited as synonyms for:

- the genus of grasses Hyparrhenia
- Dybowskyia Jakovlev, 1876: a genus of shield bugs in the tribe Tarisini
- Dybowskiella Waagen & Wentzel, 1886: an extinct genus of bryozoan in the family Fistuliporidae (Class Stenolaemata)
