= Crollius =

Scientific classification
- Domain: Eukaryota
- Kingdom: Animalia
- Phylum: Arthropoda
- Class: Insecta
- Order: Hemiptera
- Suborder: Heteroptera
- Family: Pentatomidae
- Tribe: Podopini
- Genus: Crollius; Distant,1901

Genus of shield bugs

Crollius is a genus of shield bugs in the tribe Podopini.
