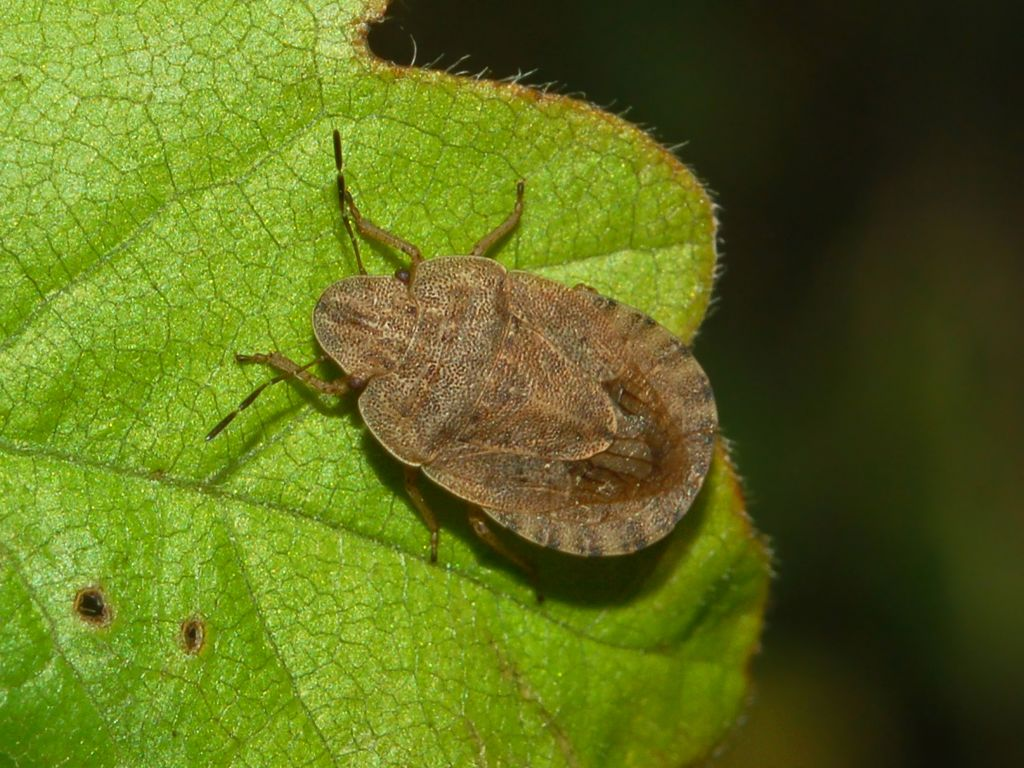

Scientific classification
- Kingdom: Animalia
- Phylum: Arthropoda
- Class: Insecta
- Order: Hemiptera
- Suborder: Heteroptera
- Family: Pentatomidae
- Genus: Sciocoris
- Species: S. homalonotus

Binomial name
- Sciocoris homalonotus Fieber, 1851

= Sciocoris homalonotus =

Species of true bug

Sciocoris homalonotus is a species of shield bug belonging to the family Pentatomidae, subfamily Pentatominae. It is approximately 6–7 mm in size. The species was first described by Franz Xaver Fieber in 1851.

The apex of the chorion is more rounded in respect of Sciocoris microphthalmus Flor, 1860.

It can be found in most of Europe.
