= Oncozygia =

Scientific classification
- Kingdom: Animalia
- Phylum: Arthropoda
- Clade: Pancrustacea
- Class: Insecta
- Order: Hemiptera
- Suborder: Heteroptera
- Family: Pentatomidae
- Subfamily: Podopinae
- Tribe: Podopini
- Genus: Oncozygia; Stål, 1872
- Species: O. clavicornis

Binomial name
- Oncozygia clavicornis Stål, 1872

Genus of true bugs

Oncozygia is a genus of shield bugs in the family Pentatomidae. There is one described species in Oncozygia: Oncozygia clavicornis.
