= Burrus =

Scientific classification
- Kingdom: Animalia
- Phylum: Arthropoda
- Class: Insecta
- Order: Hemiptera
- Suborder: Heteroptera
- Family: Pentatomidae
- Tribe: Podopini
- Genus: Burrus; Distant, 1908

Genus of shield bugs

Burrus is a genus of shield bugs in the tribe Podopini.
