= Amaurochrous cinctipes =

Scientific classification
- Domain: Eukaryota
- Kingdom: Animalia
- Phylum: Arthropoda
- Class: Insecta
- Order: Hemiptera
- Suborder: Heteroptera
- Family: Pentatomidae
- Genus: Amaurochrous
- Species: A. cinctipes

Binomial name
- Amaurochrous cinctipes (Say, 1828)

Species of true bug

Amaurochrous cinctipes is a species of turtle bug in the family Pentatomidae. It is found in North America.
