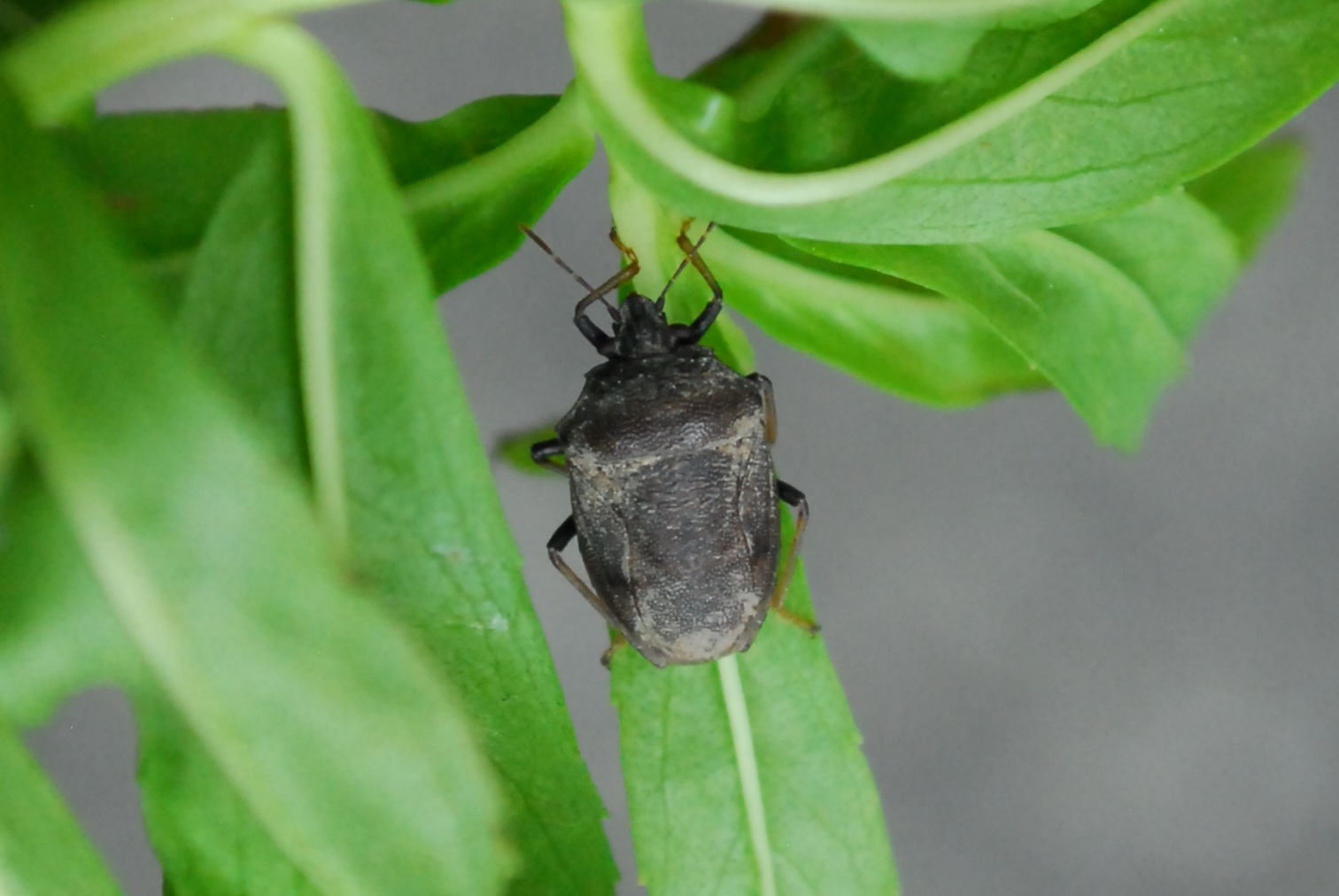
- Scotinophara coarctata found in Desa Buduk, Badung Regency, Bali, Indonesia

Scientific classification
- Kingdom: Animalia
- Phylum: Arthropoda
- Clade: Pancrustacea
- Class: Insecta
- Order: Hemiptera
- Suborder: Heteroptera
- Family: Pentatomidae
- Genus: Scotinophara
- Species: S. coarctata

Binomial name
- Scotinophara coarctata Fabricius, 1798

= Scotinophara coarctata =

Species of insect

Scotinophara coarctata is a species of shield bug in the family Pentatomidae. Commonly known as the rice black bug or Malayan black bug, it is an important pest of rice cultivation in several Asian countries where it feeds on plant sap and can cause significant crop losses.

== Distribution ==
Scotinophara coarctata is found in Southeast Asia and is particularly associated with rice-growing regions. The species has been reported from countries including India, the Philippines, Indonesia, Vietnam, Malaysia and Thailand. Heavy infestations may cause leaves to become yellow or brown and can lead to a condition known as "bug burn" in rice fields.
