= Amaurochrous dubius =

Scientific classification
- Domain: Eukaryota
- Kingdom: Animalia
- Phylum: Arthropoda
- Class: Insecta
- Order: Hemiptera
- Suborder: Heteroptera
- Family: Pentatomidae
- Genus: Amaurochrous
- Species: A. dubius

Binomial name
- Amaurochrous dubius (Palisot, 1805)

Synonyms
- Scutellera dubia Palisot, 1805

Species of true bug

Amaurochrous dubius is a species of turtle bug in the family Pentatomidae. It is found in the Caribbean, Central America, and North America.
