= Thoria =

Scientific classification
- Domain: Eukaryota
- Kingdom: Animalia
- Phylum: Arthropoda
- Class: Insecta
- Order: Hemiptera
- Suborder: Heteroptera
- Family: Pentatomidae
- Tribe: Podopini
- Genus: Thoria; Stål, 1865

Species
- Thoria gillonae Schouteden, 1963; Thoria gioharana Linnavuori, 1982; Thoria guineensis Jensen-Haarup, 1926; Thoria iadmon Linnavuori, 1982; Thoria major Schouteden, 1966; Thoria natalensis (Stål, 1853); Thoria neavei Schouteden, 1909; Thoria nimbensis Schouteden, 1964; Thoria odzaliensis Villiers, 1967; Thoria rotundata Villiers, 1951; Thoria sjostedti Schouteden, 1910; Thoria zuwanica Schouteden, 1917

Genus of shield bugs

Thoria is a genus of shield bugs in the tribe Podopini.
