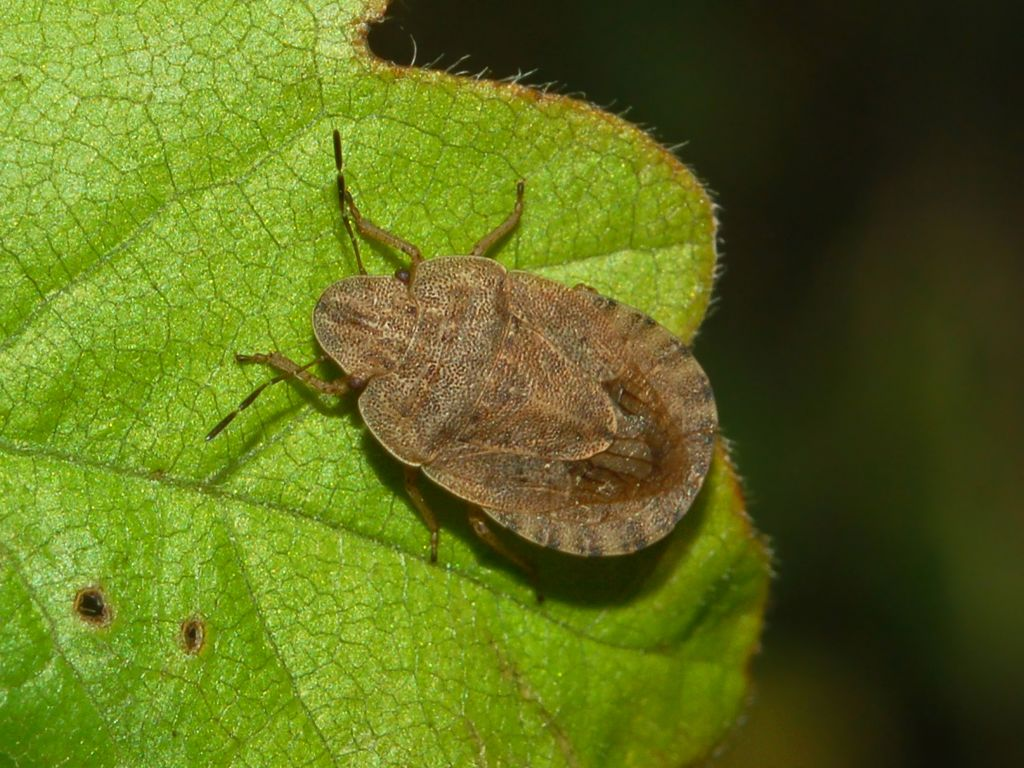
- Sciocoris homalonotus

Scientific classification
- Domain: Eukaryota
- Kingdom: Animalia
- Phylum: Arthropoda
- Class: Insecta
- Order: Hemiptera
- Suborder: Heteroptera
- Family: Pentatomidae
- Tribe: Sciocorini
- Genus: Sciocoris; Fallén, 1829

= Sciocoris =

Genus of true bugs

Sciocoris is a genus of shield bugs belonging to the family Pentatomidae, subfamily Pentatominae. The genus was erected by Carl Fredrik Fallén in 1829.

== Subgenera and species ==
Subgenus Aposciocoris Wagner, 1965

- Sciocoris cerrutii Wagner, 1959
- Sciocoris homalonotus Fieber, 1851
- Sciocoris luteolus Fieber, 1861
- Sciocoris macrocephalus Fieber, 1851
- Sciocoris microphthalmus Flor, 1860
- Sciocoris umbrinus (Wolff, 1804)

Subgenus Masthletinus Reuter, 1879

Subgenus Neosciocoris Wagner, 1965

- Sciocoris conspurcatus Klug, 1845
- Sciocoris fumipennis Puton, 1881
- Sciocoris maculatus Fieber, 1851
- Sciocoris pallens Klug, 1845
- Sciocoris sideritidis Wollaston, 1858

Subgenus Parasciocoris Wagner, 1965

Subgenus Sciocoris Fallén, 1829

- Sciocoris cursitans (Fabricius, 1794)
- Sciocoris distinctus Fieber, 1851
- Sciocoris galiberti Ribaut, 1926
- Sciocoris helferi Fieber, 1851
- Sciocoris ribauti Wagner, 1953
- Sciocoris sulcatus Fieber, 1851
- Sciocoris angularis Puton, 1889
- Sciocoris angusticollis Puton, 1895
- Sciocoris assimilis Fieber, 1851
- Sciocoris brevicollis Fieber, 1851
- Sciocoris canariensis Lindberg, 1953
- Sciocoris consobrinus Kiritshenko, 1952
- Sciocoris deltocephalus Fieber, 1861
- Sciocoris hoberlandti Wagner, 1954
- Sciocoris longifrons Barber, 1933
- Sciocoris ochraceus Fieber, 1861
- Sciocoris orientalis Linnavuori, 1960
- Sciocoris pentheri Wagner, 1953
- Sciocoris reflexus Fieber, 1851
