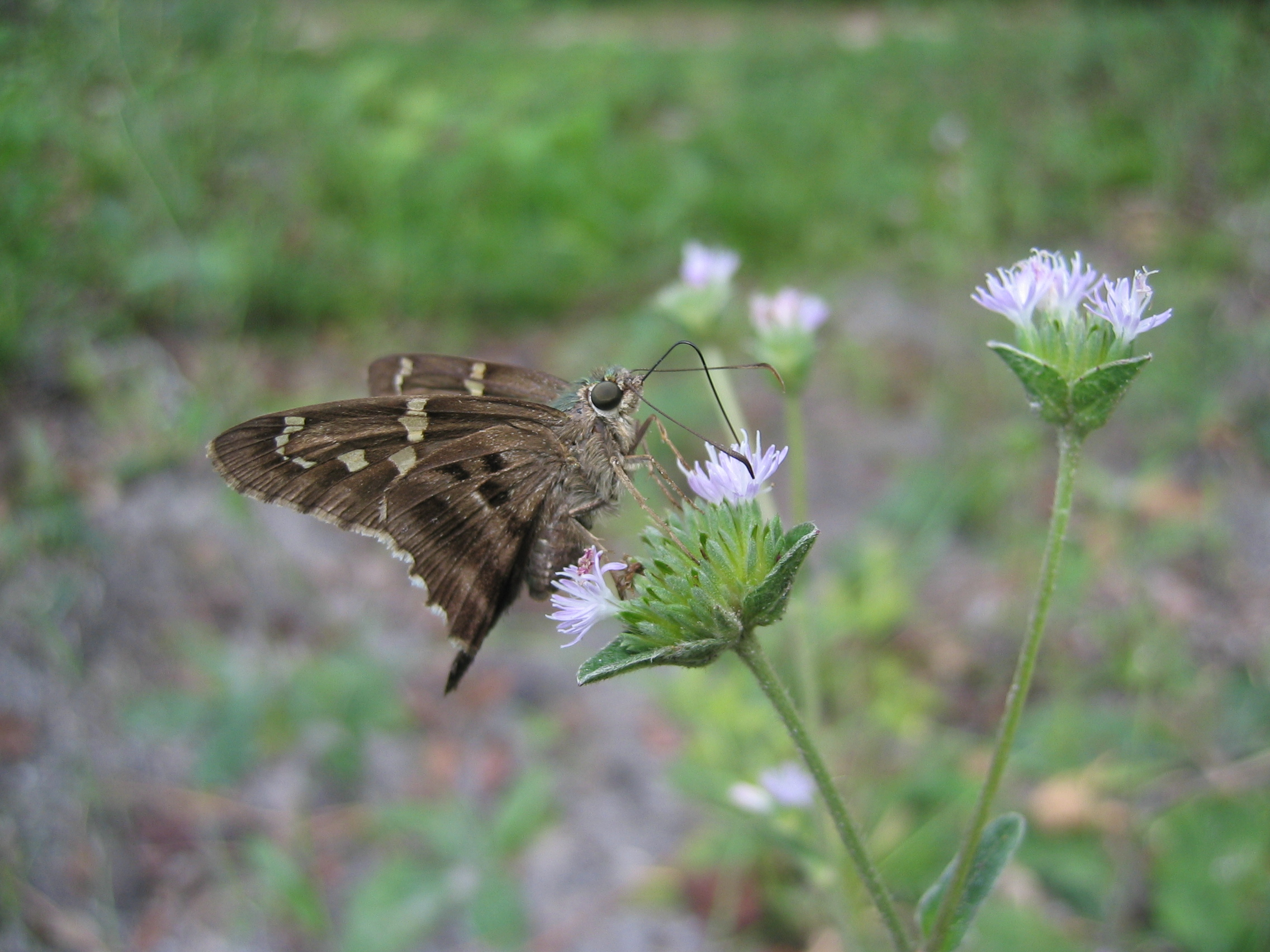

Conservation status
- Secure (NatureServe)

Scientific classification
- Kingdom: Animalia
- Phylum: Arthropoda
- Clade: Pancrustacea
- Class: Insecta
- Order: Lepidoptera
- Family: Hesperiidae
- Genus: Urbanus
- Species: U. proteus

Binomial name
- Urbanus proteus (Linnaeus, 1758)

= Long-tailed skipper =

Species of butterfly

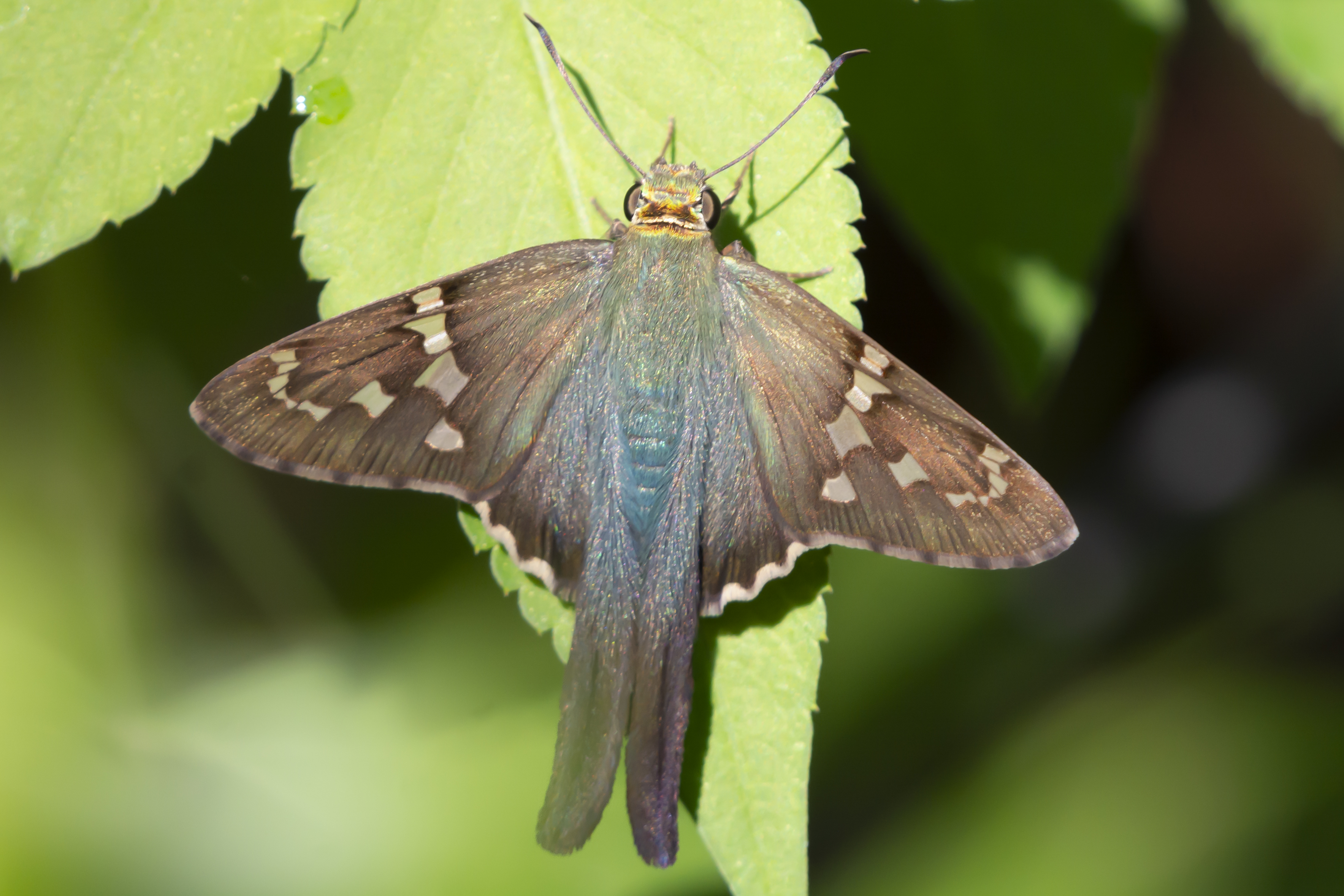
The blue coloring of the Long-Tailed Skipper.

The long-tailed skipper (Urbanus proteus) is a spread-winged skipper butterfly found throughout tropical and subtropical South America, south to Argentina and north into the eastern United States and southern Ontario. It cannot live in areas with prolonged frost. It is a showy butterfly, with wings of light brown tinted with iridescent blue, and two long tails extending from the hindwings. The robust body is light blue dorsally. It has a large head, prominent eyes, and a wingspan between 4.5 and 6 centimeters.

== Life cycle ==
It lays white or yellow eggs, singly or in small clusters, which hatch into a caterpillar with a yellowish body and large, dark head. After two to three weeks, the caterpillar forms a pupa. Its pupa is contained in a rolled leaf and covered in fine bluish hairs. The pupa stage may last from one to three weeks, after which the adult emerges.

The caterpillar of this skipper is a common pest of crops, especially beans, in the southern United States. For this reason, it is sometimes called the bean leafroller in that area. The caterpillars feed on leaves of plants in the legume family such as wisteria and butterfly peas and then roll the leaves around themselves, lining the cavity with silk, to pupate. The adults feed on nectar from flowers. Natural enemies of this species include wasp and fly parasitoids, and the Florida predatory stink bug, (Euthyrhynchus floridanus). In the fall, a nuclear polyhedrosis virus killed up to 50% of the larvae.

== Sub-species ==
U. p. domingo flies in the Bahamas and throughout the West Indies, but it is only weakly differentiated from the nominate form, chiefly by its reduced white markings.

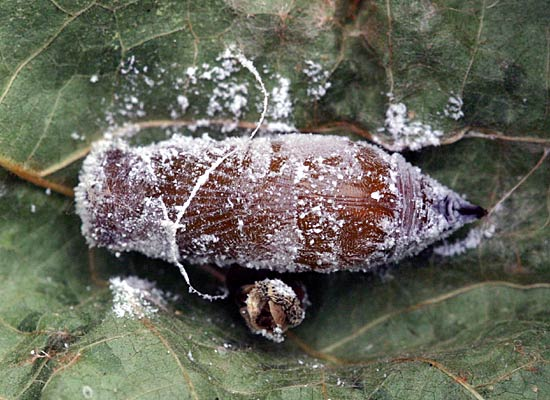
Pupa

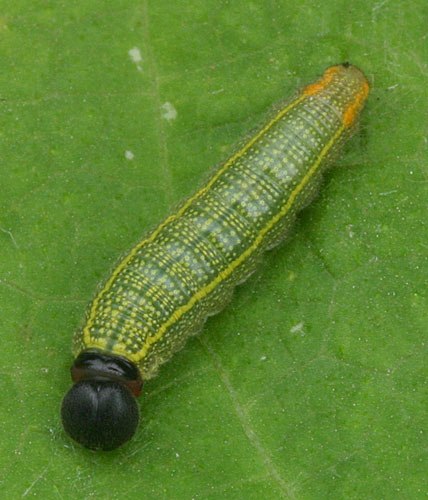
Caterpillar

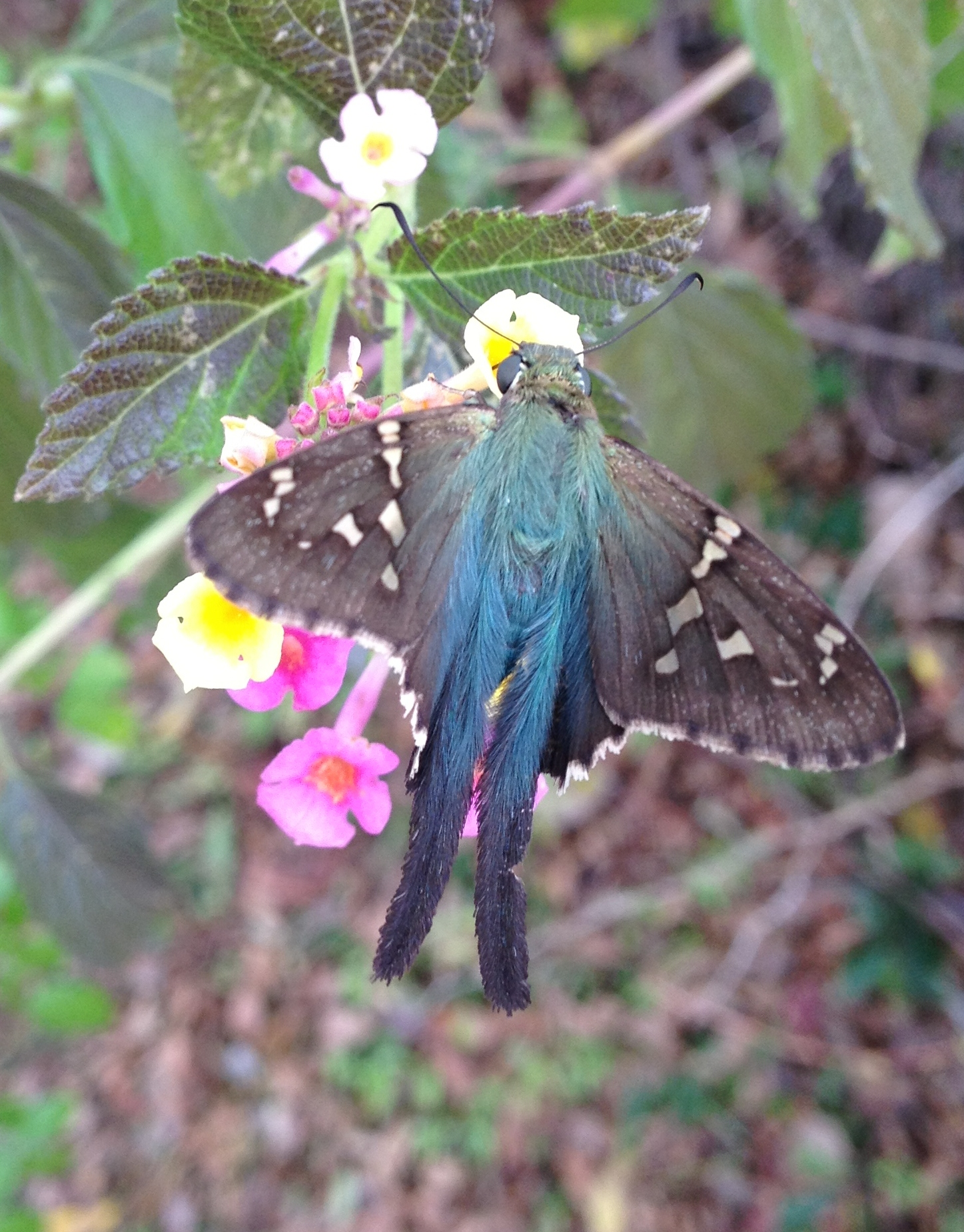

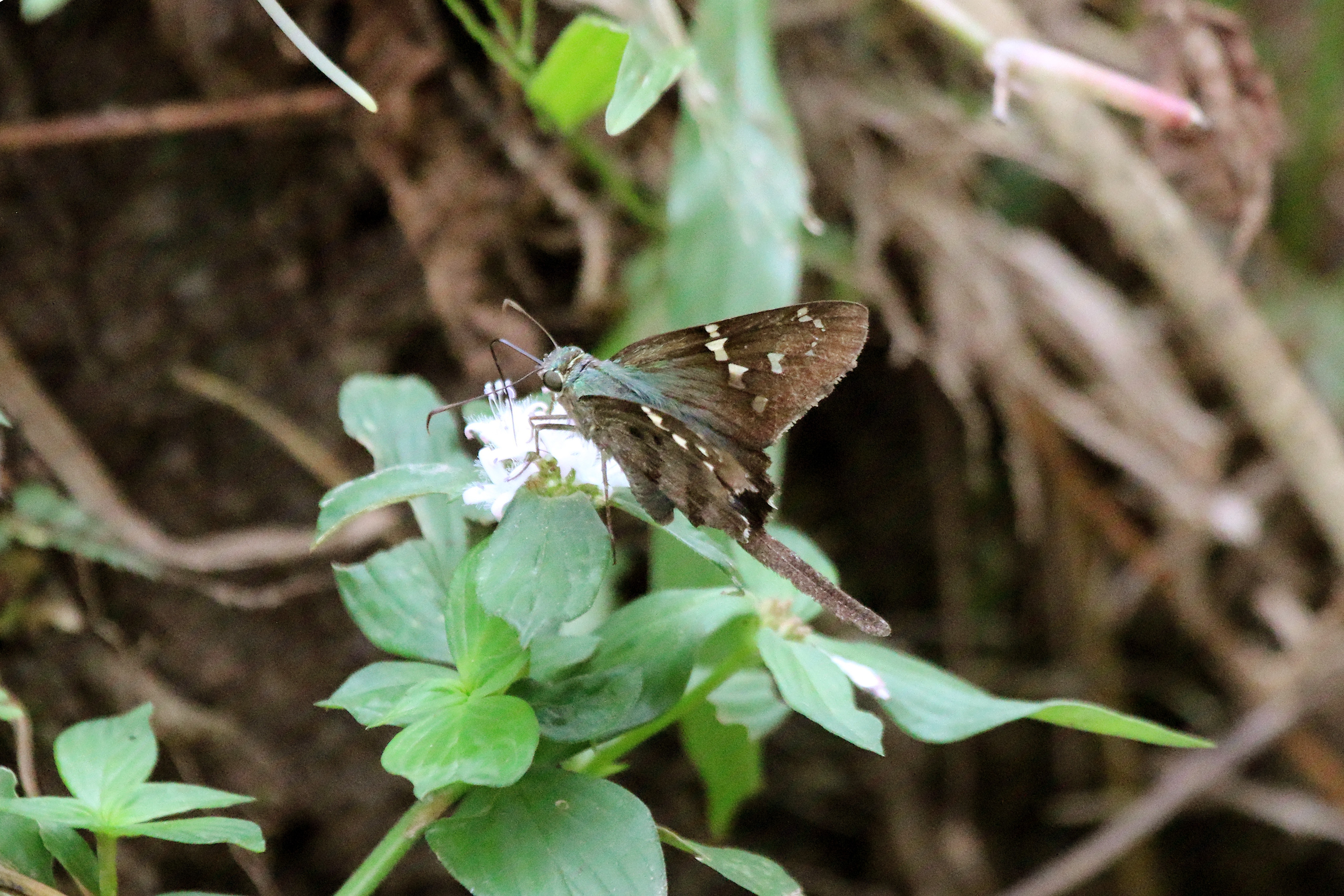
U. p. domingo, Jamaica

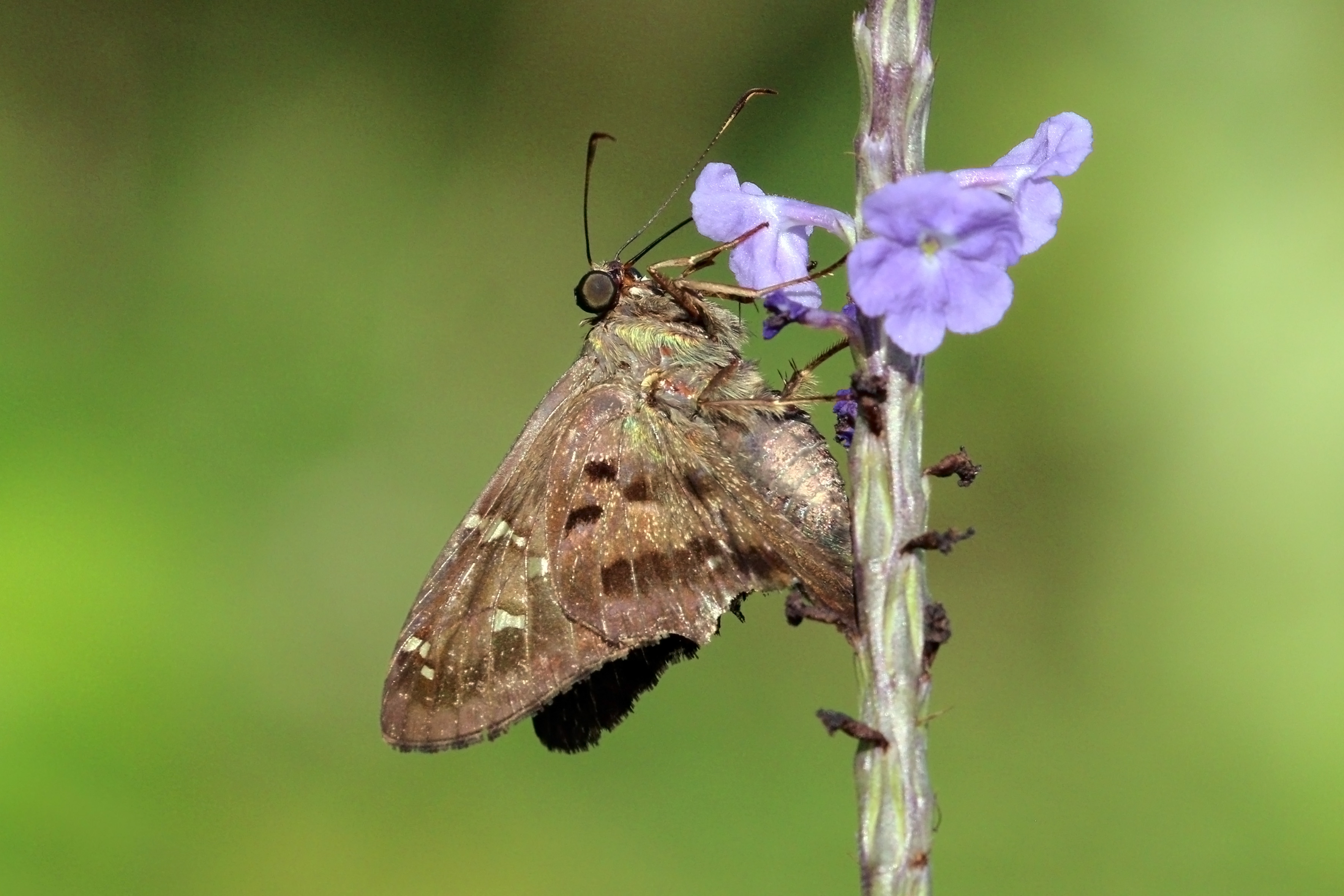
U. p. domingo, Grand Cayman
