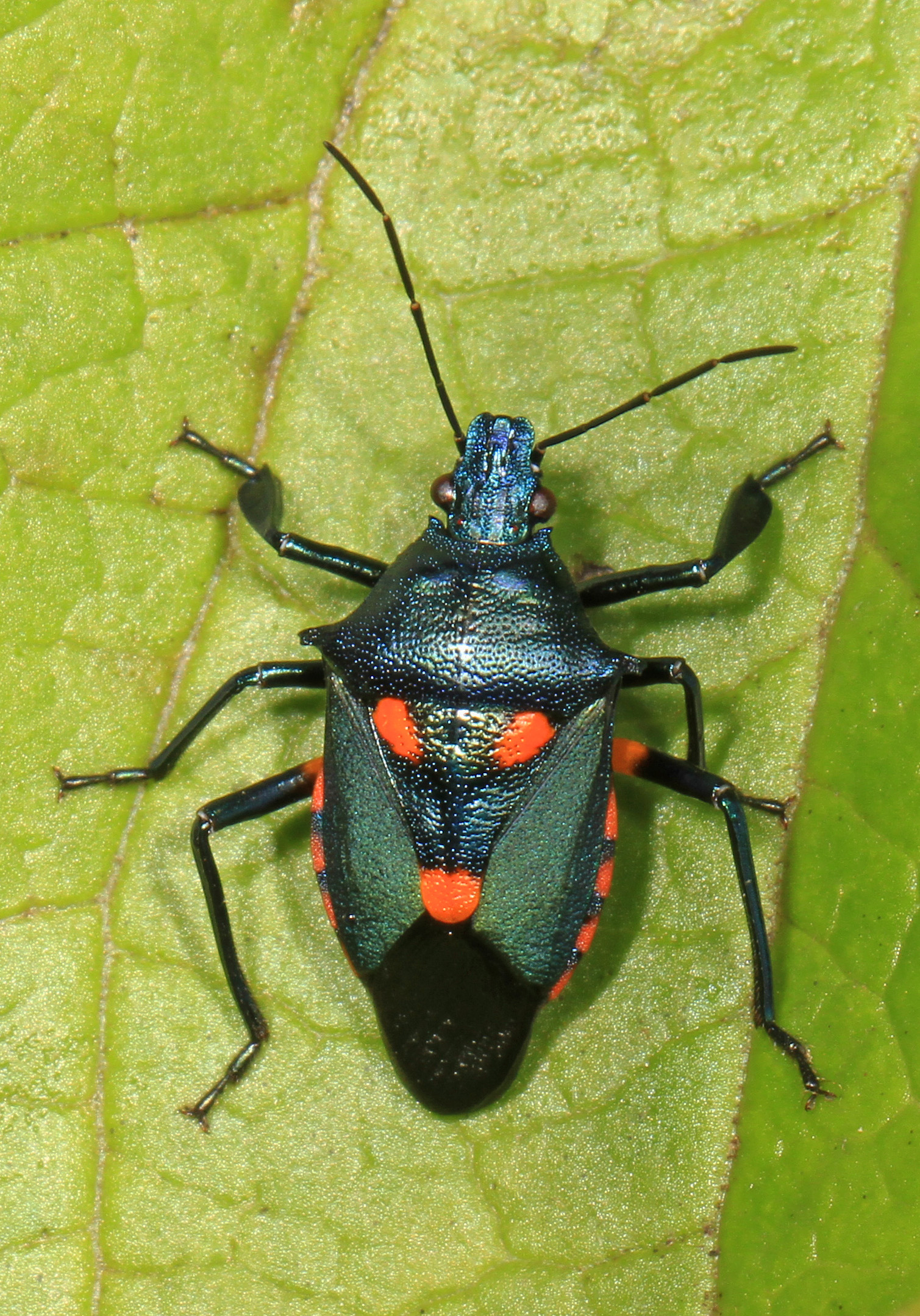

Scientific classification
- Kingdom: Animalia
- Phylum: Arthropoda
- Class: Insecta
- Order: Hemiptera
- Suborder: Heteroptera
- Superfamily: Pentatomoidea
- Family: Pentatomidae
- Subfamily: Asopinae
- Genus: Euthyrhynchus; Dallas, 1851
- Species: E. floridanus

Binomial name
- Euthyrhynchus floridanus (Linnaeus, 1767)

= Euthyrhynchus floridanus =

Species of true bug

Euthyrhynchus floridanus, the Florida predatory stink bug, is a species of carnivorous shield bug in the family Pentatomidae, the only species in the genus Euthyrhynchus. It is native to the hottest parts of the southeastern United States and is considered beneficial because its diet includes many species of pest insects.

== Description ==
The adult male Florida predatory stink bug is approximately 12 mm (0.5 in) long while the female can reach 17 mm (0.7 in) in length. The appearance is somewhat variable, but the ground colour is usually bluish-black or purplish-brown, and there are characteristic red spots at the sides and rear of the scutellum. There is also a distinctive spine on the humerus, but this species lacks the spine on the underside of the femur on the front leg that exists in other similar species found in Florida. The first segment of the beak-like mouthparts is short and thick which is in contrast to the slender mouthparts of its herbivorous, sap-sucking relatives.

== Ecology ==
The female lays batches of between twenty and ninety eggs. These are barrel-shaped and have a number of small projections at the edge of the operculum. The nymphs go through five instars in their growth process and have bluish-black heads and thoraxes and red abdomens. The first instars stay close to the egg mass and the later instars also tend to group together, sometimes feeding on a common prey item. In the laboratory, the nymphs have fed on larvae of the greater wax moth (Galleria mellonella), several stages of the Mexican bean beetle (Epilachna varivestis), larvae of tobacco budworm (Heliothis virescens) and larvae of black cutworms (Agrotis ipsilon). Other recorded prey include beetles, planthoppers, weevils, larvae of the long-tailed skipper (Urbanus proteus), and the southern green stink bug (Nezara viridula). The insects have been found on a range of plant types including ornamental plants, citrus, weeds, grasses, trees, bushes and other habitats.

Euthyrhynchus floridanus has a longer period of development than any of its close relatives in the subfamily Asopinae. At 24 °C (75 °F) the eggs hatch in 35 days and the nymphal development takes 65 days. At 27 °C (81 °F) these figures are 20 and 40 days respectively. As the adult female takes about a fortnight to mature, and lays a total of about 140 eggs, populations of this bug do not build up as quickly as some other species with shorter life cycles.

== Gallery ==
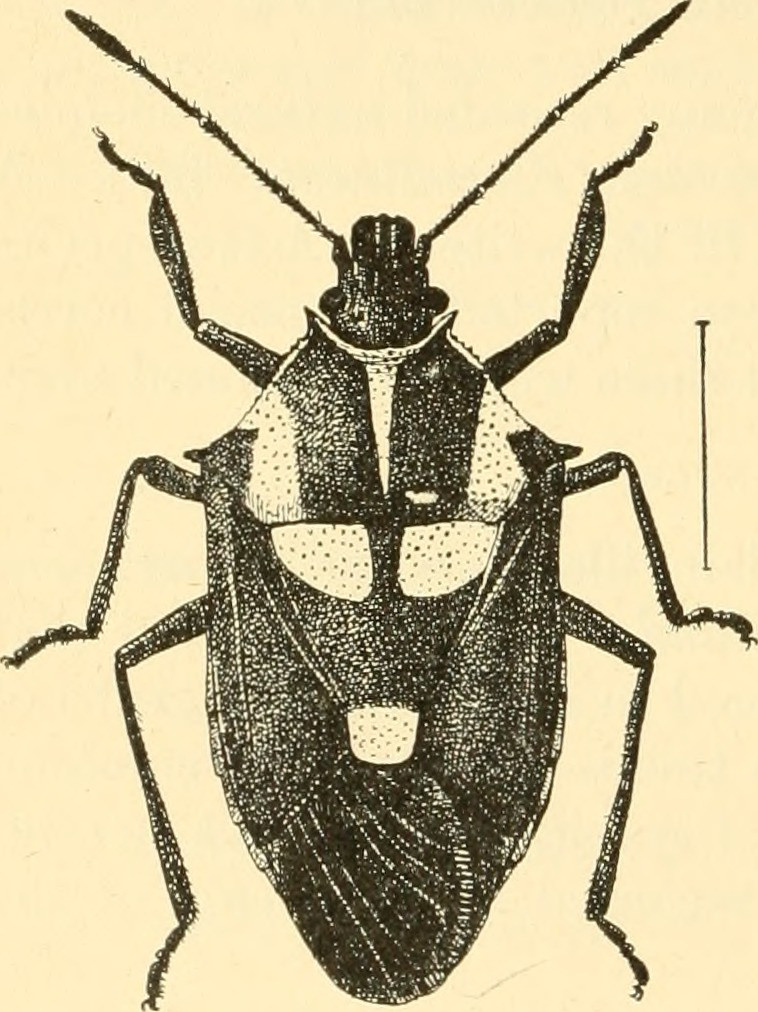
Illustration of adult

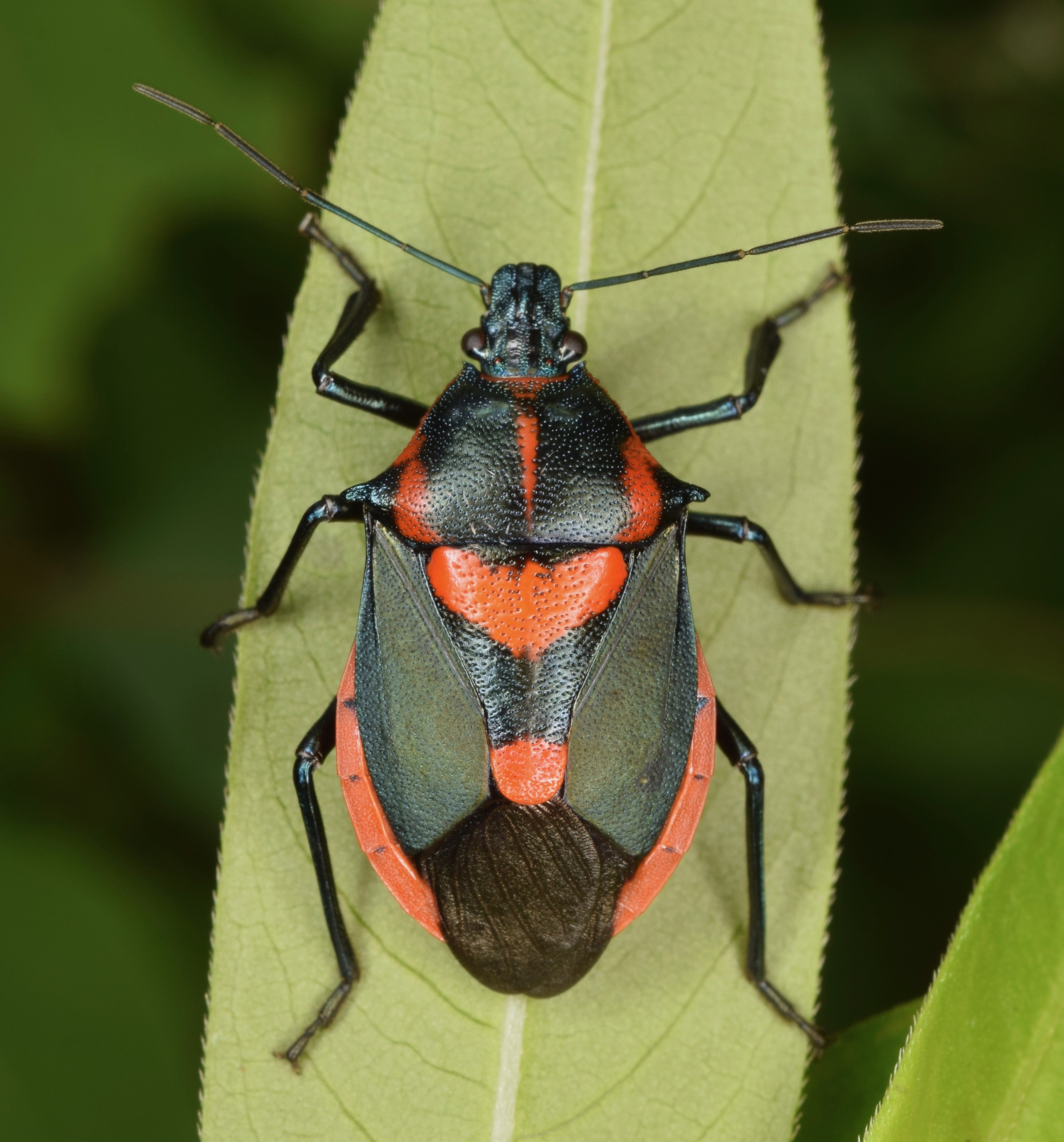
Adult E. floridanus

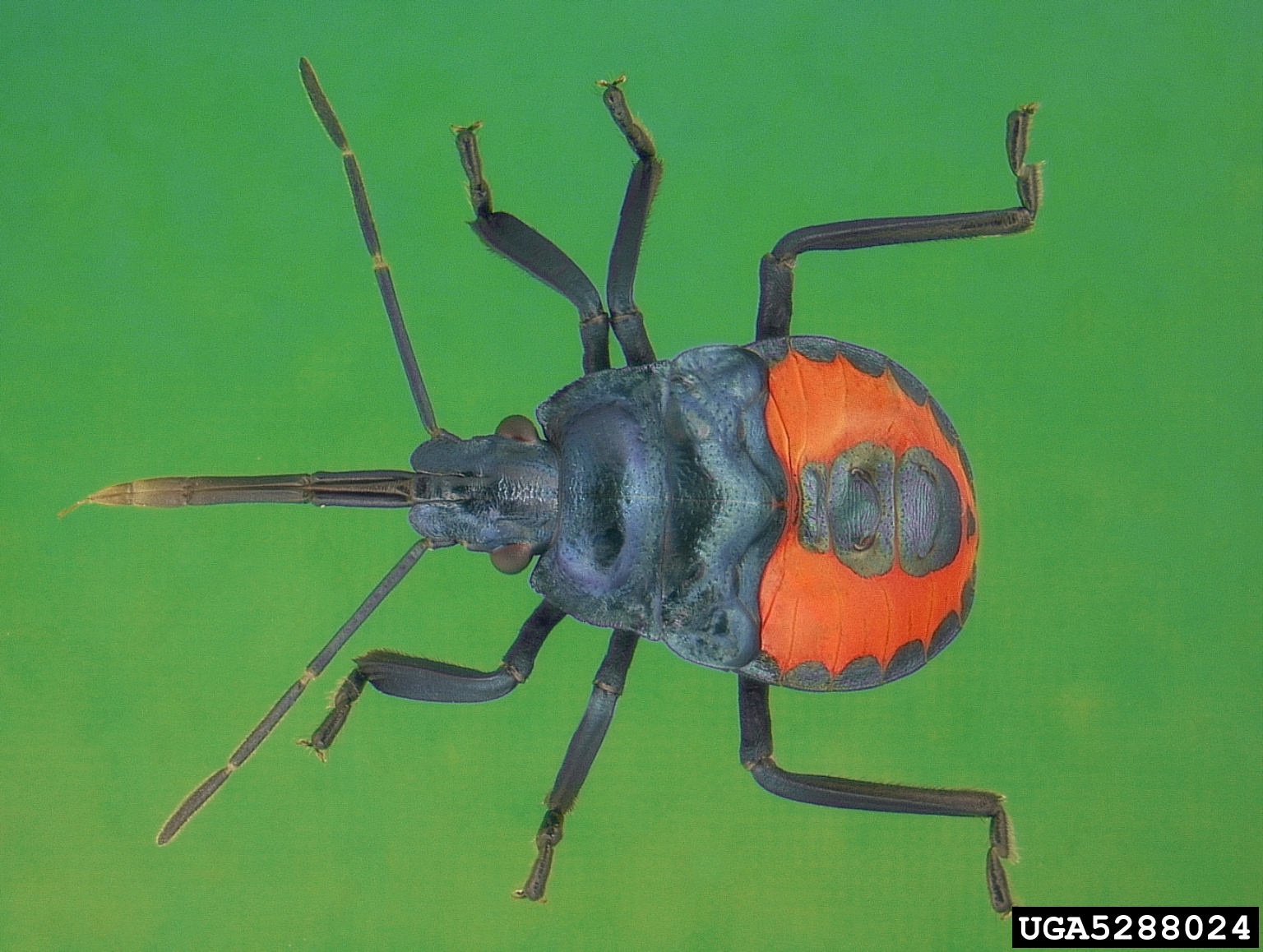
Nymph E. floridanus

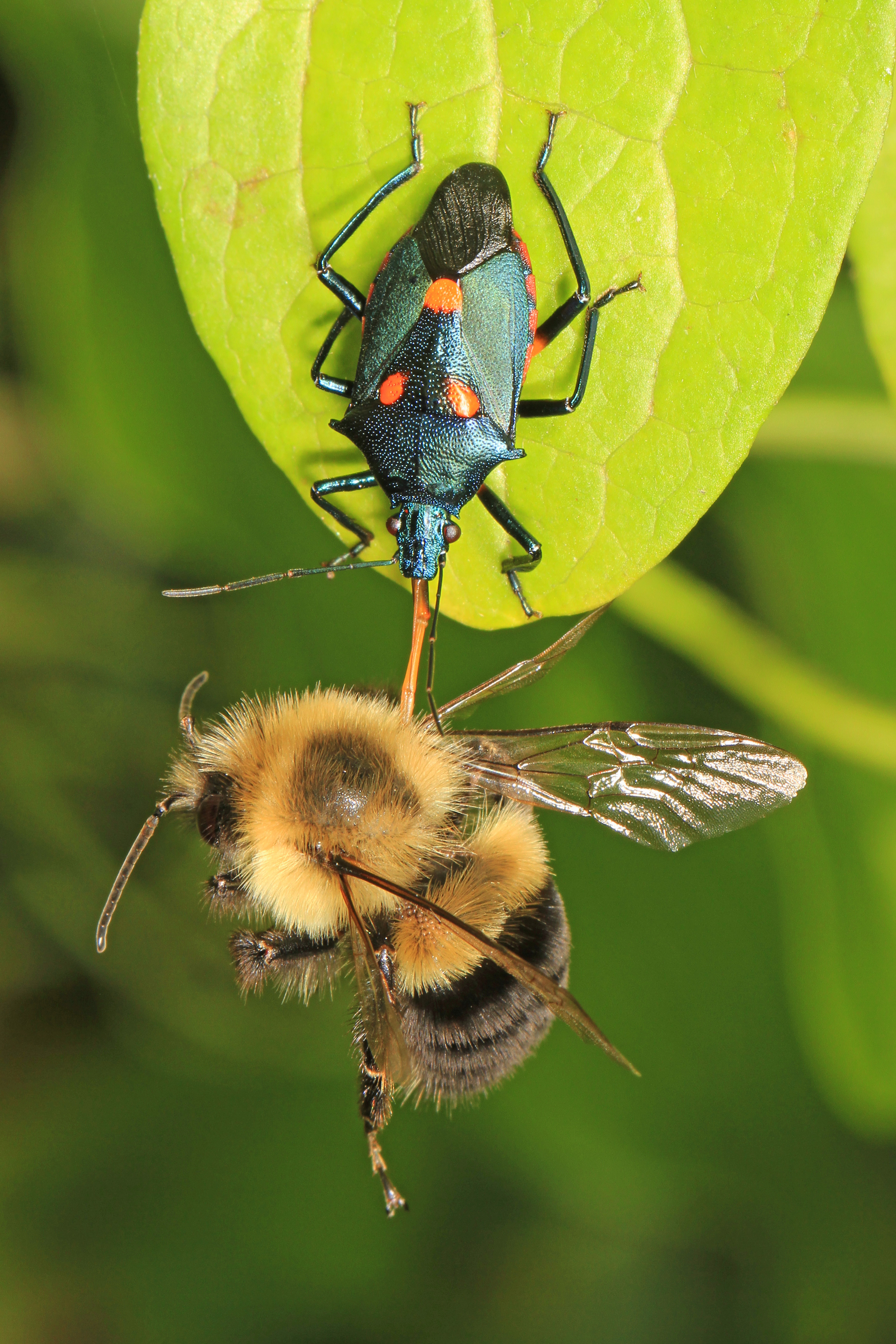
E. floridanus hunting a bee

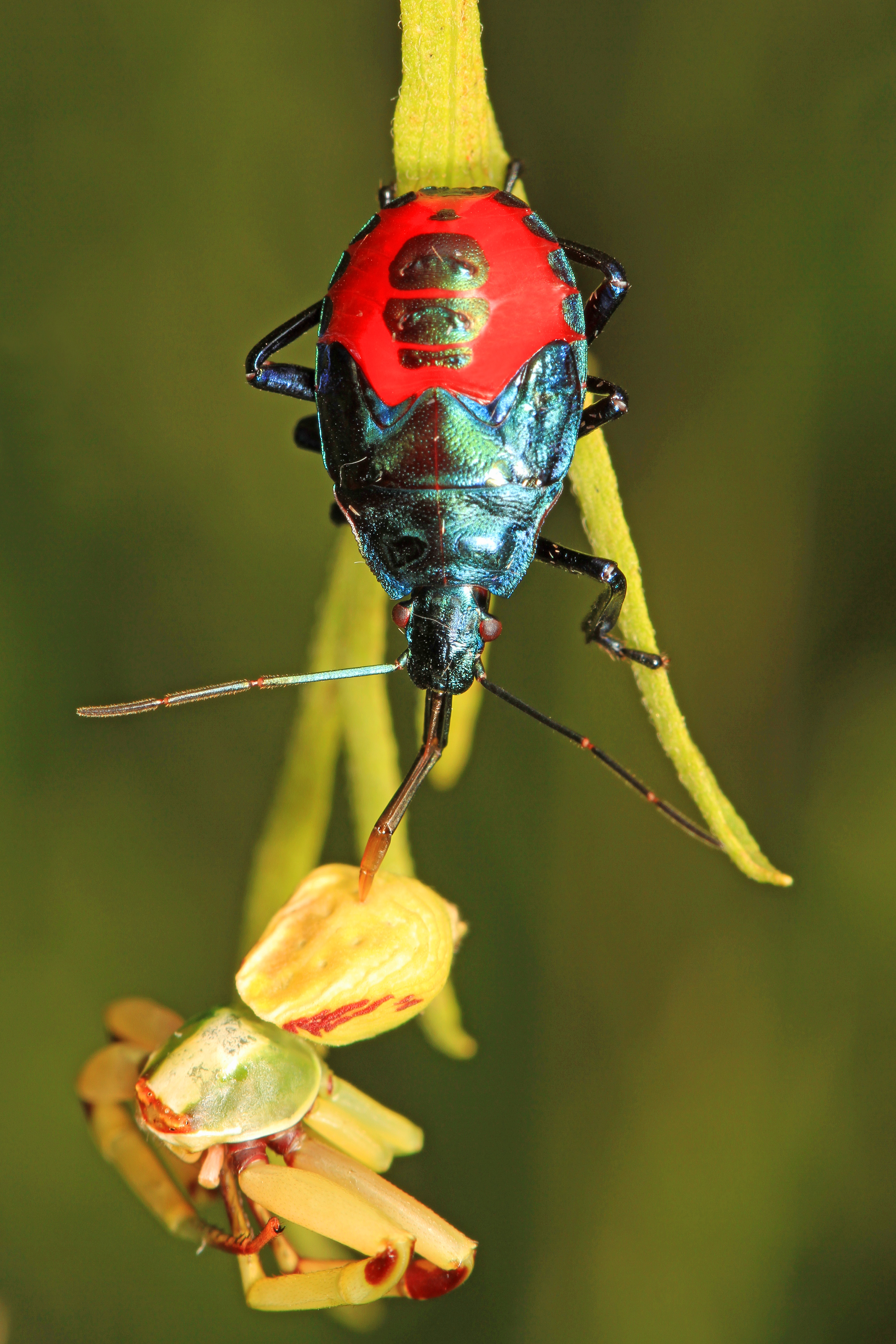
E. floridanus hunting a crab spider
