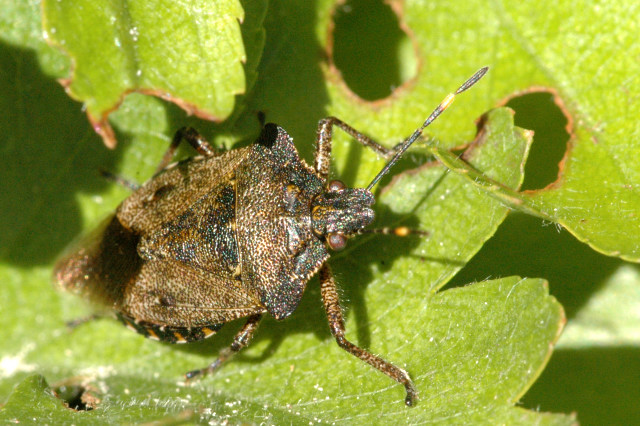
- Adult Troilus luridus

Scientific classification
- Domain: Eukaryota
- Kingdom: Animalia
- Phylum: Arthropoda
- Class: Insecta
- Order: Hemiptera
- Suborder: Heteroptera
- Family: Pentatomidae
- Genus: Troilus
- Species: T. luridus

Binomial name
- Troilus luridus (Fabricius, 1775)

Synonyms
- Cimex luridus Fabricius, 1775

= Troilus luridus =

Species of insects

Troilus luridus, also known as the bronze shieldbug, is a species of shield bug found in Europe. It was first described by the Danish zoologist Johan Christian Fabricius in 1775. Shieldbugs are generally phytophagous (i.e., feeding on plant sap) and some, including Troilus luridus, are also carnivorous and will eat the larvae of beetles, lepidoptera and sawflies.

== Description ==
Troilus luridus is a large predatory bronze-brown shieldbug in the family Pentatomidae. It measures about 10 to 12 mm in length and has a distinctive, orange band on the penultimate antennal segment. The legs are brown and the scutellum lacks an orange tip. Live prey is essential to development and adults walk slowly about in search of their prey; usually larvae, but sometimes the adults of beetles, butterflies and moths. They hold the prey at the tip of its rostrum using their mandibular and maxillary stylets which spread out within the prey cutting away at tissues.

The bugs overwinter as adults and, depending on temperature, emerge in April. Eggs are laid in May and June and are laid in batches, initially around 21, with the number reducing with each batch, until they are only laid in ones and twos. At temperatures of 19 to 20 °C develop in 10 to 12 days. First instar larvae are phytophagous and gregarious, and there are five instars. New adults can be found from July onwards, depending on temperature, humidity and available prey.

== Distribution ==
The bronze shieldbug is found in most of Europe and is one of four carnivorous species found in Great Britain. Although never seen in great numbers, it is probably very common as it inhabits trees and those seen in the lower branches are a small fraction of the population.
