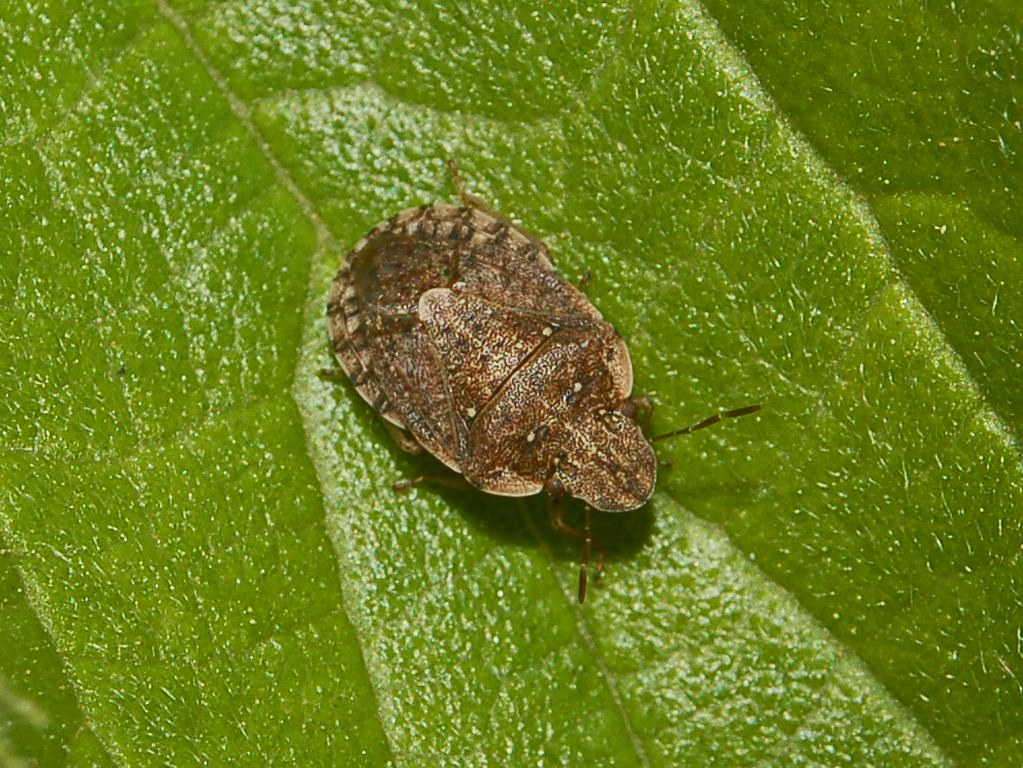

Scientific classification
- Domain: Eukaryota
- Kingdom: Animalia
- Phylum: Arthropoda
- Class: Insecta
- Order: Hemiptera
- Suborder: Heteroptera
- Family: Pentatomidae
- Genus: Sciocoris
- Species: S. sideritidis

Binomial name
- Sciocoris sideritidis Wollaston, 1858

Synonyms
- Sciocoris fumipennis (Puton, 1851)

= Sciocoris sideritidis =

Species of true bug

Sciocoris sideritidis is a species of shield bug belonging to the family Pentatomidae, subfamily Pentatominae.

The head is quite characteristic and stretched with the ante-ocular part closer than in other species. Its eyes are prominent from the edge of the head. Scutellum is about as wide as long.

It is mainly found in France and Italy.
