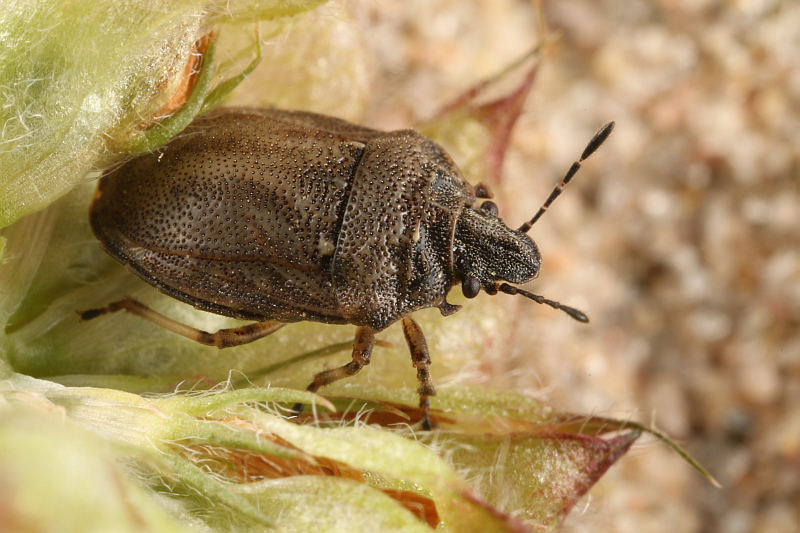
- Podops inunctus

Scientific classification
- Domain: Eukaryota
- Kingdom: Animalia
- Phylum: Arthropoda
- Class: Insecta
- Order: Hemiptera
- Suborder: Heteroptera
- Family: Pentatomidae
- Subfamily: Podopinae; Amyot & Serville, 1843

= Podopinae =

Subfamily of true bugs

Podopinae, known as turtle bugs, are a subfamily of the insect family Pentatomidae. The type genus is Podops.

== Tribes and Genera ==
BioLib lists:

=== Brachycerocorini ===
Auth. Davidova-Vilimova & Stys, 1993

1. Bolbocoris Amyot & Serville, 1843
2. Brachycerocoris Costa, 1863
3. Phymatocoris Stål, 1853

=== Deroploini ===
Auth. Davidova-Vilimova & Stys, 1994

1. Dandinus Distant, 1904
2. Deroploa Westwood, 1835
3. Deroploopsis Schouteden, 1905
4. Eufroggattia Goding, 1903
5. Jeffocoris Davidová-Vílimová, 1993
6. Numilia Stål, 1867
7. Propetestrica Musgrave, 1930
8. Protestrica Schouteden, 1905
9. Testrica Walker, 1867

=== Graphosomatini ===
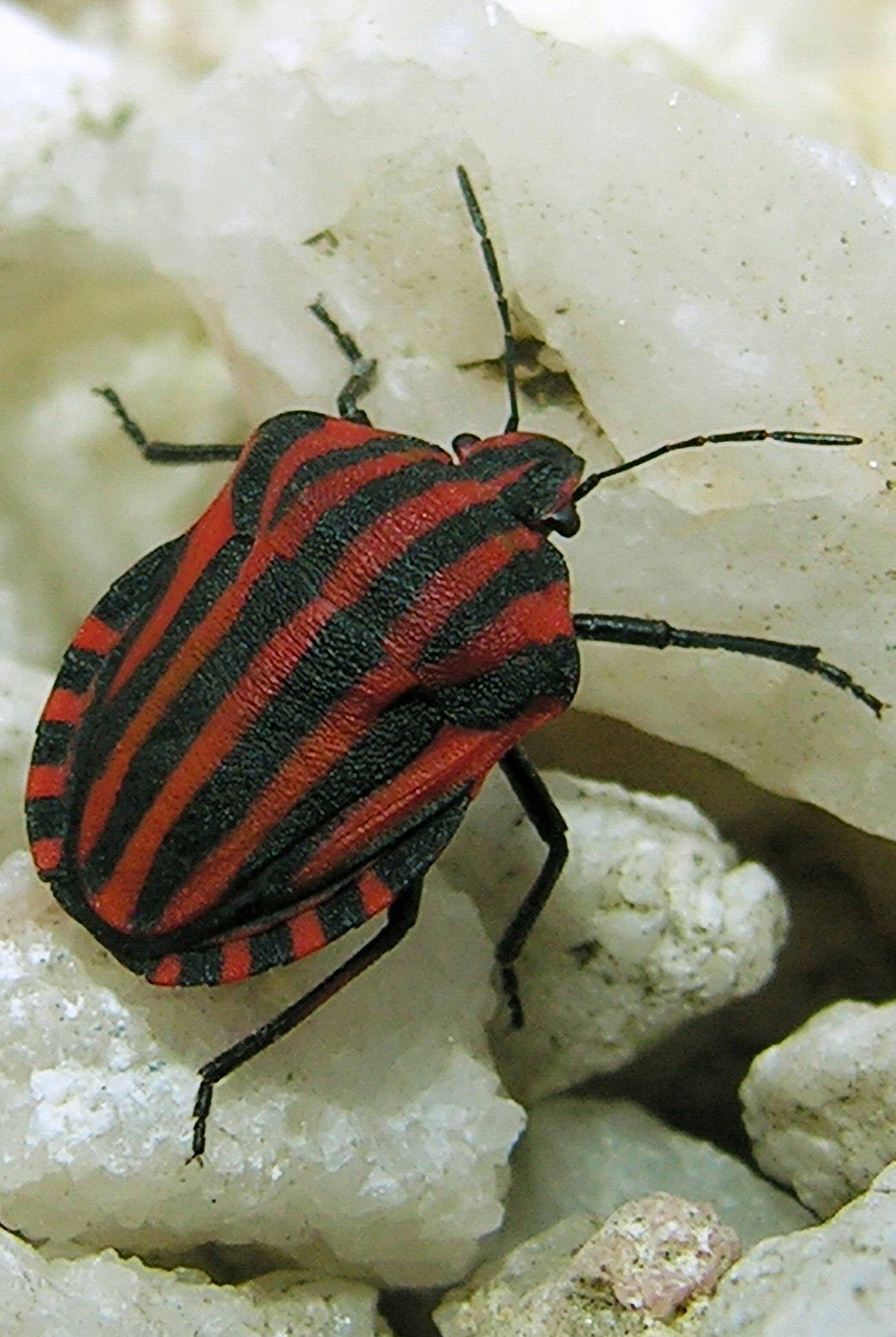
Graphosoma italicum

Auth. Mulsant & Rey, 1865

1. Ancyrosoma Amyot & Serville, 1843
2. Asaroticus Jakovlev, 1884
3. Crypsinus Dohrn, 1860
4. Derula Mulsant & Rey, 1856
5. Geocrypha Bergroth, 1906
6. Graphosoma Laporte de Castelnau, 1833
7. Hybocoris Kiritshenko, 1913
8. Leprosoma Bärensprung, 1859
9. Neoleprosoma Kormilev & Pirán, 1952
10. Oplistochilus Jakovlev, 1887
11. Parabolbocoris Schouteden, 1903
12. Putonia Stål, 1872
13. Sternodontus Mulsant & Rey, 1856
14. Tholagmus Stål, 1860
15. Tshingisella Kiritshenko, 1913
16. Ventocoris Hahn, 1834
17. Vilpianus Stål, 1860

=== Podopini ===
Auth. Amyot & Serville, 1843

1. Allopodops Harris & Johnston, 1936
2. Amaurochrous Stål, 1872
3. Amauropepla Stål, 1867
4. Aspidestrophus Stål, 1854
5. Burrus Distant, 1908
6. Coracanthella Musgrave, 1930
7. Crollius Distant, 1901
8. Gambiana Distant, 1911
9. Haullevillea Schouteden, 1903
10. Kayesia Schouteden, 1903
11. Melanophara Stål, 1867
12. Moffartsia Schouteden, 1909
13. Neapodops Slater & Baranowski, 1970
14. Notopodops Barber & Sailer, 1953
15. Oncozygia Stål, 1872
16. Oncozygidea Reuter, 1882
17. Podops Laporte de Castelnau, 1833
18. Scotinophara Stål, 1867
19. Sepidiocoris Schouteden, 1903
20. Severinina Schouteden, 1903
21. Storthecoris Horváth, 1883
22. Tahitocoris Yang, 1935
23. Thoria Stål, 1865
24. Tornosia Bolívar, 1879
25. Weda Schouteden, 1905

=== Tarisini ===
Auth. Stål, 1872

1. Cryptogamocoris Carapezza, 1997
2. Dybowskyia Jakovlev, 1876
3. Tarisa Amyot & Serville, 1843

=== Unplaced genera ===
1. Cyptocoris Burmeister, 1845
2. Eobanus Distant, 1901
3. Kundelungua Schouteden, 1951
4. Neocazira Distant, 1883
5. Stysiellus Gapon, 2008
