= Crypsinus =

Scientific classification
- Domain: Eukaryota
- Kingdom: Animalia
- Phylum: Arthropoda
- Class: Insecta
- Order: Hemiptera
- Suborder: Heteroptera
- Family: Pentatomidae
- Subfamily: Podopinae
- Tribe: Graphosomatini
- Genus: Crypsinus; Dohrn, 1860
- Species: C. angustatus

Binomial name
- Crypsinus angustatus (Bärensprung, 1859)

Genus of insects

Crypsinus is a monotypic genus of shield bugs in the tribe Graphosomatini, containing the species Crypsinus angustatus.
