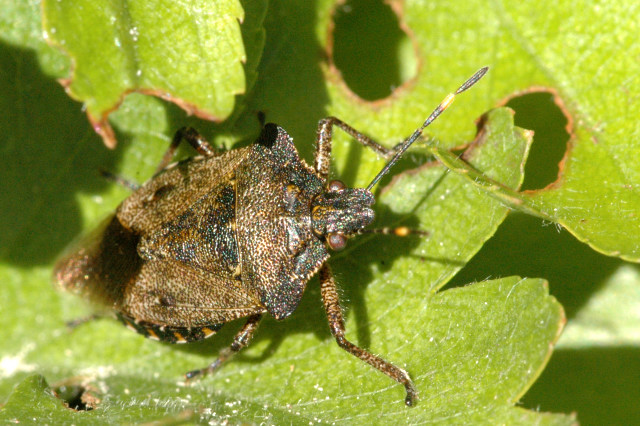
- Troilus luridus

Scientific classification
- Domain: Eukaryota
- Kingdom: Animalia
- Phylum: Arthropoda
- Class: Insecta
- Order: Hemiptera
- Suborder: Heteroptera
- Family: Pentatomidae
- Subfamily: Asopinae
- Genus: Troilus; Stål, 1868

= Troilus (bug) =

Genus of true bugs

Troilus is a genus of shield bugs in the family Pentatomidae. There are at least two described species in Troilus.

Some species of this genus are found in Europe.

== Species ==
These species belong to the genus Troilus:

- Troilus luridus (Fabricius, 1775)^{g} palearctic distribution
- Troilus maracaja Bernardes, Schwertner & Grazia, 2011^{g}
- Troilus testaceus Zheng & Liu, 1987 from Yunnan, China

Data sources: i = ITIS, c = Catalogue of Life, g = GBIF, b = Bugguide.net
