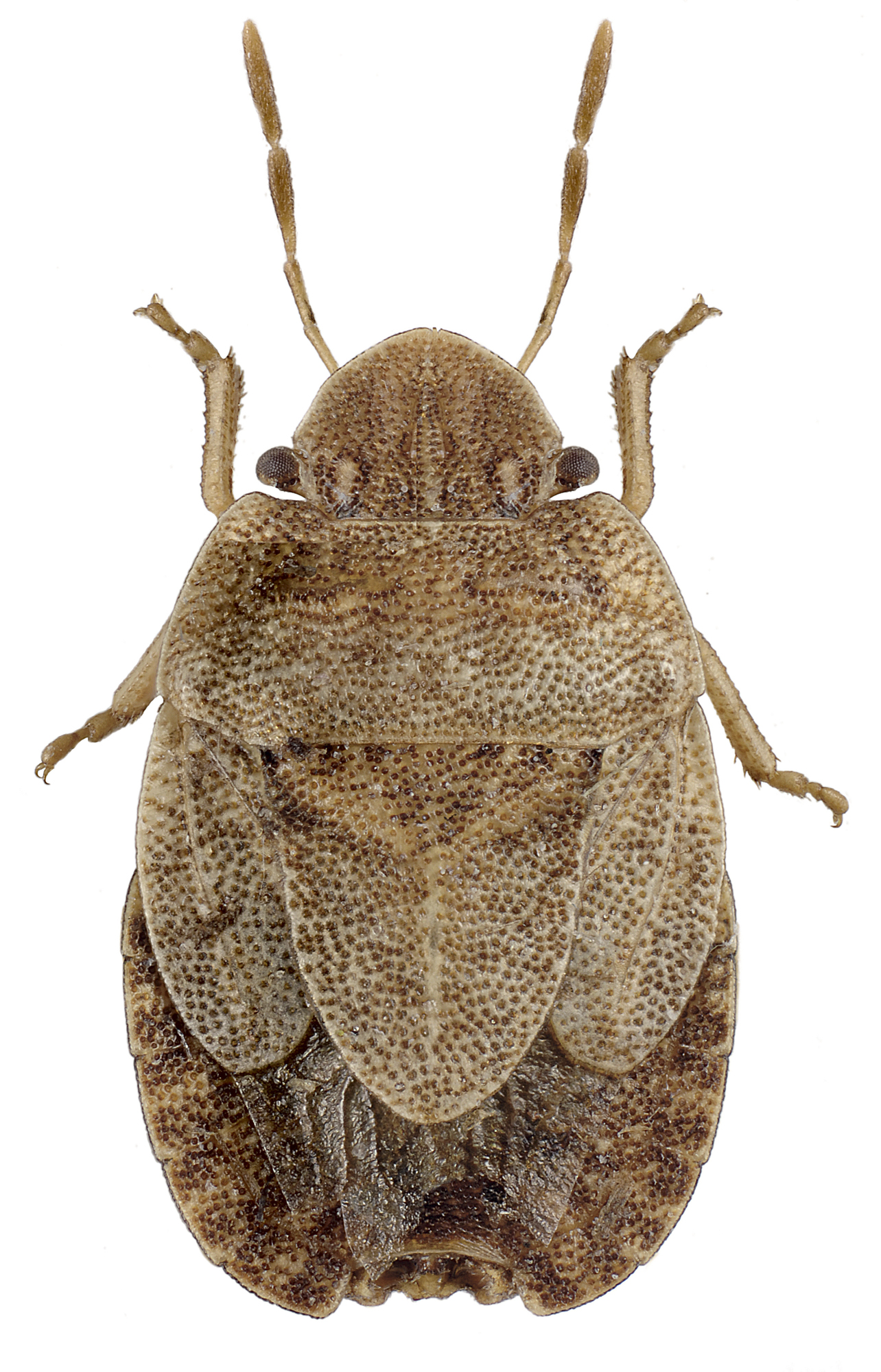

Scientific classification
- Domain: Eukaryota
- Kingdom: Animalia
- Phylum: Arthropoda
- Class: Insecta
- Order: Hemiptera
- Suborder: Heteroptera
- Family: Pentatomidae
- Tribe: Sciocorini
- Genus: Sciocoris
- Species: S. microphthalmus

Binomial name
- Sciocoris microphthalmus Flor, 1860

= Sciocoris microphthalmus =

Species of true bug

Sciocoris microphthalmus is a species of stink bug in the family Pentatomidae. It is found in Europe and Northern Asia (excluding China), North America, and Southern Asia.
