= Dybowskyia =

Scientific classification
- Kingdom: Animalia
- Phylum: Arthropoda
- Clade: Pancrustacea
- Class: Insecta
- Order: Hemiptera
- Suborder: Heteroptera
- Family: Pentatomidae
- Subfamily: Podopinae
- Tribe: Tarisini
- Genus: Dybowskyia; Jakovlev, 1876

Synonyms
- Svarinella Balthasar, 1937; Dybowskia Jakovlev, 1876

Genus of true bugs

Dybowskyia is a genus of true bugs belonging to the family Pentatomidae and tribe Tarisini.

The species of this genus are found in Europe and Japan.

Species:

- Dybowskyia reticulata (Dallas, 1851)
