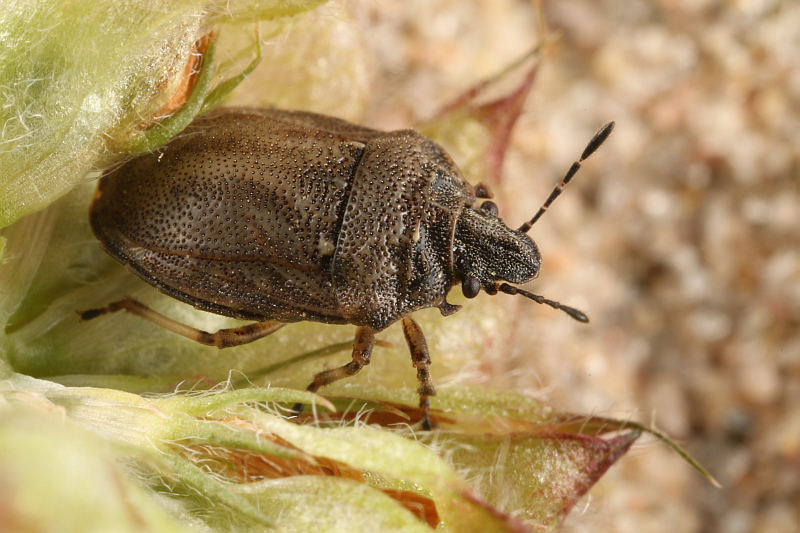
- Podops inunctus

Scientific classification
- Domain: Eukaryota
- Kingdom: Animalia
- Phylum: Arthropoda
- Class: Insecta
- Order: Hemiptera
- Suborder: Heteroptera
- Family: Pentatomidae
- Subfamily: Podopinae
- Tribe: Podopini
- Genus: Podops; Laporte de Castelnau, 1833

= Podops =

Genus of true bugs

Podops is a genus of Palaearctic bugs, in the family Pentatomidae; it is the type genus of the subfamily Podopinae and tribe Podopini. Species are recorded from Europe and includes the type species P. inunctus, which can be found in the British Isles.

== Species ==
BioLib lists the following:

Subgenus Opocrates Horváth, 1883

1. Podops annulicornis Jakovlev, 1877
2. Podops curvidens A. Costa, 1843
3. Podops rectidens Horváth, 1883

Subgenus Petalodera Horváth, 1883

1. Podops buccatus Horváth, 1883
2. Podops dilatata Fieber in Puton, 1873
3. Podops tangirus (Fabricius, 1803)

Subgenus Podops Laporte de Castelnau, 1833

1. Podops calligerus Horváth, 1887
2. Podops inunctus (Fabricius, 1775) (synonym P. inuncta)
  type species (as Cimex inunctus Fabricius, 1775)
3. Podops retowskii Horváth, 1883
