= Reece Sailer =

American entomologist

Reece Ivan Sailer (8 November 1915 – 8 September 1986) was an American entomologist who specialized in classical biological control and the systematics of the bugs in the family Pentatomidae.

Sailer was born in Roseville, Illinois where he went to school. He attended Western Illinois State Teacher's College followed by University of Kansas, where he received an A.B. in 1938 and a Ph.D. in 1942. His doctoral work was on the systematics of the genus Trichocorixa (Hemiptera) under H.B. Hungerford.

Sailer worked as an assistant entomologist for the State of Kansas and then joined the US Department of Agriculture specializing in the taxonomy of true bugs. He also worked on the effects of DDT on forest insects and studied biting flies and mosquitoes in Alaska.

In 1960 Sailer moved to Paris to work in the European Parasite Laboratory. He moved back to the US in 1966 and worked for the USDA's Insect Identification and Parasite Introduction Research branch, in Beltsville, Maryland. He joined the University of Florida in 1973 and worked as a professor of entomology, teaching courses in biological control.
