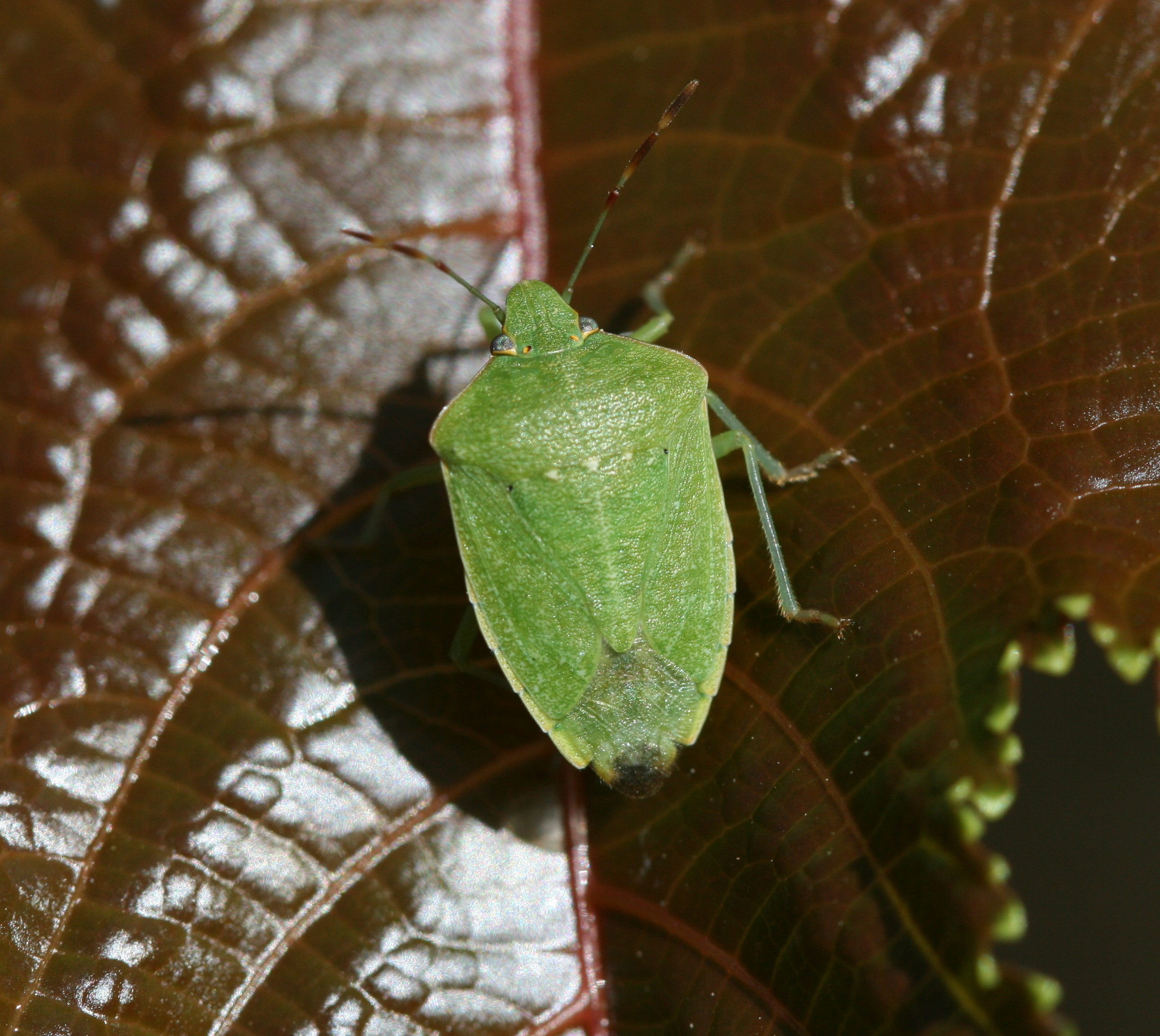
- Nezara viridula

Scientific classification
- Kingdom: Animalia
- Phylum: Arthropoda
- Clade: Pancrustacea
- Class: Insecta
- Order: Hemiptera
- Suborder: Heteroptera
- Infraorder: Pentatomomorpha
- Superfamily: Pentatomoidea
- Family: Pentatomidae; Leach, 1815

Subfamilies
- See text

= Pentatomidae =

Pentatomidae Temporal range: Paleogene–Recent

Family of insects

Pentatomidae is a family of insects belonging to the order Hemiptera, generally called shield bugs or stink bugs. Pentatomidae is the largest family in the superfamily Pentatomoidea, and contains around 900 genera and over 4700 species. As hemipterans, the pentatomids have piercing sucking mouthparts, and most are phytophagous, including several species which are severe pests on agricultural crops. However, some species, particularly in the subfamily Asopinae, are predatory and may be considered beneficial.

== Etymology ==
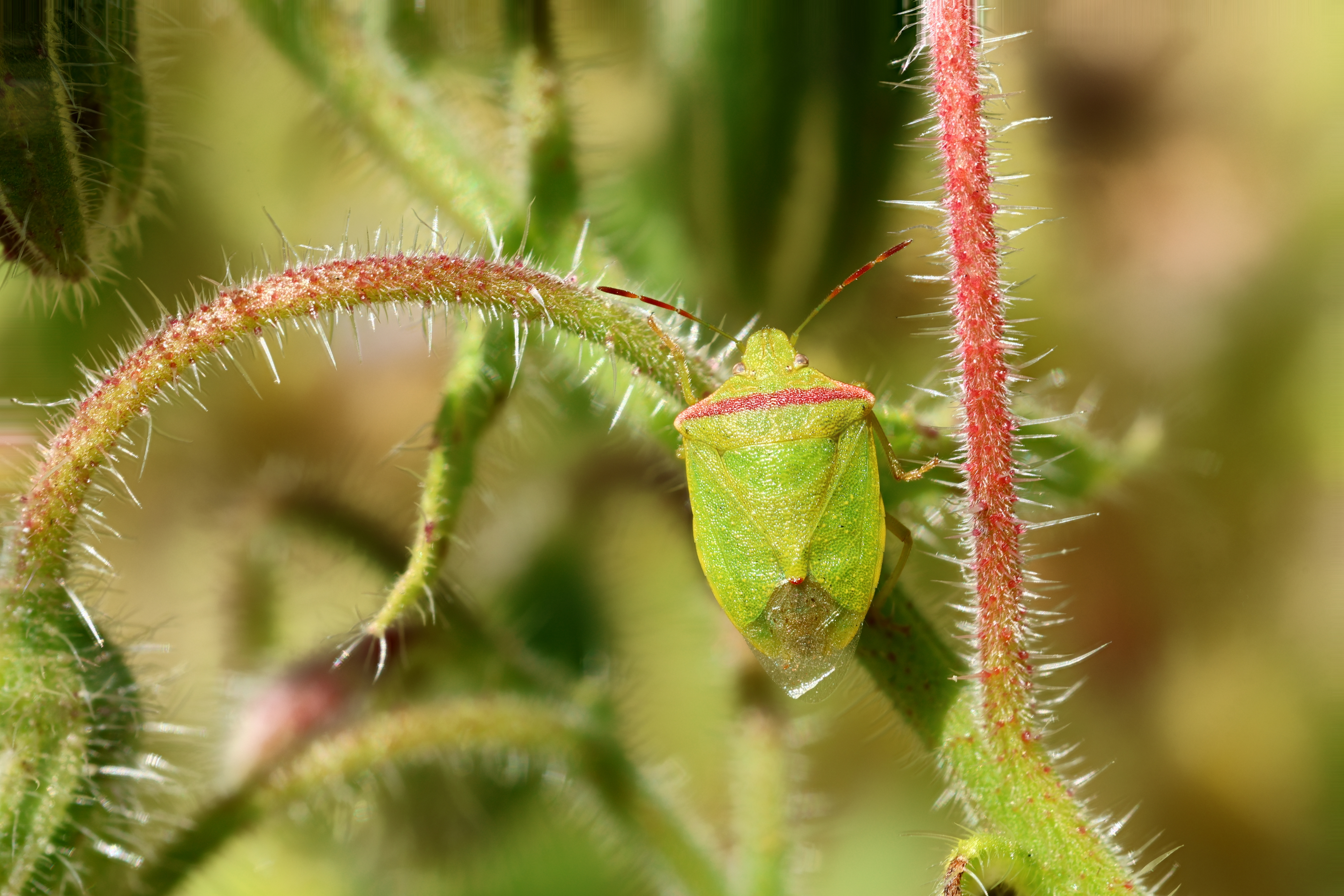
Red-shouldered stink bug

The name "Pentatomidae" is from the Greek pente meaning "five" and tomos meaning "section", and refers to the five segments of their antennae. Pentatomids are generally called "shield bugs" in British English, or "stink bugs" in American English. However, the term shield bugs is also applied broadly to include several related families (e.g. Acanthosomatidae, Scutelleridae, and Cydnidae), or specifically only to refer to species in the family Acanthosomatidae. The term shield bug refers to the generalized body shape of adult bugs in these families which resembles a heraldic shield when viewed from above.

The American name "stink bug" is specific to the Pentatomidae, and refers to their ability to release a pungent defensive spray when threatened, disturbed, or crushed. The composition of this spray may vary between species, and even by sex or age, but generally includes aldehydes and alkanes. Descriptions of the smells vary widely, and include oily, dusty, woody and earthy, and like coriander. In some species, the liquid contains cyanide compounds and a rancid almond scent, used to protect themselves and discourage predators.

The term "stink bug" may also be a vernacular for unrelated insects such as pinacate beetles (in the genus Eleodes).

== Description ==
All pentatomids have 5-segmented antennae, and 3 tarsal segments on each foot. They generally have a large triangular scutellum in the center of the back. The body shape of adult pentatomids is generally "shieldlike," when viewed from above, but this varies between species, and is not true for the immature nymphal stages. The forewings of stink bugs are called hemelytra, with the basal half thickened while the apex is membranous. At rest, the wings are laid across the back of the insect, with the membranous wingtips overlapping. The hindwings are entirely membranous. Nymphs do not have wings, but may have visible wing buds.

== Economics ==
Anatomy of the dorsal aspect of a shield bug. A: head; B: thorax; C: abdomen. 1: claws; 2: tarsus; 3: tibia; 4: femur; 8: compound eye; 9: antenna; 10: clypeus; 23: laterotergites (connexivum); 25: pronotum; 26: scutellum; 27: clavus; 28: corium; 29: embolium; 30: hemelytral membrane.

Several stink bugs and shield bugs are considered agricultural pests, because they can grow into large populations that feed on crops, damage production, and they are resistant to many pesticides. They are a threat to cotton, corn, sorghum, soybeans, native and ornamental trees, shrubs, vines, weeds, and many cultivated crops.

In Mexico, some species of stink bugs are called jumil, chinche de monte, xotlinilli, or chumil (e.g. Edessa mexicana). They are most often eaten in the states of Morelos and Guerrero. The flavor is sometimes said to resemble cinnamon, or sometimes a bitter medicinal flavor. Jumiles may be used for making sauces or as a taco filling.

Since its arrival in the U.S., the brown marmorated stink bug population has grown significantly. It was first confirmed in the U.S. in the mid-to-late 1990's in Pennsylvania. As of October 2014, brown marmorated stink bugs can be found in 41 out of 50 states within the U.S. In 2016 New Zealand's MPI put out an alert to prevent this invasive species from entering via imported cargo.

=== Pest control and management ===
Changes in winter temperatures may exacerbate the threat posed by Pentatomidae pest species. Habitats that have been identified as suitable for Pentatomidae expansion, such as the Midwest region of the United States, are likely to be heavily impacted by the increased threat. Furthermore, temperature affects life table parameters, such as survival, development, reproduction, and daily mortality, which can impact a variety of crops depending on the injury stink bugs have on them.

As the effects of climate change increase the impacts of stinkbugs on crops, improving efficacy of existing controls and developing new solutions will be critical for pest control. Chemical control programs are commonly used to manage stink bugs; however, there is evidence of increasing insecticide resistance that will decrease the efficacy of these programs over time. Alternatives to insecticides include the removal of symbionts, using traps that disrupt stinkbug vibratory communication and chemical pheromone traps.

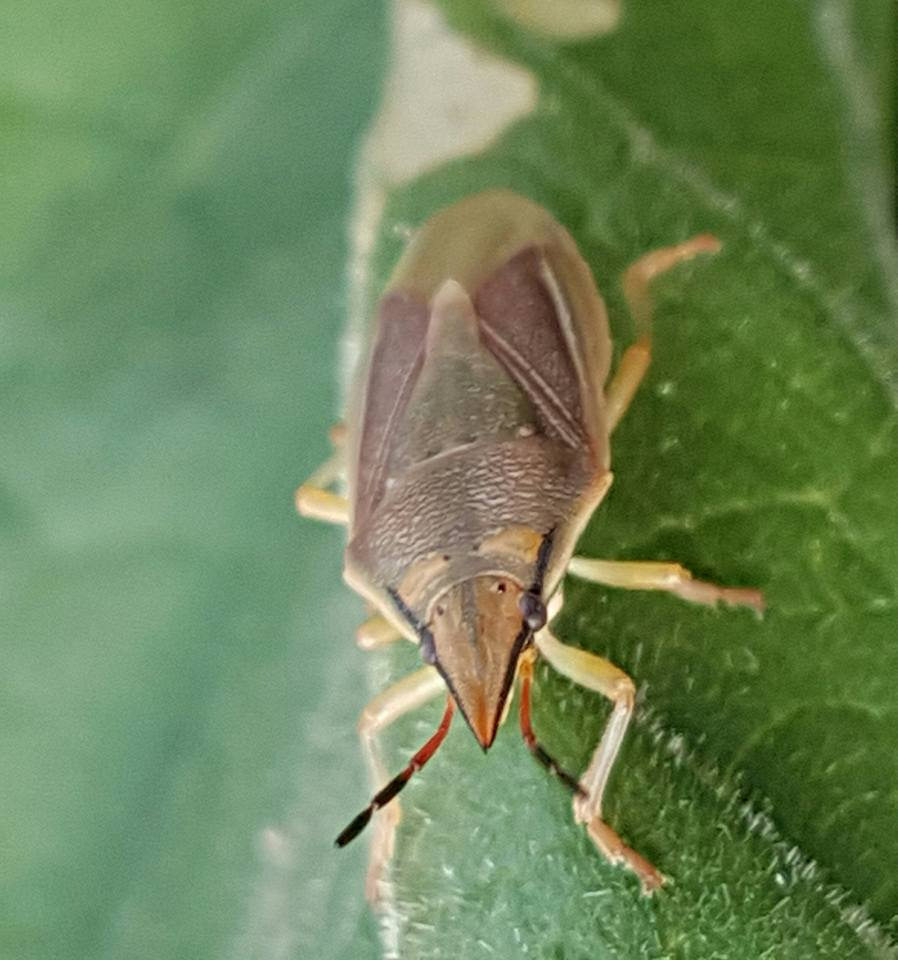
Acoloba lanceolata

== Taxonomy ==
There are several subfamilies, of which the Aphylinae is often given family status, but is here retained as a subfamily, following Grazia et al. (2008). The subfamilies include:

- Aphylinae Bergroth, 1906 – Australia
1. Aphylus Bergroth, 1906
2. Neoaphylum Štys & Davidová-Vilímová, 2001
- Asopinae Spinola, 1850 – Worldwide
  - Troilus Stål, 1868
- Cyrtocorinae Distant, 1880 – Americas
1. Ceratozygum Horváth, 1916
2. Cyphothyrea Horváth, 1916
3. Cyrtocoris White, 1842
4. Pseudocyrtocoris Jensen-Haarup, 1926
- Discocephalinae Fieber, 1860 – Americas
  - Discocephala Laporte, 1832
  - Ochlerus Spinola, 1837

=== Edessinae ===
Authority: Fieber, 1860 – Americas

1. Apheledessa Souza, Ferreira & Fernandes, 2026 – Brazilian Atlantic Forest
2. Anisoedessa Nunes & Fernandes, 2019
3. Brachystethus Laporte, 1833
4. Doesburgedessa Fernandes, 2010
5. Edessa (bug) Fabricius, 1803
6. Grammedessa Correia & Fernandes, 2016
7. Lopadusa Stål, 1860
8. Mediocampus Thomas, 1994
9. Neopharnus Van Duzee, 1910
10. Olbia (bug) Stål, 1862
11. Pantochlora Stål, 1870
12. Paraedessa Silva & Fernandes, 2013
13. Peromatus Amyot & Serville, 1843
14. Pharnus Stål, 1867
15. Plagaedessa Almeida & Fernandes, 2018
16. Platistocoris Rider, 1998
17. Praepharnus Barber & Bruner, 1932
- Pentatominae Leach, 1815 – Worldwide
  - Bathycoelia Amyot & Serville, 1843
  - Pentatoma Olivier, 1789
- Phyllocephalinae Amyot & Serville, 1843
  - Cressona Dallas, 1851
  - Megarrhamphus Bergroth, 1891
  - Phyllocephala Laporte, 1833
  - Tetroda Amyot & Serville, 1843
- Podopinae Amyot & Serville, 1843
  - Graphosoma Laporte de Castelnau, 1833
  - Podops Laporte de Castelnau, 1833
- Serbaninae (monotypic)
1. Serbana borneensis Distant, 1906
- Stirotarsinae (monotypic: South America)
1. Stirotarsus Bergroth, 1911
- incertae sedis
1. Antillosciocoris Thomas, 2005
2. Asopus Burmeister, 1834
3. Jostenicoris Arnold, 2011

=== European species ===
European species within this family include:

- Acrosternum arabicum Wagner, 1959
- Acrosternum heegeri Fieber, 1861
- Acrosternum malickyi Josifov & Heiss, 1989
- Acrosternum millierei (Mulsant & Rey, 1866)
- Acrosternum rubescens (Noualhier, 1893)
- Aelia acuminata (Linnaeus, 1758)
- Aelia albovittata Fieber, 1868
- Aelia angusta Stehlik, 1976
- Aelia cognata Fieber, 1868
- Aelia cribrosa Fieber, 1868
- Aelia furcula Fieber, 1868
- Aelia germari Kuster, 1852
- Aelia klugii Hahn, 1833
- Aelia notata Rey, 1887
- Aelia rostrata Boheman, 1852
- Aelia sibirica Reuter, 1884
- Aelia virgata (Herrich-Schäffer, 1841)
- Ancyrosoma leucogrammes (Gmelin, 1790)
- Andrallus spinidens (Fabricius, 1787)
- Antheminia absinthii (Wagner, 1952)
- Antheminia aliena (Reuter, 1891)
- Antheminia lunulata (Goeze, 1778)
- Antheminia pusio (Kolenati, 1846)
- Antheminia varicornis (Jakovlev, 1874)
- Apodiphus amygdali (Germar 1817)
- Arma custos (Fabricius, 1794)
- Arma insperata Horvath, 1899
- Asaroticus solskyi Jakovlev, 1873
- Bagrada abeillei Puton, 1881
- Bagrada confusa Horvath, 1936
- Bagrada elegans Puton, 1873
- Bagrada funerea Horvath, 1901
- Bagrada hilaris (Burmeister, 1835)
- Bagrada stolida (Herrich-Schäffer, 1839)
- Bagrada turcica Horvath, 1936
- Brachynema cinctum (Fabricius, 1775)
- Brachynema germarii (Kolenati, 1846)
- Brachynema purpureomarginatum (Rambur, 1839)
- Capnoda batesoni Jakovlev, 1889
- Carpocoris coreanus Distant, 1899
- Carpocoris fuscispinus (Boheman, 1850)
- Carpocoris melanocerus (Mulsant & Rey, 1852)
- Carpocoris pudicus (Poda, 1761)
- Carpocoris purpureipennis (De Geer, 1773)
- Chlorochroa juniperina (Linnaeus, 1758)
- Chlorochroa pinicola (Mulsant & Rey, 1852)
- Chlorochroa reuteriana (Kirkaldy, 1909)
- Chroantha ornatula (Herrich-Schäffer, 1842)
- Codophila varia (Fabricius, 1787)
- Crypsinus angustatus (Baerensprung, 1859)
- Derula flavoguttata Mulsant & Rey, 1856
- Dolycoris baccarum (Linnaeus, 1758)
- Dolycoris numidicus Horvath, 1908
- Dryadocoris apicalis (Herrich-Schäffer, 1842)
- Dybowskyia reticulata (Dallas, 1851)
- Dyroderes umbraculatus (Fabricius, 1775)
- Eudolycoris alluaudi (Noualhier, 1893)
- Eurydema cyanea (Fieber, 1864)
- Eurydema dominulus (Scopoli, 1763)
- Eurydema eckerleini Josifov, 1961
- Eurydema fieberi Schummel, 1837
- Eurydema gebleri Kolenati, 1846
- Eurydema herbacea (Herrich-Schäffer, 1833)
- Eurydema lundbaldi Lindberg, 1960
- Eurydema maracandica Oshanin, 1871
- Eurydema nana Fuente, 1971
- Eurydema oleracea (Linnaeus, 1758)
- Eurydema ornata (Linnaeus, 1758)
- Eurydema rotundicollis (Dohrn, 1860)
- Eurydema rugulosa (Dohrn, 1860)
- Eurydema sea Pericart & De la Rosa 2004
- Eurydema spectabilis Horvath, 1882
- Eurydema ventralis Kolenati, 1846
- Eysarcoris aeneus (Scopoli, 1763)
- Eysarcoris ventralis (Westwood, 1837)
- Eysarcoris venustissimus (Schrank, 1776)
- Graphosoma interruptum White, 1839
- Graphosoma italicum (Müller, 1766)
- Graphosoma lineatum (Linnaeus, 1758)
- Graphosoma melanoxanthum Horvath, 1903
- Graphosoma semipunctatum (Fabricius, 1775)
- Halyomorpha halys (Stål, 1855)
- Holcogaster fibulata (Germar 1831)
- Holcostethus albipes (Fabricius, 1781)
- Holcostethus evae Ribes, 1988
- Holcostethus sphacelatus (Fabricius, 1794)
- Jalla dumosa (Linnaeus, 1758)
- Leprosoma inconspicuum Baerensprung, 1859
- Leprosoma stali Douglas & Scott, 1868
- Leprosoma tuberculatum Jakovlev, 1874
- Macrorhaphis acuta Dallas, 1851
- Mecidea lindbergi Wagner, 1954
- Mecidea pallidissima Jensen-Haarup, 1922
- Menaccarus arenicola (Scholz, 1847)
- Menaccarus deserticola Jakovlev, 1900
- Menaccarus dohrnianus (Mulsant & Rey, 1866)
- Menaccarus turolensis Fuente, 1971
- Mustha spinosula (Lefèbvre, 1831)
- Neostrachia bisignata (Walker, 1867)
- Neottiglossa bifida (A. Costa, 1847)
- Neottiglossa flavomarginata (Lucas, 1849)
- Neottiglossa leporina (Herrich-Schäffer, 1830)
- Neottiglossa lineolata (Mulsant & Rey, 1852)
- Neottiglossa pusilla (Gmelin, 1790)
- Nezara viridula (Linnaeus, 1758)
- Palomena formosa Vidal, 1940
- Palomena prasina (Linnaeus, 1761)
- Palomena viridissima (Poda, 1761)
- Pentatoma rufipes (Linnaeus, 1758)
- Peribalus congenitus Putshkov, 1965
- Peribalus inclusus (Dohrn, 1860)
- Peribalus strictus (Fabricius, 1803)
- Perillus bioculatus (Fabricius, 1775)
- Picromerus bidens (Linnaeus, 1758)
- Picromerus brachypterus Ahmad & Onder, 1990
- Picromerus conformis (Herrich-Schäffer, 1841)
- Picromerus nigridens (Fabricius, 1803)
- Piezodorus lituratus (Fabricius, 1794)
- Piezodorus punctipes Puton, 1889
- Piezodorus teretipes (Stål, 1865)
- Pinthaeus sanguinipes (Fabricius, 1781)
- Podops annulicornis Jakovlev, 1877
- Podops calligerus Horvath, 1887
- Podops curvidens Costa, 1843
- Podops dilatatus Puton, 1873
- Podops inunctus (Fabricius, 1775)
- Podops rectidens Horvath, 1883
- Putonia torrida Stål, 1872
- Rhacognathus punctatus (Linnaeus, 1758)
- Rhaphigaster nebulosa (Poda, 1761)
- Rubiconia intermedia (Wolff, 1811)
- Schyzops aegyptiaca (Lefèbvre, 1831)
- Sciocoris angularis Puton, 1889
- Sciocoris angusticollis Puton, 1895
- Sciocoris conspurcatus Klug, 1845
- Sciocoris convexiusculus Puton, 1874
- Sciocoris cursitans (Fabricius, 1794)
- Sciocoris deltocephalus Fieber, 1861
- Sciocoris distinctus Fieber, 1851
- Sciocoris galiberti Ribaut, 1926
- Sciocoris helferi Fieber, 1851
- Sciocoris hoberlandti Wagner, 1954
- Sciocoris homalonotus Fieber, 1851
- Sciocoris luteolus Fieber, 1861
- Sciocoris macrocephalus Fieber, 1851
- Sciocoris maculatus Fieber, 1851
- Sciocoris microphthalmus Flor, 1860
- Sciocoris modestus Horvath, 1903
- Sciocoris ochraceus Fieber, 1861
- Sciocoris orientalis Linnavuori, 1960
- Sciocoris pallens Klug, 1845
- Sciocoris pentheri Wagner, 1953
- Sciocoris pictus Wagner, 1959
- Sciocoris sideritidis Wollaston, 1858
- Sciocoris sulcatus Fieber, 1851
- Sciocoris umbrinus (Wolff, 1804)
- Sciocoriscanariensis Lindberg, 1953
- Scotinophara sicula (A. Costa, 1841)
- Scotinophara subalpina (Bergroth, 1893)
- Stagonomus amoenus (Brullé, 1832)
- Stagonomus bipunctatus (Linnaeus, 1758)
- Stagonomus devius Seidenstucker, 1965
- Stagonomus grenieri (Signoret, 1865)
- Staria lunata (Hahn, 1835)
- Stenozygum coloratum (Klug, 1845)
- Sternodontus binodulus Jakovlev, 1893
- Sternodontus obtusus Mulsant & Rey, 1856
- Tarisa dimidiatipes Puton, 1874
- Tarisa elevata Reuter, 1901
- Tarisa flavescens Amyot & Serville, 1843
- Tarisa pallescens Jakovlev, 1871
- Tarisa salsolae Kerzhner, 1964
- Tarisa subspinosa (Germar 1839)
- Tholagmus flavolineatus (Fabricius, 1798)
- Tholagmus strigatus (Herrich-Schäffer, 1835)
- Trochiscocoris hemipterus (Jakovlev, 1879)
- Trochiscocoris rotundatus Horvath, 1895
- Troilus luridus (Fabricius, 1775)
- Ventocoris achivus (Horvath, 1889)
- Ventocoris falcatus (Cyrillus, 1791)
- Ventocoris fischeri (Herrich-Schäffer, 1851)
- Ventocoris halophilum (Jakovlev, 1874)
- Ventocoris modestus (Jakovlev, 1880)
- Ventocoris philalyssum (Kiritshenko, 1916)
- Ventocoris ramburi (Horvath, 1908)
- Ventocoris rusticus (Fabricius, 1781)
- Ventocoris trigonus (Krynicki, 1871)
- Vilpianus galii (Wolff, 1802)
- Zicrona caerulea (Linnaeus, 1758)
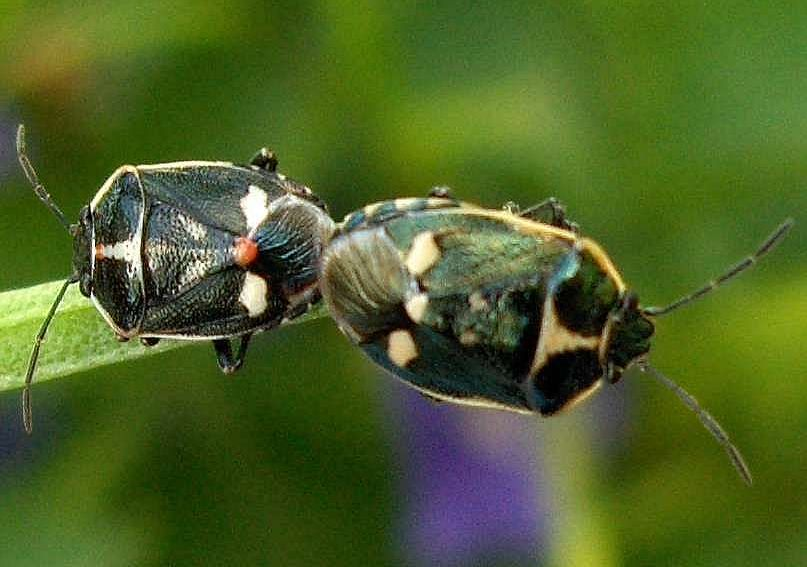
Eurydema oleracea

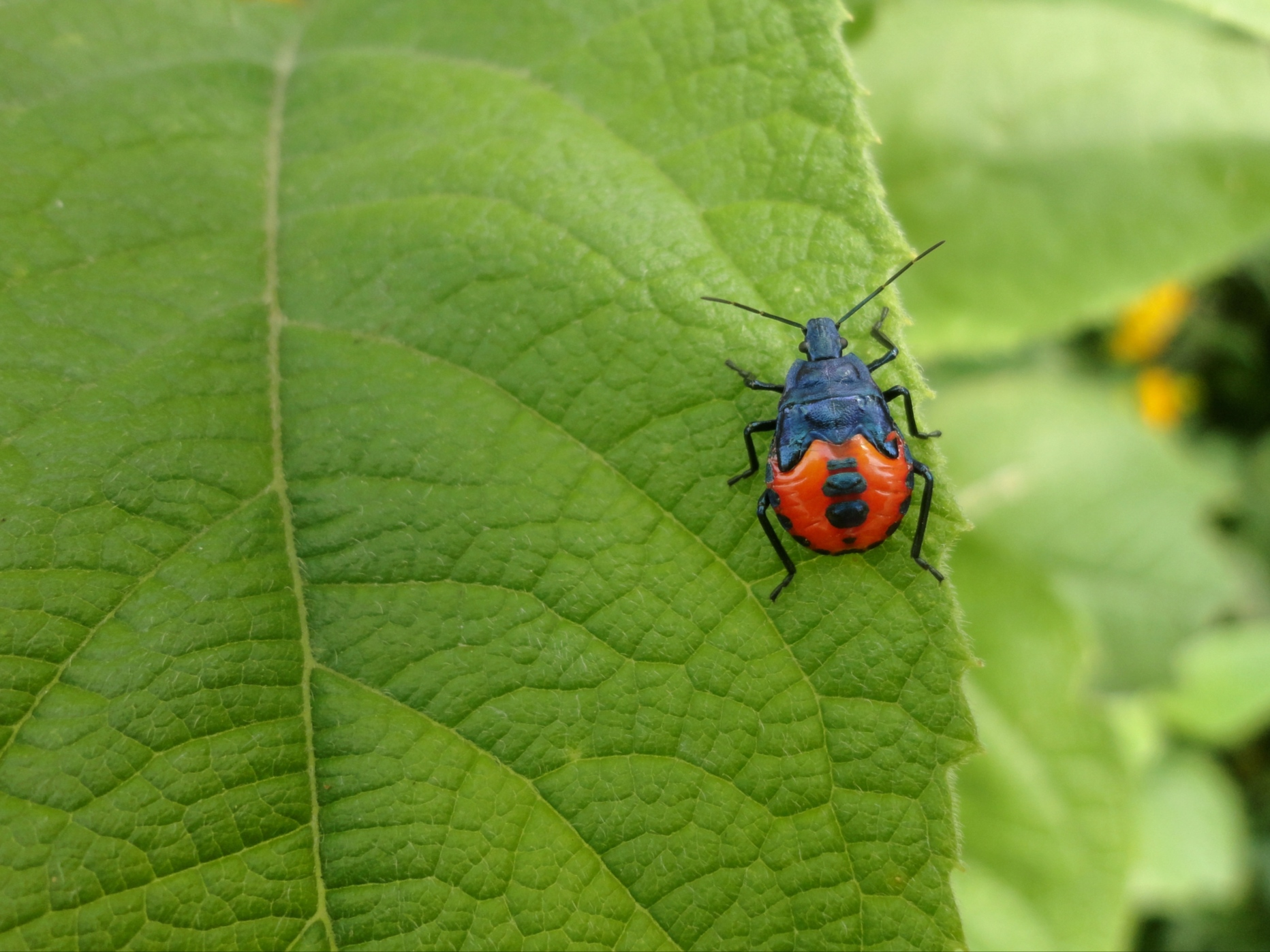
Euthyrhynchus floridanus, nymph

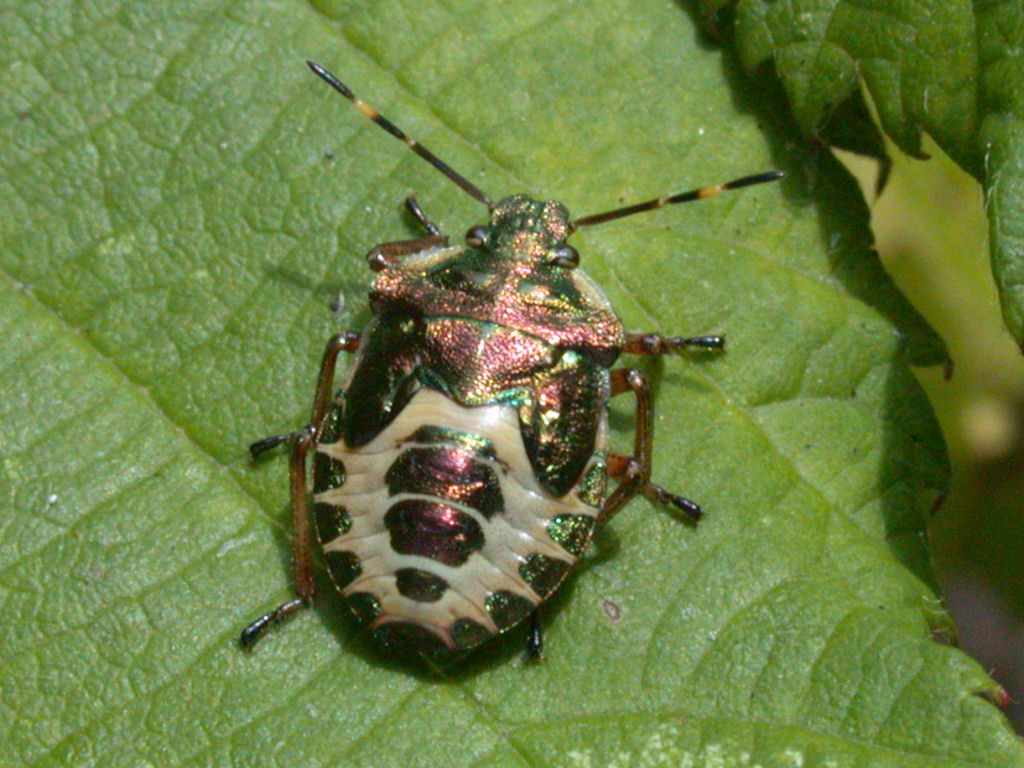
Troilus luridus

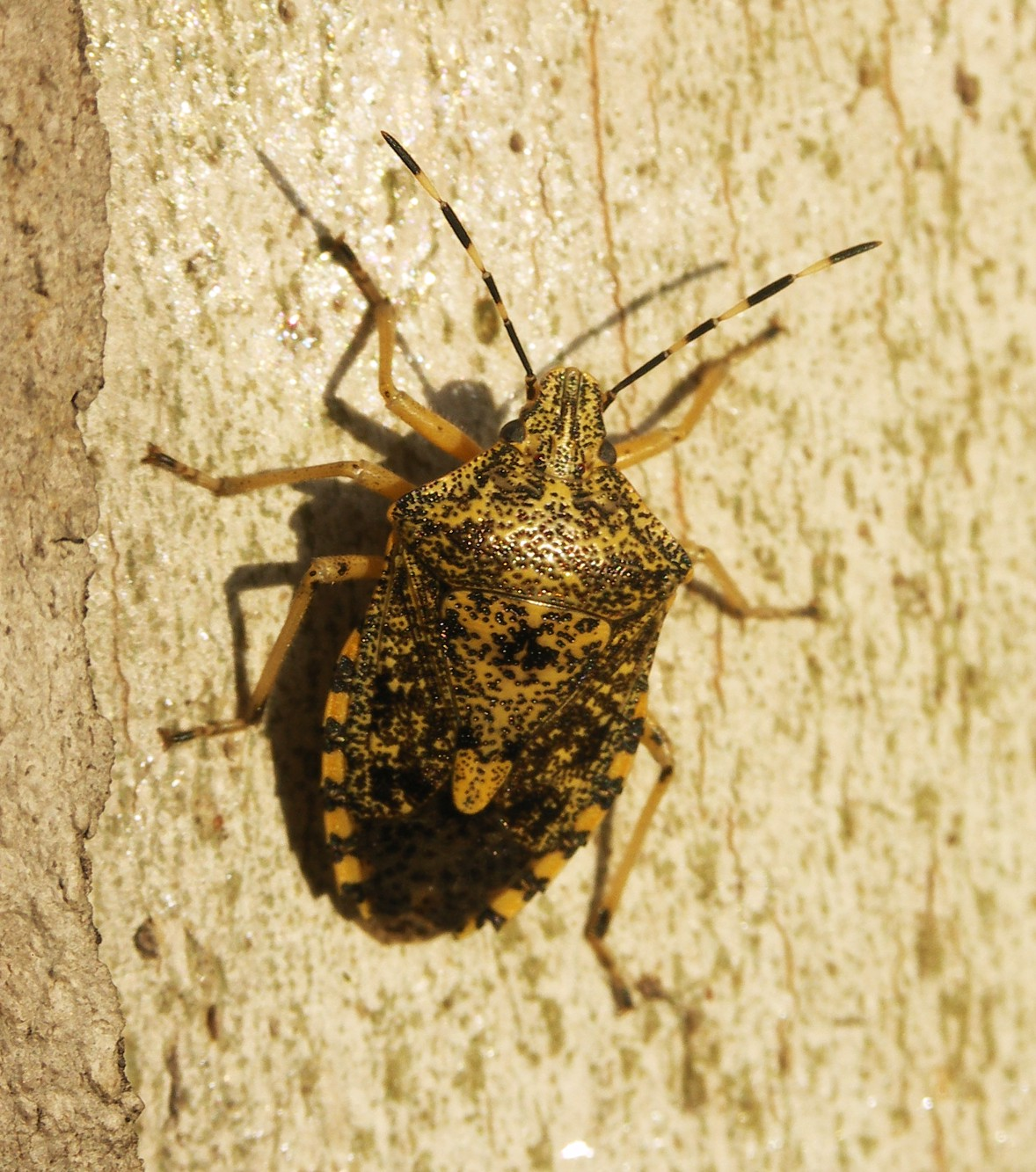
Raphigaster nebulosa

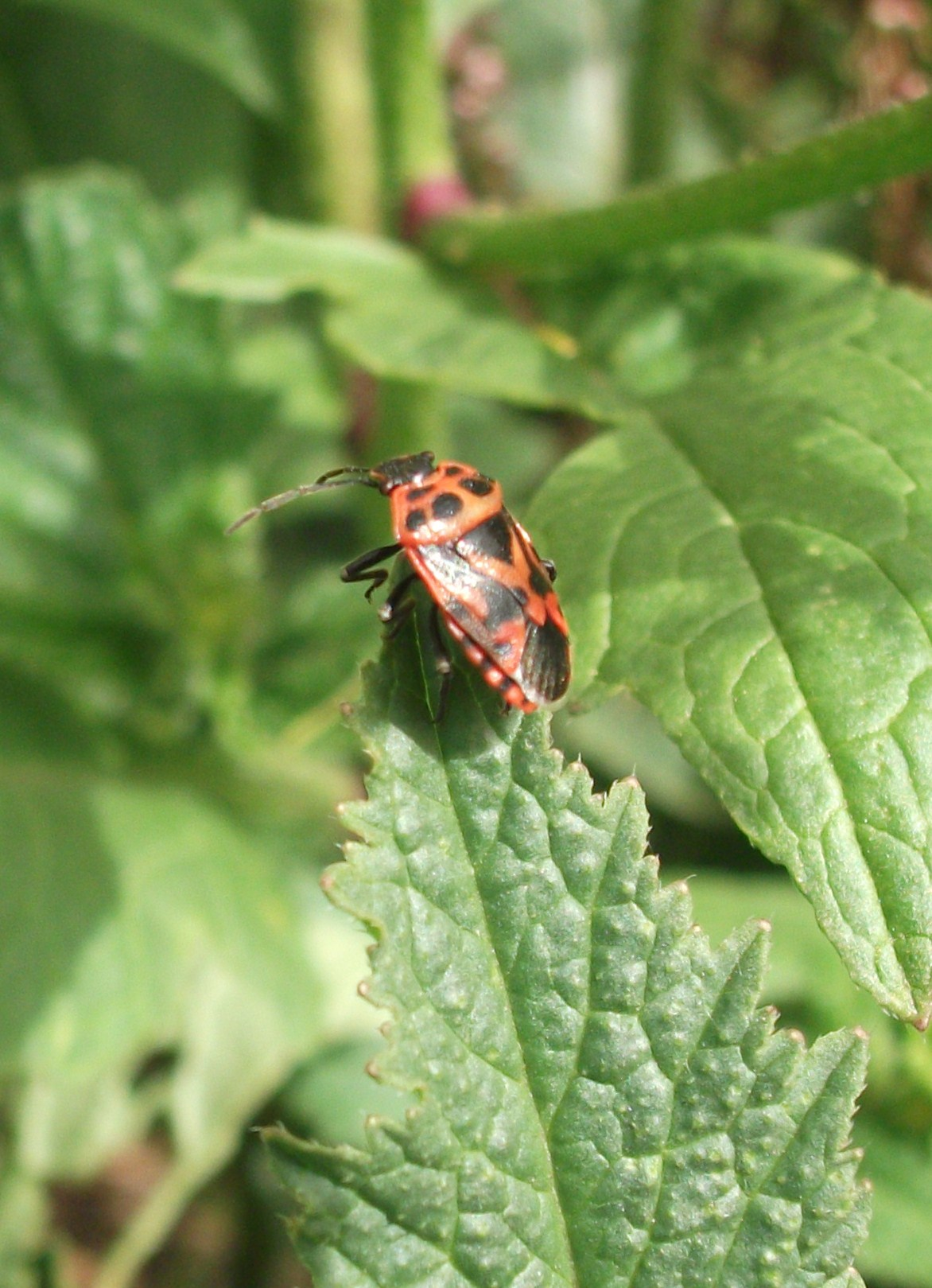
Eurydema ornatum

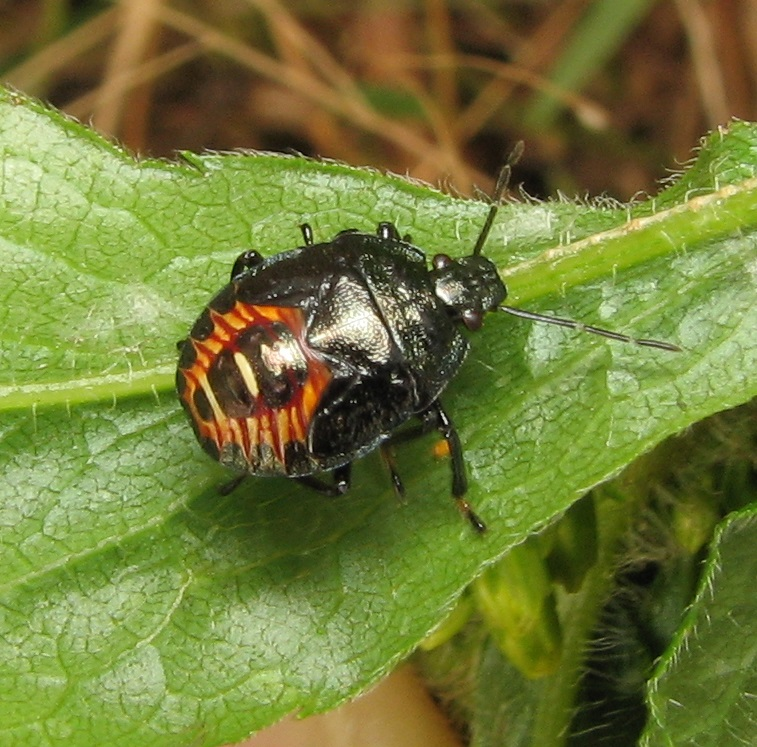
Perillus, nymph

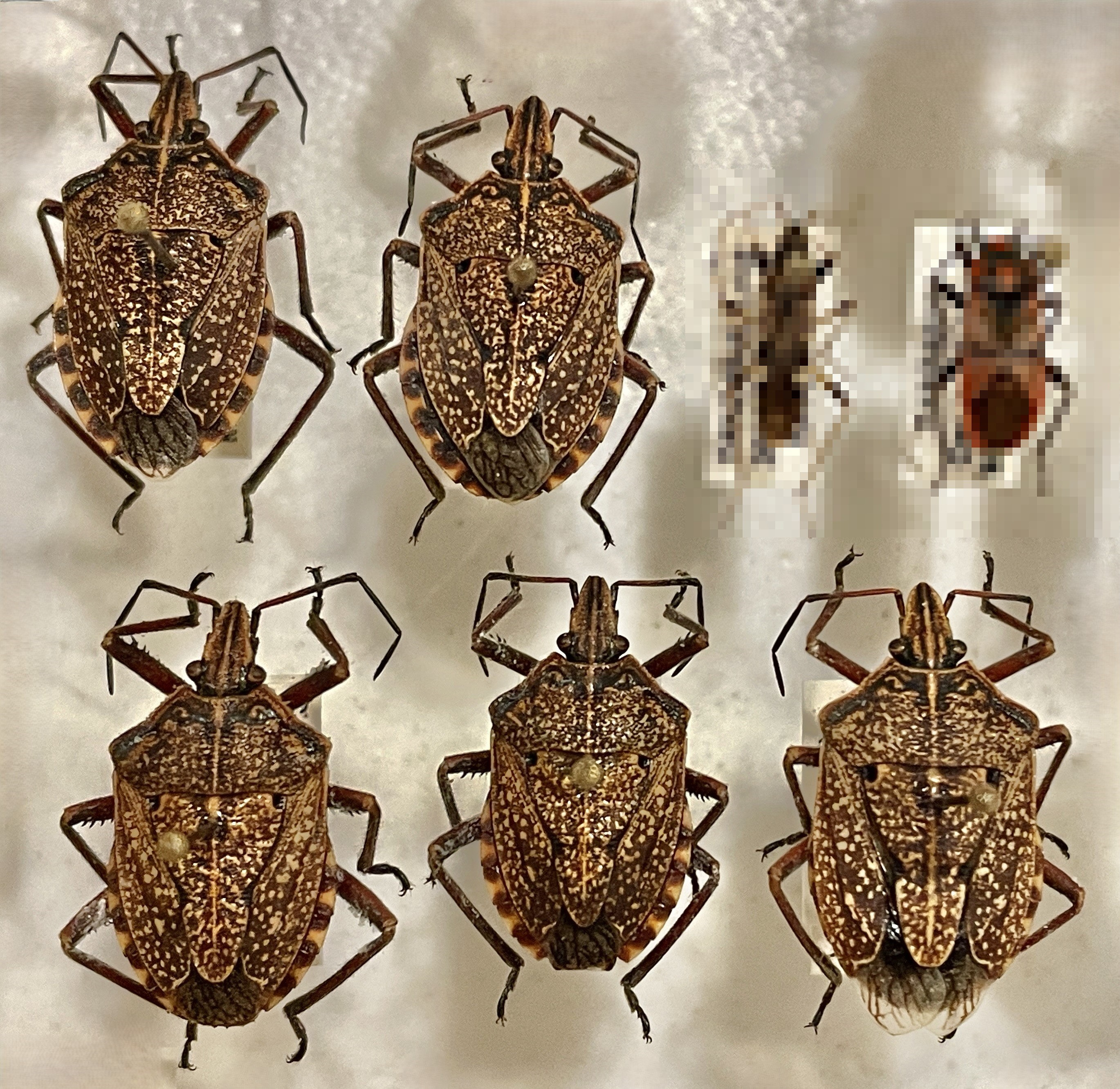
Atelocera serrata

== See also ==
- List of Pentatomidae genera
- Chinavia hilaris, the green stink bug
- Alcaeorrhynchus grandis
- Cosmopepla lintneriana, the twice-stabbed stink bug
- Halyomorpha halys, the brown marmorated stink bug
- Oebalus pugnax, the rice stink bug
- Euthyrhynchus floridanus, the Florida predatory stink bug
