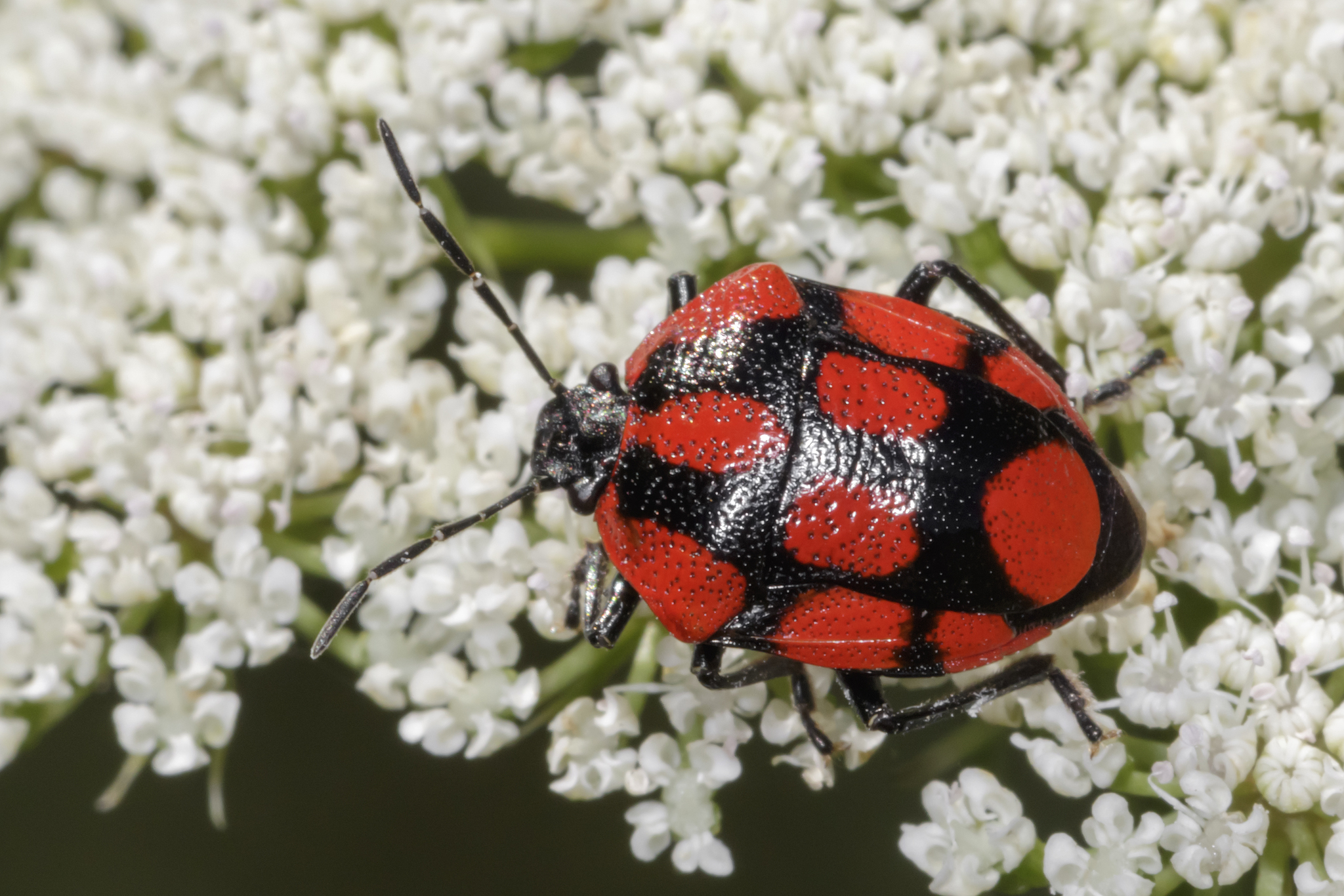

Scientific classification
- Domain: Eukaryota
- Kingdom: Animalia
- Phylum: Arthropoda
- Class: Insecta
- Order: Hemiptera
- Suborder: Heteroptera
- Family: Pentatomidae
- Genus: Stiretrus
- Species: S. decastigmus

Binomial name
- Stiretrus decastigmus Herrich-Schäffer, 1838

= Stiretrus decastigmus =

Insect

Stiretrus decastigmus is a species of insect found in South America, including the countries of Argentina, Bolivia, Brazil, and Paraguay. It is a predator of the insect pests from the genus Microtheca, including Microtheca ochroloma, and has been reared in laboratories for possible use in biological pest control.
