= Microtheca =

Microtheca can mean:

- Microtheca (beetle), a genus of leaf beetles
- Microtheca (mollusc), a synonym of the gastropod mollusc genus Microthyca
- Microtheca (alga), a genus of diatoms.
- Microtheca (plant), a synonym for the orchid genus Cynorkis
