= Rhacognathus americanus =

Scientific classification
- Kingdom: Animalia
- Phylum: Arthropoda
- Clade: Pancrustacea
- Class: Insecta
- Order: Hemiptera
- Suborder: Heteroptera
- Family: Pentatomidae
- Genus: Rhacognathus
- Species: R. americanus

Binomial name
- Rhacognathus americanus Stål, 1870

Species of true bug

Rhacognathus americanus is a species of predatory stink bug in the subfamily Asopinae first described by Carl Stål in 1870. It is native to North America, but may be extinct.

== Description and biology ==
The adults are large (9–11 mm) predaceous stinkbugs, usually dark brown black mottled with dull yellow. Historically it has been rarely encountered, therefore nothing about its life history is known.

== Distribution and current status ==
There were less than 40 verifiable sightings of this species in the 20th century, mostly in the Great Lakes region and the Prairies. No individual has been collected or seen since 1966, despite the increased use of citizen science projects such as iNaturalist and recent stinkbug monitoring projects (largely to target the brown marmorated stink bug). The species is likely extirpated from Ontario, and may even be extinct.
