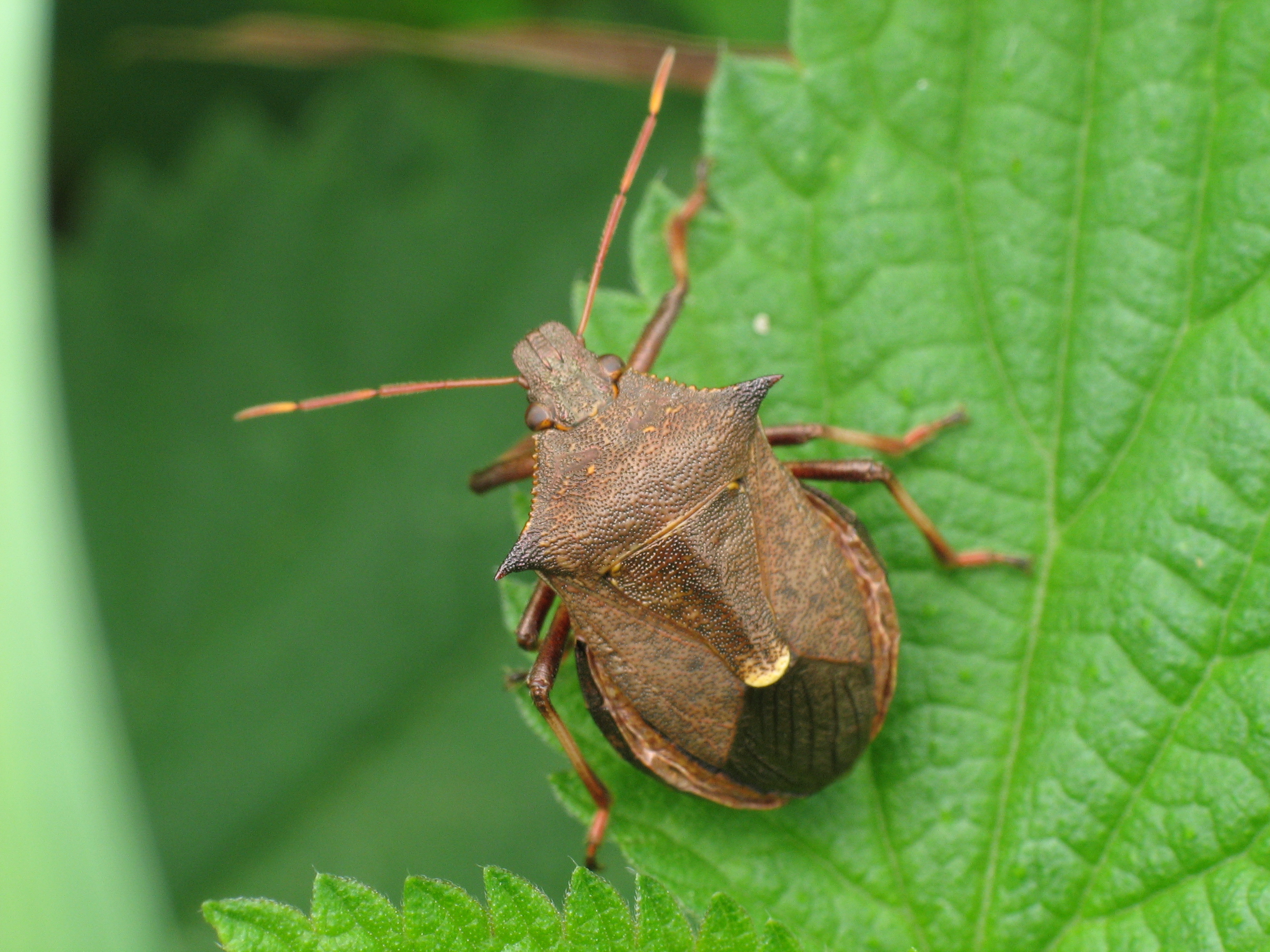
- Picromerus bidens

Scientific classification
- Kingdom: Animalia
- Phylum: Arthropoda
- Clade: Pancrustacea
- Class: Insecta
- Order: Hemiptera
- Suborder: Heteroptera
- Family: Pentatomidae
- Subfamily: Asopinae; Spinola, 1850

= Asopinae =

Subfamily of true bugs

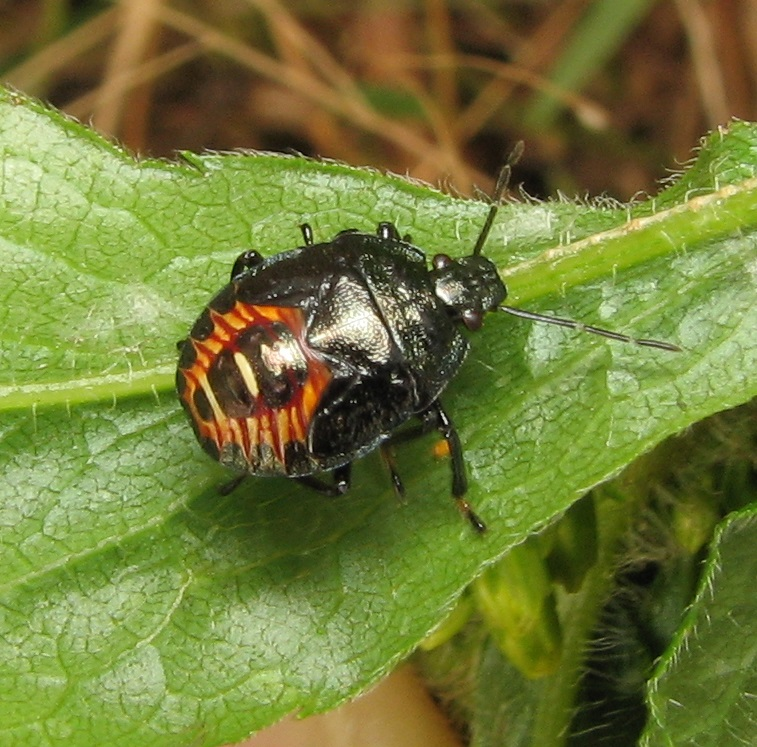
Perillus sp. nymph

Asopinae are a subfamily of stink bugs (family Pentatomidae). They are predatory stink bugs that are useful as biological control agents against pests, even against other herbivorous Pentatomid species. Despite being predatory, the rostrum is similarly straw-like as herbivorous Pentatomids. Their diet usually consists of soft-bodied insects like caterpillars and beetle larvae.

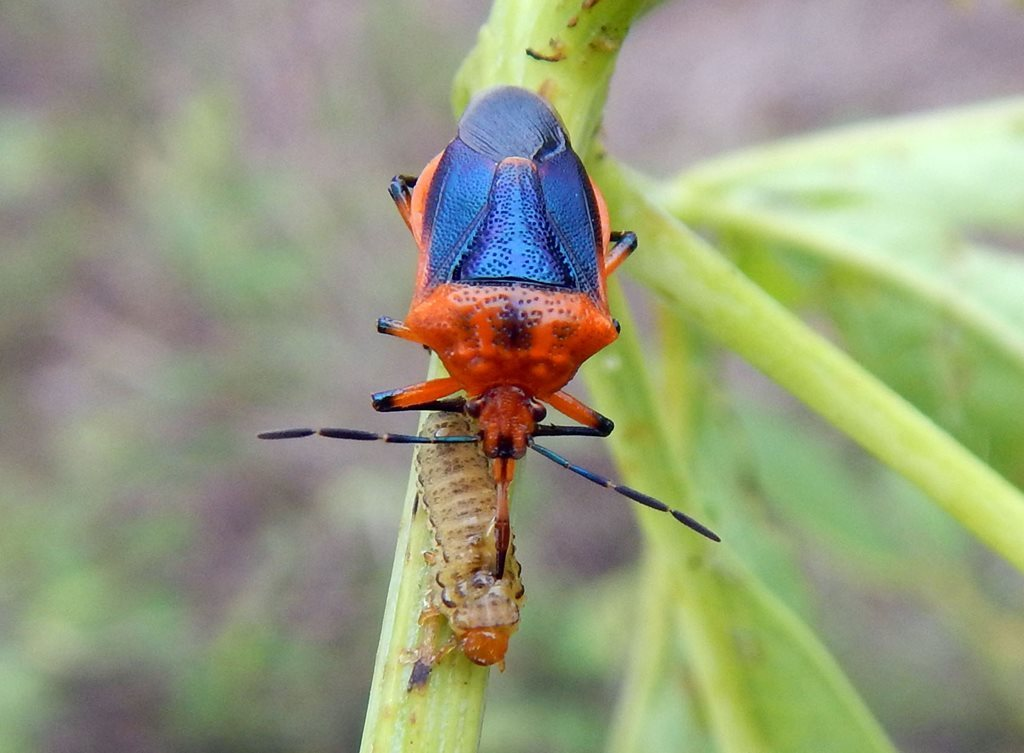
Jalloides opulentus preying on beetle larva

== Genera ==
1. Afrius Stål, 1870 (Syn. Subafrius)
2. Alcaeorrhynchus Bergoth, 1891 (Syn. Mutyca)
3. Amyotea Ellenrieder, 1862
4. Anasida Karsch, 1892
5. Andrallus Bergroth, 1906 (Syn. Audinetia)
6. Apateticus Dallas, 1851
7. Apoecilus Stål, 1870
8. Arma (insect) Hahn, 1832
9. Australojalla Thomas, 1994
10. Blachia (insect) Walker, 1867 (Syn. Sesha)
11. Brontocoris
12. Bulbostethus
13. Canthecona
14. Cantheconidea
15. Cazira (Syn. Acicazira, Breddiniella, Metacazira, Teratocazira)
16. Cecyrina
17. Cermatulus
18. Colpothyreus
19. Comperocoris
20. Coryzorhaphis (Syn. Gilva)
21. Damarius
22. Dinorhynchus (Syn. Neoglypsus)
23. Discocera (insect) Laporte, 1833 (Syn. Asopus, Acanthodiscocera, Paradiscocera)
24. Dorycoris Mayr, 1864 (Syn. Claudia)
25. Ealda Walker, 1867
26. Eocanthecona Bergroth, 1915
27. Euthyrhynchus Dallas, 1851
28. Friarius Schouteden, 1907
29. Glypsus Dallas, 1851 (Syn. Cataglypsus, Epiglypsus, Paraglypsus)
30. Hemallia (Syn. Allia)
31. Heteroscelis (Syn. Agerrus, Bodetria, Heterosceloides)
32. Hoploxys
33. Jalla Hahn, 1832
34. Jalloides Schouteden, 1907
35. Leptolobus (Syn. Moyara)
36. Macrorhaphis Dallas, 1851
37. Marmessulus (Syn. Marmessus)
38. Martinina Schouteden, 1907 (Syn. Martinia, Incitatus)
39. Mecosoma
40. Megarhaphis
41. Mineus
42. Montrouzieriellus (Syn. Acanthomera, Heteropus)
43. Oechalia (Syn. Hawaiicola)
44. Oplomus (Syn. Catostyrax, Polypoecilus, Stictocnemis)
45. Ornithosoma
46. Parajalla (Syn. Neojalla)
47. Parealda
48. Perillus Stål, 1862 (Syn. Gordonerius, Perilloides)
49. Picromerus Amyot & Serville, 1843
50. Pinthaeus Stål, 1867
51. Planopsis
52. Platynopiellus
53. Platynopus
54. Podisus Herrich-Schäffer, 1851 (Syn. Eupodisus, Telepta)
55. Ponapea
56. Pseudanasida
57. Rhacognathus Fieber, 1860
58. Stiretrus (Syn. Karaibocoris, Oncogaster, Stictocoris, Stictonotion, Stictonotus, Stiretroides, Stiretrosoma)
59. Supputius Distant, 1889
60. Troilus Stål, 1867
61. Tylospilus Stål, 1870
62. Tynacantha Dallas, 1851
63. Tyrannocoris Thomas, 1992
64. Zicrona Amyot & Serville, 1843
