= Martinina =

Scientific classification
- Kingdom: Animalia
- Phylum: Arthropoda
- Class: Insecta
- Order: Hemiptera
- Suborder: Heteroptera
- Family: Pentatomidae
- Subfamily: Asopinae
- Genus: Martinina; Schouteden, 1907

Synonyms
- Martinia Schouteden, 1907; Incitatus Distant, 1908

Genus of true bugs

Martinina is a genus of shield bugs in the subfamily Asopinae, erected by Henri Schouteden in 1907.

== Species ==
BioLib includes:

1. Martinina inexpectata (Schouteden, 1907)
2. Martinina prima (Distant, 1908)
