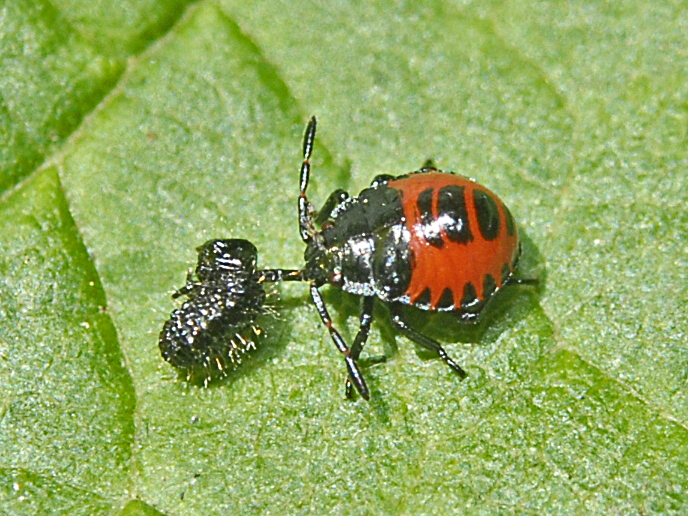
- Nymph of Zicrona caerulea preying a larva

Scientific classification
- Domain: Eukaryota
- Kingdom: Animalia
- Phylum: Arthropoda
- Class: Insecta
- Order: Hemiptera
- Suborder: Heteroptera
- Family: Pentatomidae
- Subfamily: Asopinae
- Genus: Zicrona; Amyot & Serville 1843

= Zicrona =

Genus of true bugs

Zicrona is a genus of bugs of the family Pentatomidae. It was circumscribed by Charles Jean-Baptiste Amyot and Jean Guillaume Audinet-Serville

Amyot and Serville wrote the genus's name comes from the Hebrew word זכרון (zicron) meaning "odorant".

== Species ==
As of 2017, the following four species are recognized:

- Zicrona americana Thomas, 1992
- Zicrona caerulea (Linnaeus, 1758) - Blue Bug
- Zicrona hisarensis Chopra & Sucheta, 1984
- Zicrona murreensis Rana & Ahmad, 1988
