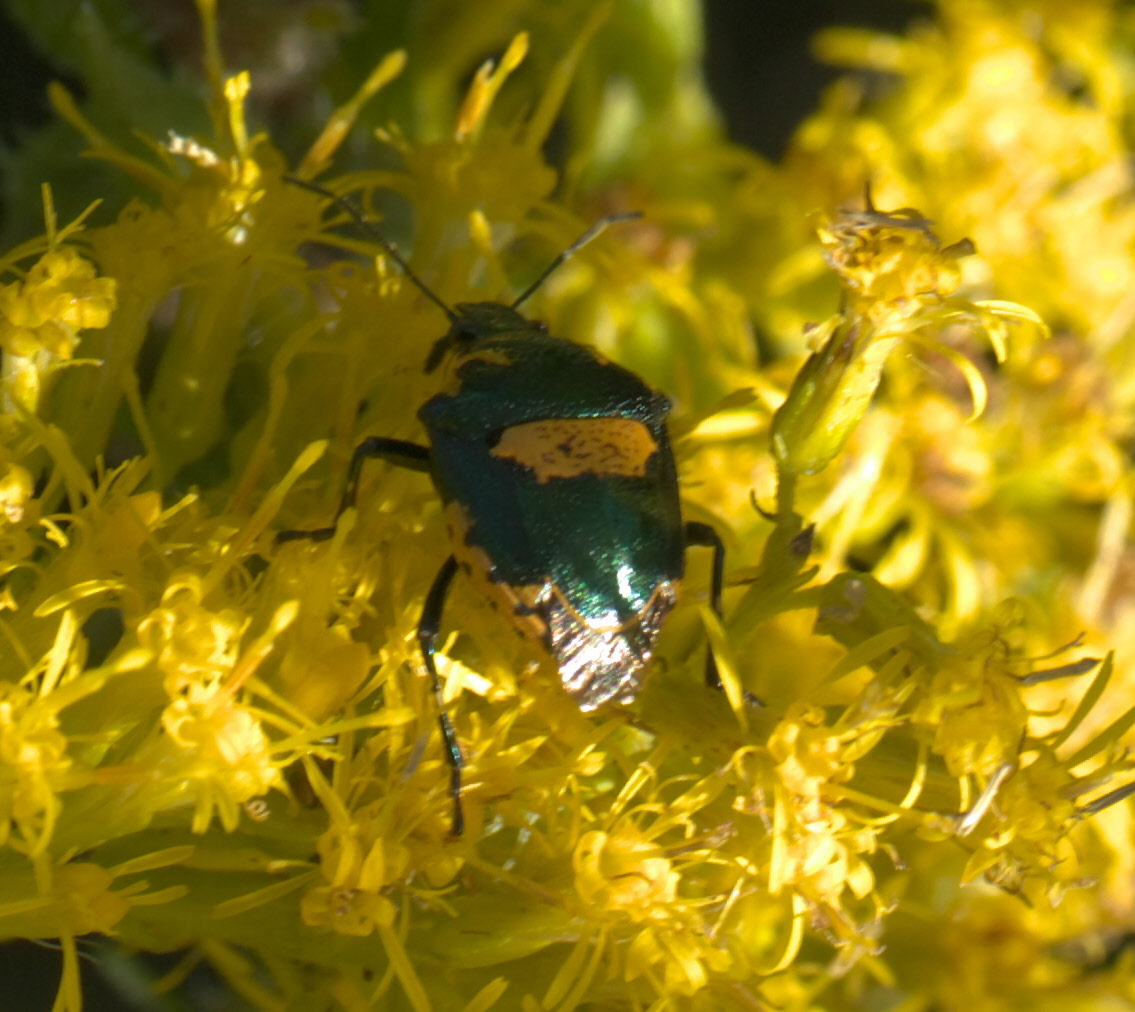

Scientific classification
- Kingdom: Animalia
- Phylum: Arthropoda
- Clade: Pancrustacea
- Class: Insecta
- Order: Hemiptera
- Suborder: Heteroptera
- Family: Pentatomidae
- Genus: Stiretrus
- Species: S. anchorago

Binomial name
- Stiretrus anchorago (Fabricius, 1775)

= Stiretrus anchorago =

Species of true bug

Stiretrus anchorago, commonly known as the anchor stink bug, is a species of predatory stink bug in the family Pentatomidae. It is found in Central America and North America. It is known to prey upon Epilachna varivestis and Hypera postica. Markings on this species are highly variable.

== Subspecies ==
These five subspecies belong to the species Stiretrus anchorago:

- Stiretrus anchorago anchorago (Fabricius, 1775)^{i c g}
- Stiretrus anchorago diana (Fabricius, 1803)^{i c g}
- Stiretrus anchorago fimbriatus (Say, 1828)^{i c g}
- Stiretrus anchorago personatus Germar, 1839^{i c g}
- Stiretrus anchorago violaceus (Say, 1828)^{i c g}

Data sources: i = ITIS, c = Catalogue of Life, g = GBIF, b = Bugguide.net
