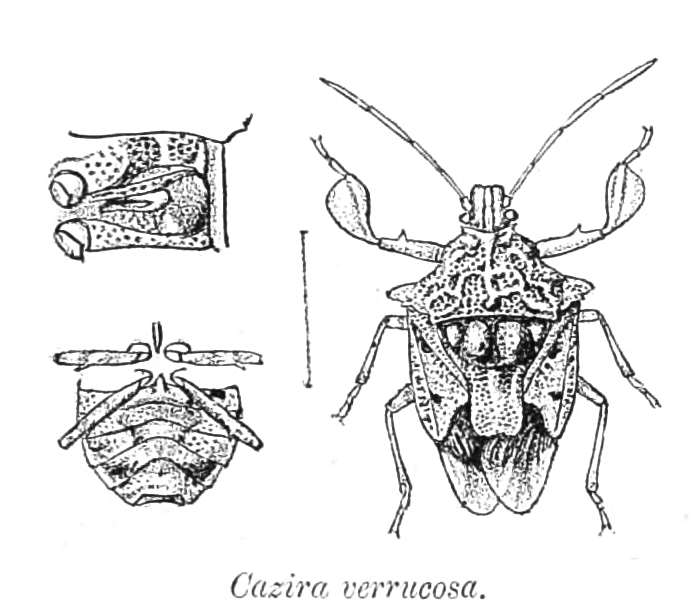
- Cazira verrucosa

Scientific classification
- Kingdom: Animalia
- Phylum: Arthropoda
- Class: Insecta
- Order: Hemiptera
- Suborder: Heteroptera
- Family: Pentatomidae
- Subfamily: Asopinae
- Genus: Cazira; Amyot & Serville, 1843

Type species
- Cazira verrucosa

Synonyms
- Breddiniella

= Cazira =

Genus of true bugs

Cazira is a genus of shield bugs found in the Indo-Malayan region.

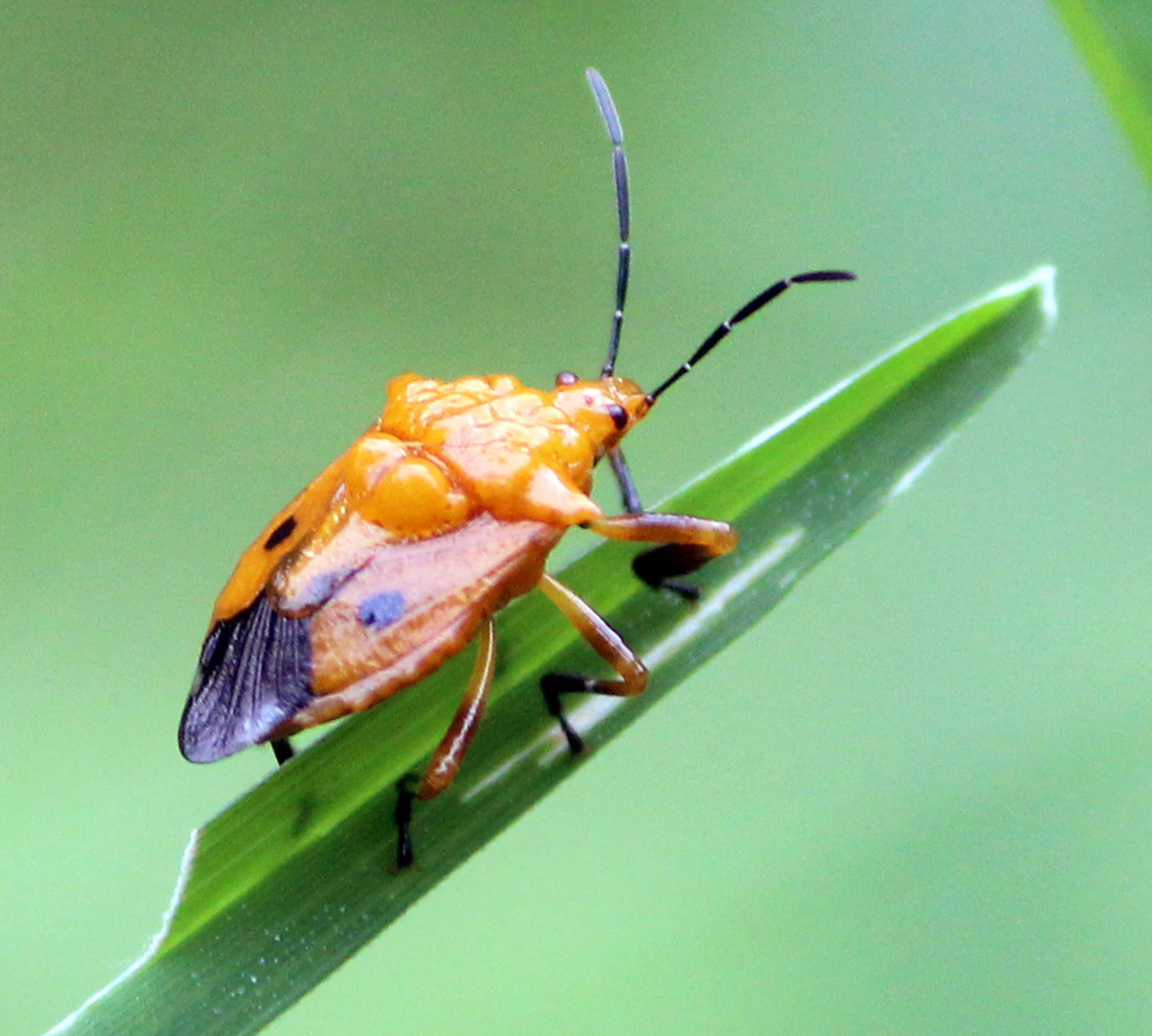
Cazira sp. from Kerala

The antennae have five joints and the basal segment does not reach the tip of the head. The pronotum is rugose and the scutellum has inflated tuberculations on it. The fore tibiae are dilated and on the underside the abdomen has an abdominal spine that reaches the hind coxae.

About fifteen species are known in the genus.

== Species ==
- Cazira breddini Schouteden, 1907 - Vietnam, Sichuan, Bhutan
- Cazira concinna Hsiao & Cheng, 1977 - Hainan
- Cazira emeia Zhang & Lin, 1982 - Yunnan
- Cazira flava Yang, 1935 - Yunnan
- Cazira friwaldskyi Horvath, 1889 - Himalayas (= Cazira bhoutanica Schouteden, 1907)
- Cazira inerma Yang, 1935 - Sichuan, Fujian, Zhejiang
- Cazira membrania Zhang & Lin, 1982 - Guizhou, Zhejiang
- Cazira montandoni Breddin, 1903 - Yunnan, Vietnam
- Cazira sichuana Zhang & Lin, 1986 - Sichuan
- Cazira similis Distant, 1902 - Northeast India
- Cazira thibetensis Schouteden, 1907 - Sichuan, Yunnan
- Cazira ulceratus (Burmeister, 1835) - Java, Sumatra (= Cazira vegeta Kirkaldy, 1909) - India, Thailand, Japan
- Cazira verrucosa (Westwood, 1835) - South Asia, Thailand
- Cazira yunnanica (Zhang & Lin, 1982) - Yunnan (earlier under Breddiniella)
