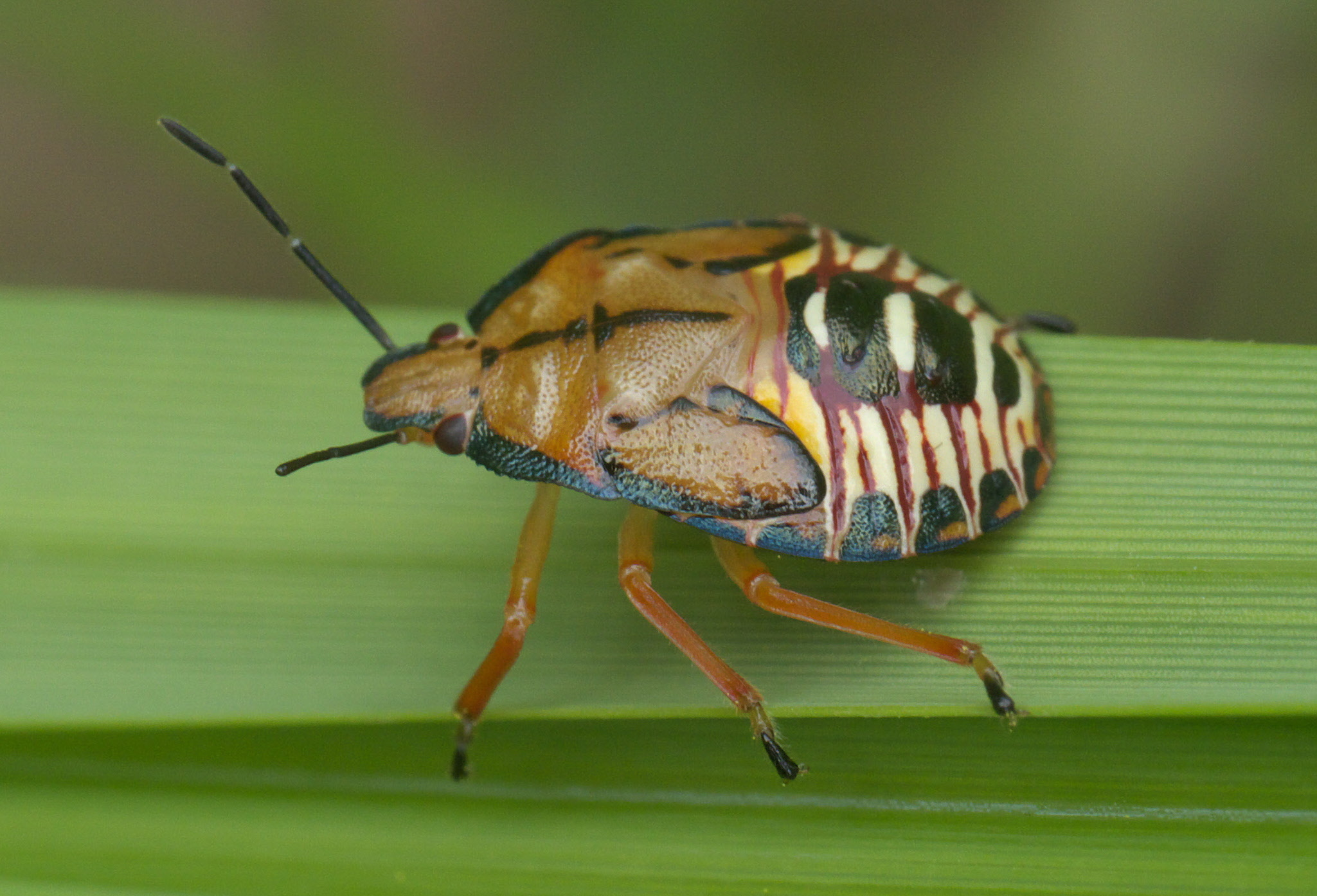

Scientific classification
- Domain: Eukaryota
- Kingdom: Animalia
- Phylum: Arthropoda
- Class: Insecta
- Order: Hemiptera
- Suborder: Heteroptera
- Family: Pentatomidae
- Subfamily: Asopinae
- Genus: Podisus; Herrich-Schaeffer, 1851

= Podisus =

Genus of true bugs

Podisus is a genus of predatory stink bugs in the family Pentatomidae. There are at least 20 described species in Podisus.

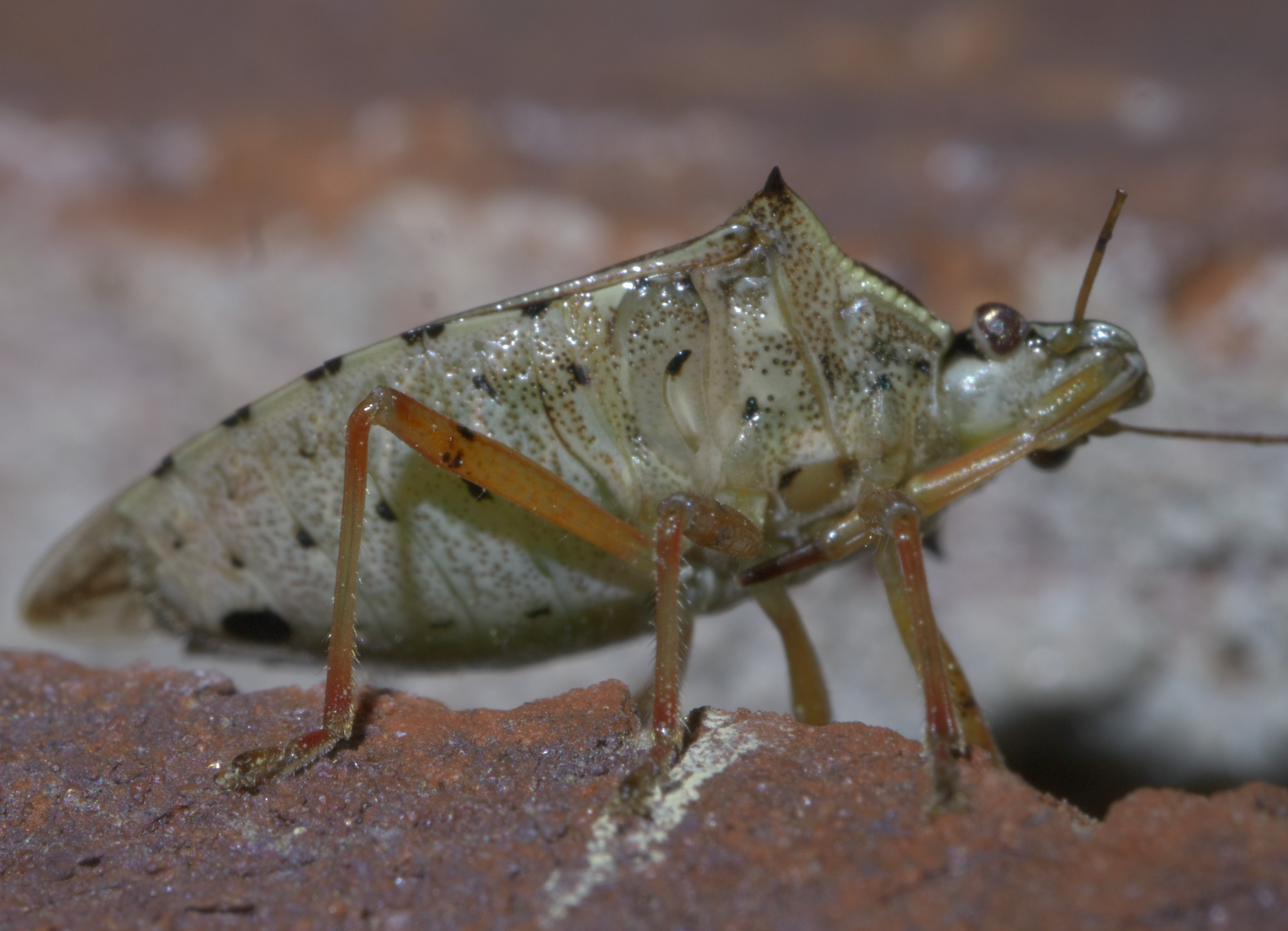

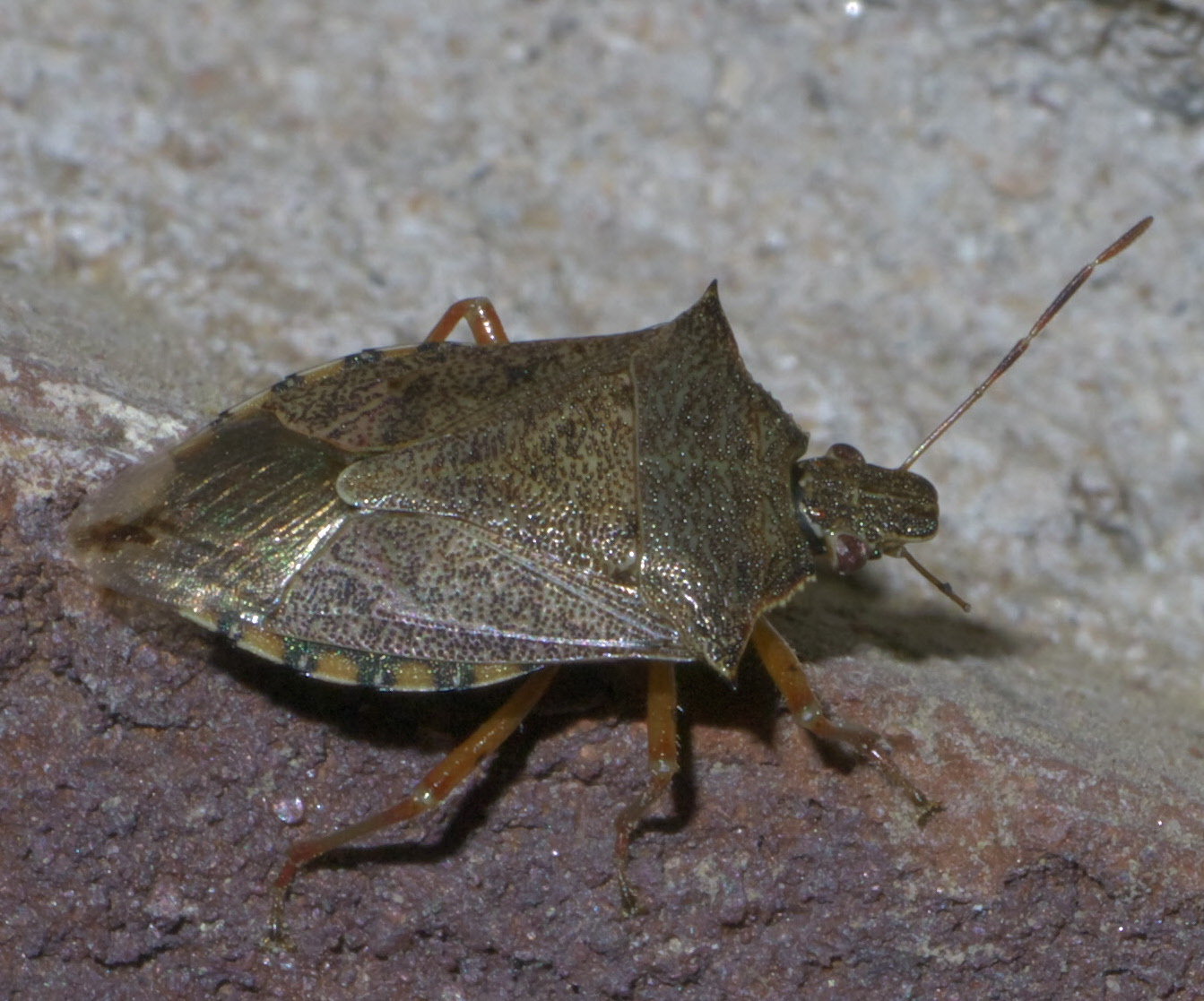

== Species ==
These 20 species belong to the genus Podisus:

- Podisus aenescens (Stål, 1860)
- Podisus australis Berg, 1879
- Podisus borinquensis Barber
- Podisus brevispinus Phillips, 1982
- Podisus distinctus (Stål, 1860)
- Podisus fretus Olsen, 1916
- Podisus fuscescens (Dallas, 1851)
- Podisus gillettei Uhler
- Podisus jole (Stål, 1862)
- Podisus maculiventris (Say, 1832) (spined soldier bug)
- Podisus modestus (Dallas, 1851)
- Podisus mucronatus Uhler, 1897
- Podisus neglectus
- Podisus nigrispinus (Dallas, 1851)
- Podisus placidus Uhler, 1870
- Podisus sagitta (Fabricius, 1794)
- Podisus serieventris Uhler, 1871
- Podisus sigitta (Fabricius, 1794)
- Podisus subferrugineus Barber & Bruner
- Podisus vittipennis Herrich-Schaeffer, 1851
