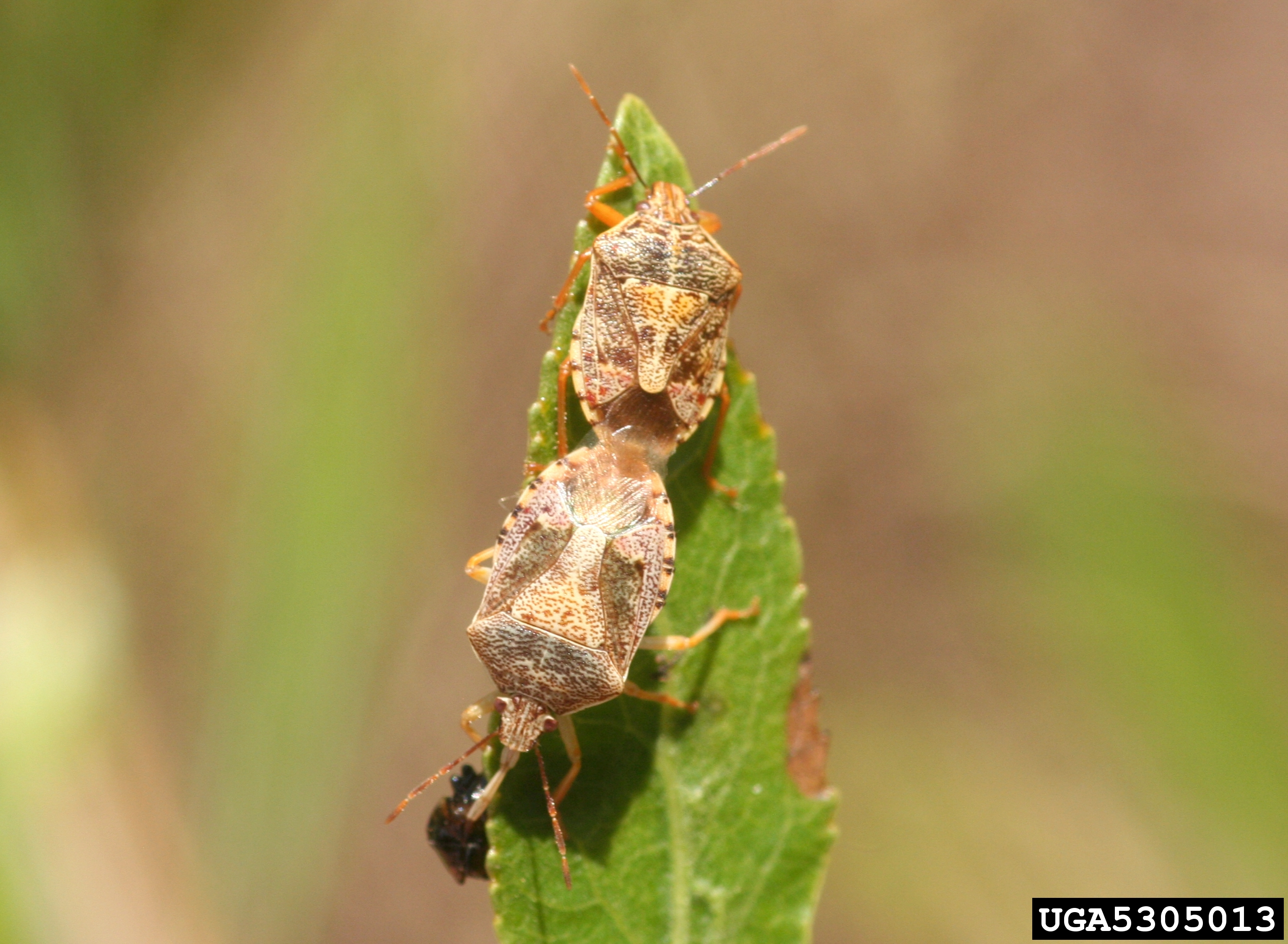

Scientific classification
- Domain: Eukaryota
- Kingdom: Animalia
- Phylum: Arthropoda
- Class: Insecta
- Order: Hemiptera
- Suborder: Heteroptera
- Family: Pentatomidae
- Genus: Podisus
- Species: P. placidus

Binomial name
- Podisus placidus Uhler, 1870

= Podisus placidus =

Species of true bug

Podisus placidus is a species of predatory stink bug in the family Pentatomidae. It is found in North America.
