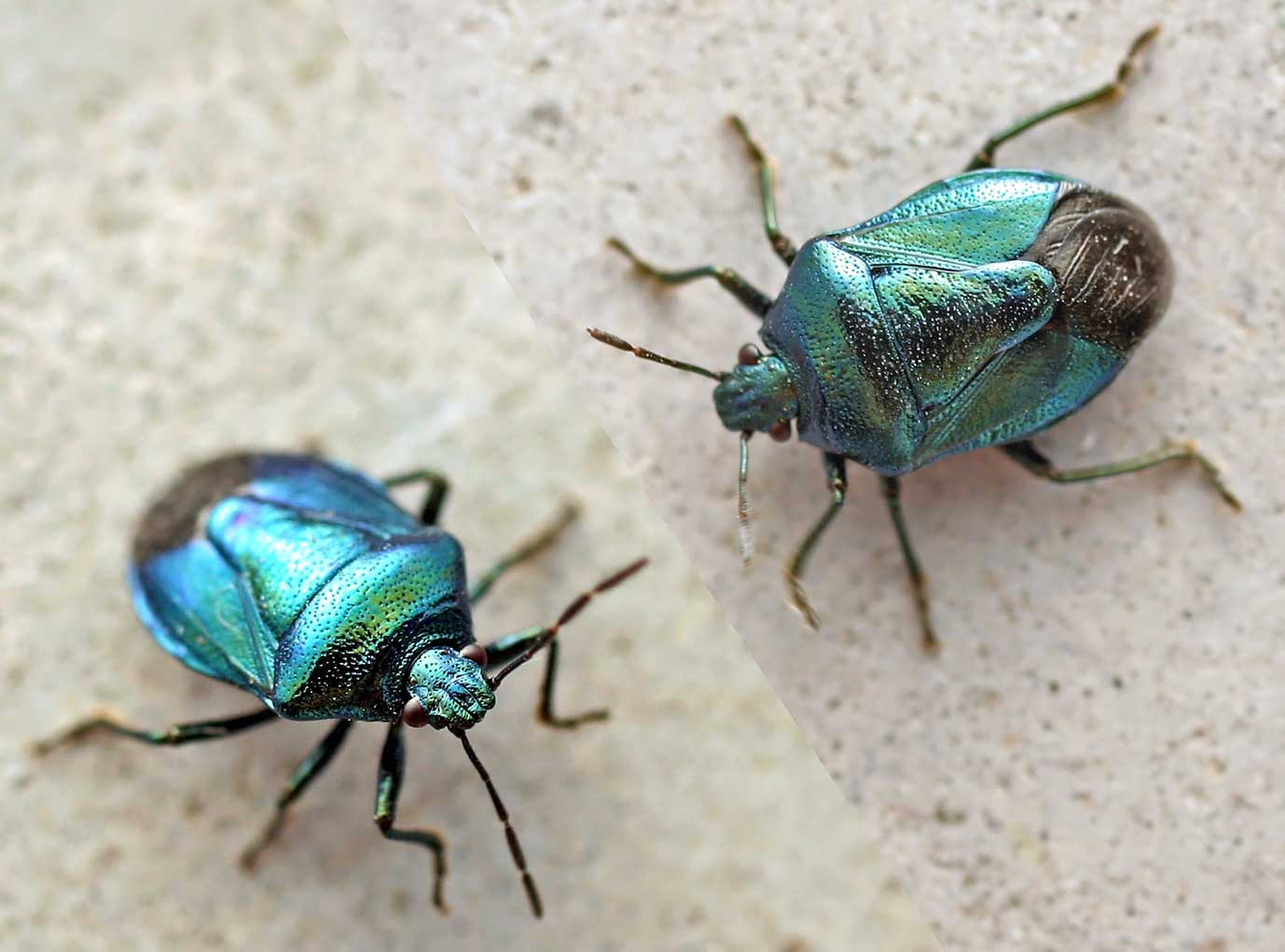
- Adults of Zicrona caerulea
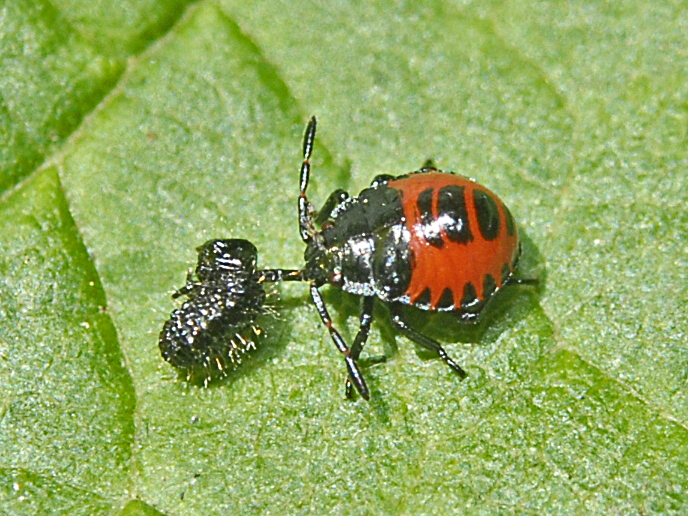
- Nymphs of Zicrona caerulea preying a larva

Scientific classification
- Kingdom: Animalia
- Phylum: Arthropoda
- Class: Insecta
- Order: Hemiptera
- Suborder: Heteroptera
- Family: Pentatomidae
- Genus: Zicrona
- Species: Z. caerulea

Binomial name
- Zicrona caerulea Linnaeus, 1758

Synonyms
- Cimex caeruleus

= Zicrona caerulea =

Species of true bug

Aggregation of nymphs

Zicrona caerulea, the blue shieldbug, is a species of bug of the family Pentatomidae.

== Description ==
Zicrona caerulea can reach an adult size of about 5–8 millimetres (0.20–0.31 in). The body is uniformly metallic blue-green (hence the Latin name caerulea, meaning blue). In the immatures the abdomen is red with black markings.

These bugs are useful predators of leaf beetles in the genus Altica, of larvae of various beetles and caterpillars of moths, but it also feeds on plants. Eggs are laid in the spring. New adults of this univoltine species can be found from July onwards. This bug overwinters as an adult.

== Distribution and habitat ==
This species is present in Eurasia and in North America. Its natural habitat consists of low vegetation in moors, heaths, damp grassland and forest edges.
