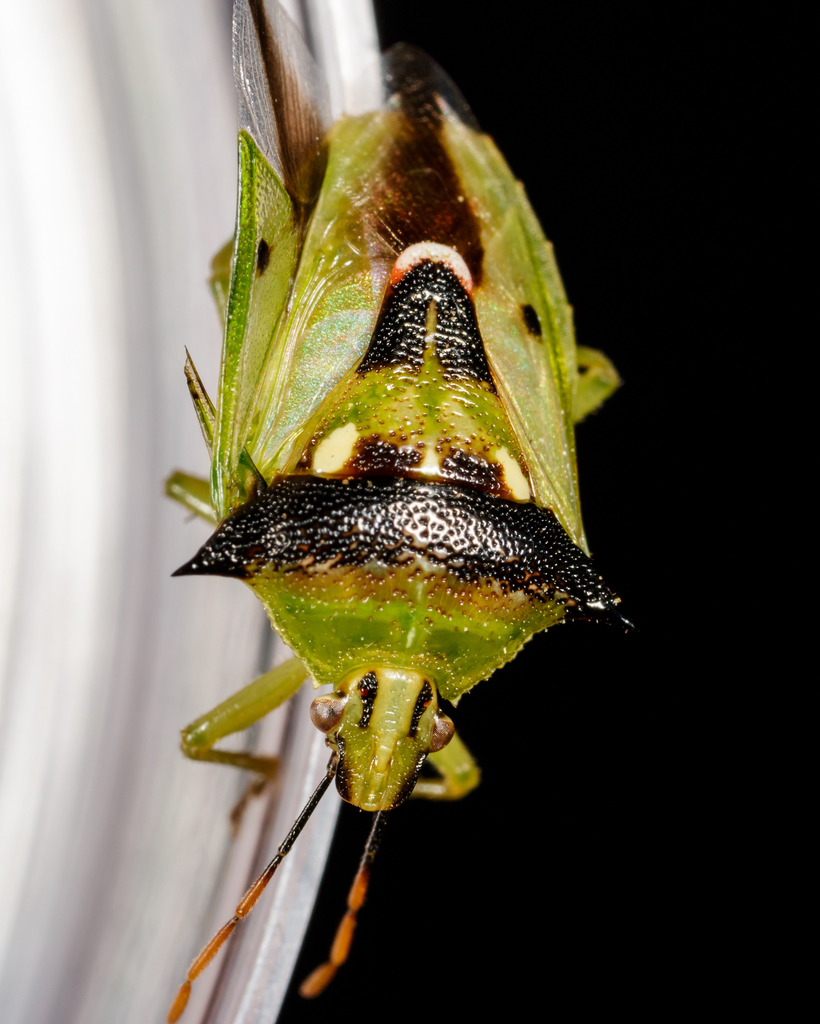

Scientific classification
- Kingdom: Animalia
- Phylum: Arthropoda
- Clade: Pancrustacea
- Class: Insecta
- Order: Hemiptera
- Suborder: Heteroptera
- Family: Pentatomidae
- Genus: Tylospilus
- Species: T. acutissimus

Binomial name
- Tylospilus acutissimus (Stål, 1870)

Synonyms
- Podisus acutissimus Stål, 1870

= Tylospilus acutissimus =

Species of true bug

Tylospilus acutissimus, the Northern sharp stink bug, is a species of stink bug that feeds on both plants and other insects in the United States and Mexico.

== Range ==
Southwestern United States (Southern California to Texas, Missouri, and Nebraska) to Colombia. This range is primarily concentrated from Southern California to Eastern Texas and Mexico, with occasional records from Missouri, Nebraska, and Kansas.

== Ecology ==
Mostly sighted from April to November, with spikes in occurrences in April-May and September-November.

Adult size is 9mm to 10mm (0.35" to 0.39").
