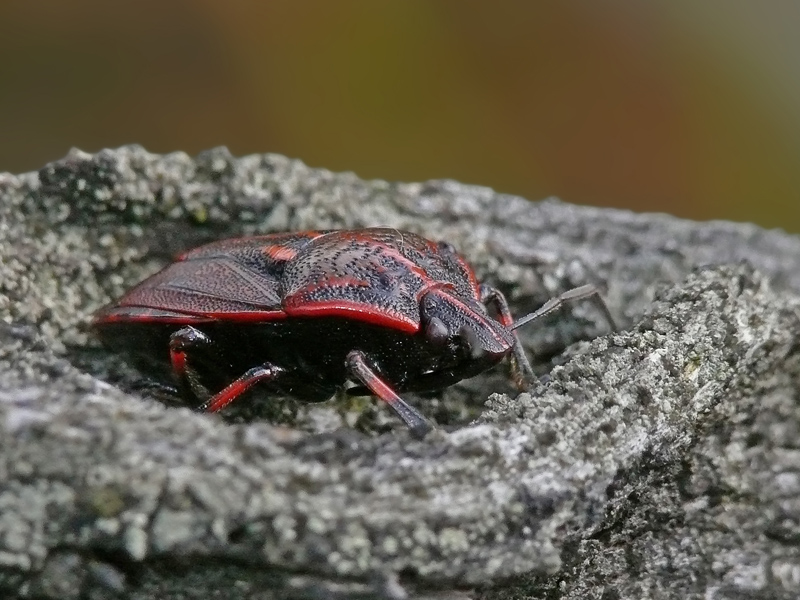
- Jalla dumosa

Scientific classification
- Domain: Eukaryota
- Kingdom: Animalia
- Phylum: Arthropoda
- Class: Insecta
- Order: Hemiptera
- Suborder: Heteroptera
- Family: Pentatomidae
- Subfamily: Asopinae
- Genus: Jalla; Hahn, 1832

= Jalla (bug) =

Genus of true bugs

Jalla is a genus of European shield bugs in the subfamily Asopinae erected by Carl Wilhelm Hahn in 1832. The type species Jalla dumosa is recorded from northern Europe including the British Isles.

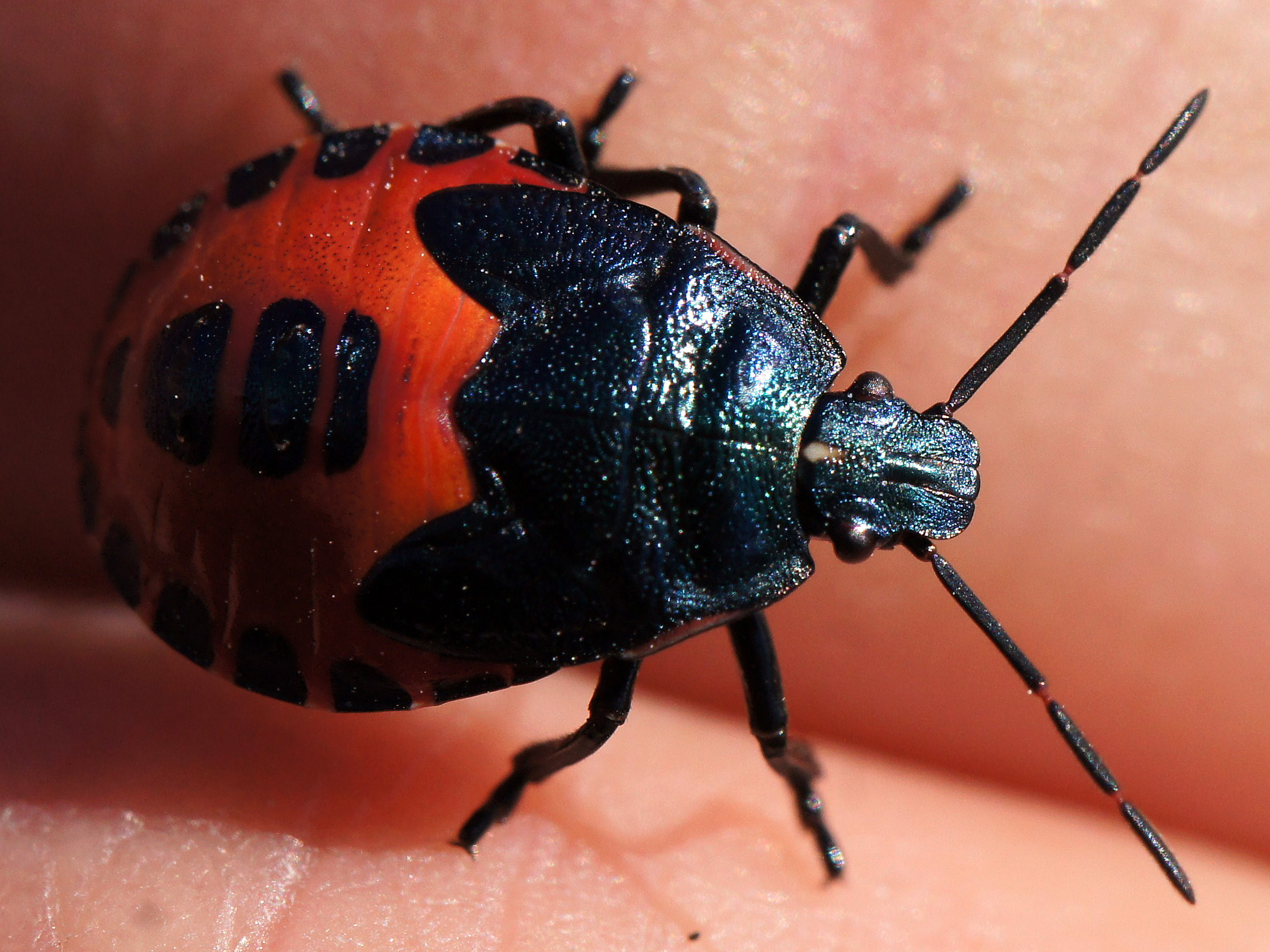
Nymph of Jalla dumosa

== Species ==
According to BioLib the following are included:

1. Jalla anthracina Jakovlev, 1885
2. Jalla dumosa (Linnaeus, 1758)
  - type species (as Cimex dumosus L.)
3. Jalla subcalcarata Jakovlev, 1885
4. Jalla subdilatata Reuter, 1900
