= Microtheca picea =

Scientific classification
- Kingdom: Animalia
- Phylum: Arthropoda
- Clade: Pancrustacea
- Class: Insecta
- Order: Coleoptera
- Suborder: Polyphaga
- Infraorder: Cucujiformia
- Family: Chrysomelidae
- Genus: Microtheca
- Species: M. picea

Binomial name
- Microtheca picea (Guérin-Méneville, 1844)

Species of beetle

Microtheca picea is a species of leaf beetle in the family Chrysomelidae. It is found in North America and South America.
