= Comperocoris =

- Comperocoris roehneri in Southern Chile

Scientific classification
- Kingdom: Animalia
- Phylum: Arthropoda
- Clade: Pancrustacea
- Class: Insecta
- Order: Hemiptera
- Suborder: Heteroptera
- Family: Pentatomidae
- Subfamily: Asopinae
- Genus: Comperocoris; Stål, 1867
- Species: C. roehneri

Binomial name
- Comperocoris roehneri (Philippi, 1862)

Genus of insects

Comperocoris is a genus of stinkbugs in the family Asopinae. It contains one species: Comperocoris roehneri.
