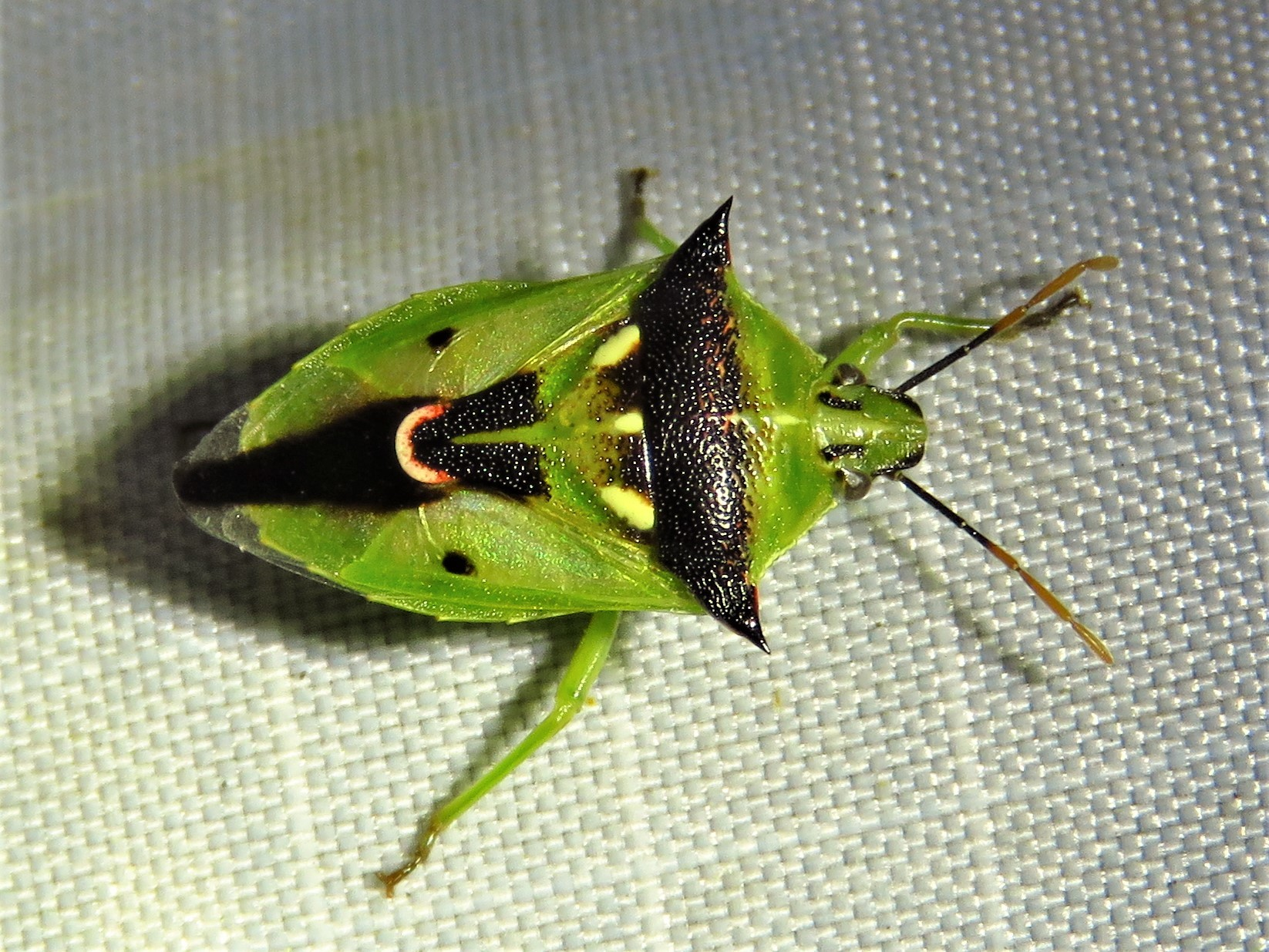
- Tylospilus acutissimus

Scientific classification
- Kingdom: Animalia
- Phylum: Arthropoda
- Class: Insecta
- Order: Hemiptera
- Suborder: Heteroptera
- Family: Pentatomidae
- Subfamily: Asopinae
- Genus: Tylospilus; Stål, 1870

= Tylospilus =

Genus of true bugs

Tylospilus is a genus of predatory stink bugs in the family Pentatomidae. There are about five described species in Tylospilus.

== Species ==
These five species belong to the genus Tylospilus:

- Tylospilus acutissimus (Stål, 1870)
- Tylospilus armatus Thomas, 1992
- Tylospilus chilensis Spinola, 1852
- Tylospilus nigrobinotatus Berg, 1879
- Tylospilus peruvianus Horvath, 1911
