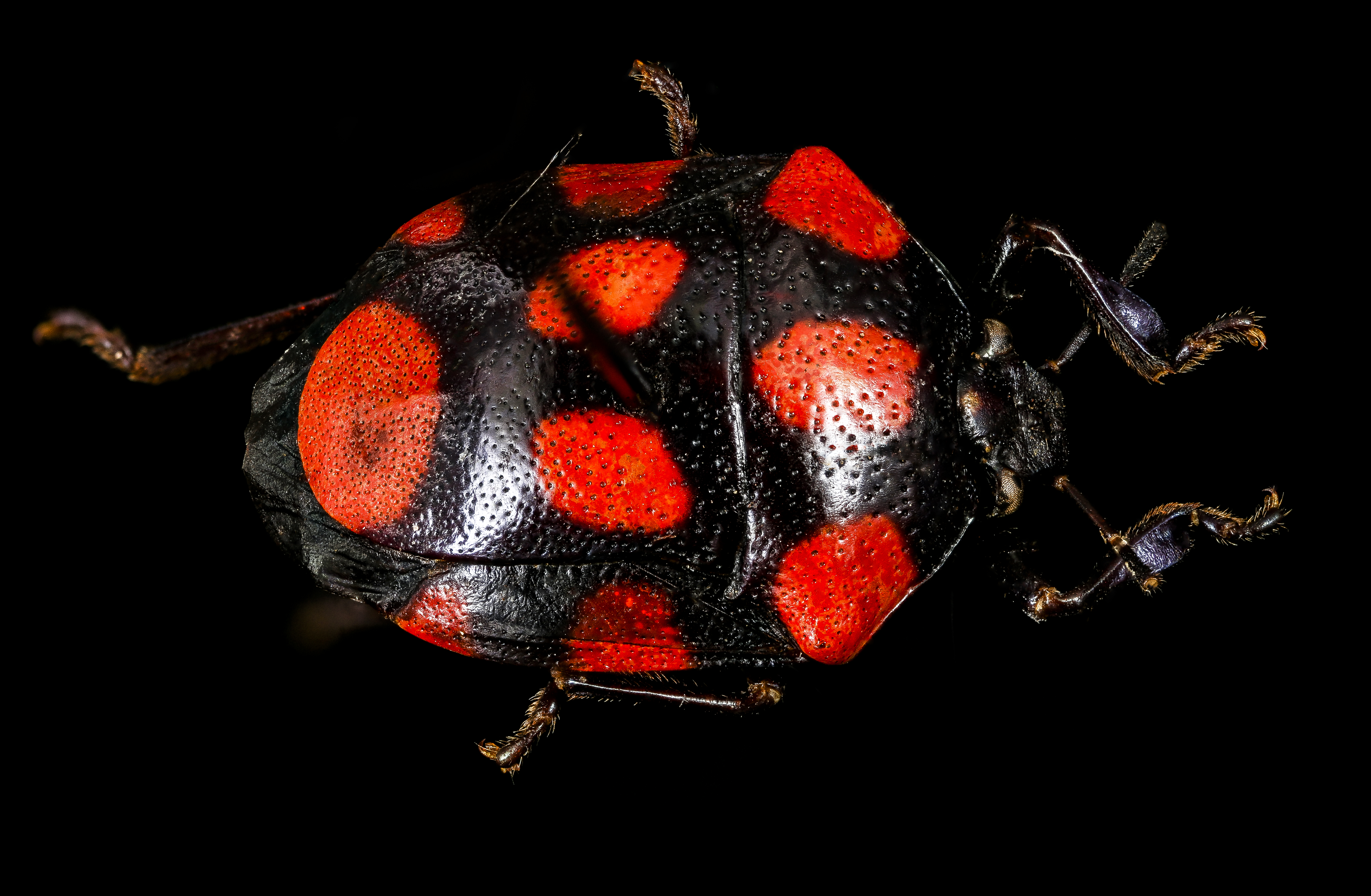

Scientific classification
- Domain: Eukaryota
- Kingdom: Animalia
- Phylum: Arthropoda
- Class: Insecta
- Order: Hemiptera
- Suborder: Heteroptera
- Family: Pentatomidae
- Genus: Stiretrus
- Species: S. decemguttatus

Binomial name
- Stiretrus decemguttatus LePeletier & Serville, 1828

Synonyms
- Scutellera decemguttata (Lepeletier & Serville, 1828), Asopus chalybeus (Herrich-Schäffer, 1836), Asopus chrysoprasinus (Herrich-Schäffer, 1838), Asopus coccineus (Herrich-Schäffer, 1838), Stiretrus decacelis (Berg, 1883), Scutellera eupoda (Perty, 1833), Stiretrus flavatus (Horváth, 1911), Stiretrus flavomaculatus (Stål, 1870), Scutellera latipes (Perty, 1833), Stiretrus lythrodes (Germar, 1839)

= Stiretrus decemguttatus =

Species of insect

Stiretrus decemguttatus is a South American species of true bug found on Ipomoea asarifolia, where it preys upon late instar Botanochara sedecimpustulata and Zatrephina lineata larvae.
