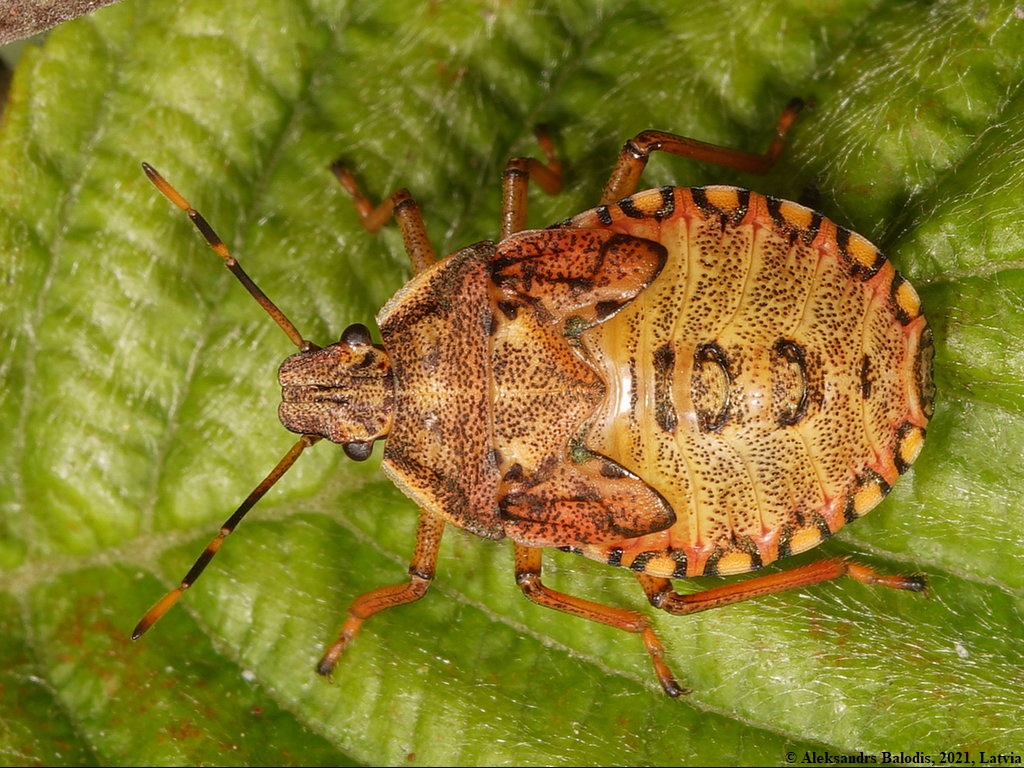

Scientific classification
- Kingdom: Animalia
- Phylum: Arthropoda
- Clade: Pancrustacea
- Class: Insecta
- Order: Hemiptera
- Suborder: Heteroptera
- Family: Pentatomidae
- Subfamily: Asopinae
- Genus: Pinthaeus; Stål, 1867

= Pinthaeus =

Pinthaeuss

Genus of true bugs

Pinthaeus is a genus of stink bugs (family Pentatomidae).

== Species ==
- Pinthaeus sanguinipes (Fabricius, 1781)
