= Apateticus lineolatus =

Scientific classification
- Domain: Eukaryota
- Kingdom: Animalia
- Phylum: Arthropoda
- Class: Insecta
- Order: Hemiptera
- Suborder: Heteroptera
- Family: Pentatomidae
- Genus: Apateticus
- Species: A. lineolatus

Binomial name
- Apateticus lineolatus (Herrich-Schaeffer, 1840)

Synonyms
- Halys lineolatus Herrich-Schaeffer, 1840

Species of true bug

Apateticus lineolatus is a species of predatory stink bug in the family Pentatomidae. It is found in Central America, North America, and South America.
