= Apateticus =

Scientific classification
- Domain: Eukaryota
- Kingdom: Animalia
- Phylum: Arthropoda
- Class: Insecta
- Order: Hemiptera
- Suborder: Heteroptera
- Family: Pentatomidae
- Subfamily: Asopinae
- Genus: Apateticus; Dallas, 1851

Subgenera
- Apateticus (Apateticus) Dallas, 1851; Apateticus (Apoecilus) Stål, 1870

Genus of true bugs

Apateticus is a genus of predatory stink bugs in the family Pentatomidae. There are about seven described species in Apateticus.

== Species ==
These seven species belong to the genus Apateticus:

- Apateticus anatarius Van Duzee, 1935
- Apateticus bracteatus (Fitch, 1856)
- Apateticus crocatus (Uhler, 1897)
- Apateticus cynicus (Say, 1832)
- Apateticus lineolatus (Herrich-Schaeffer, 1840)
- Apateticus ludovicianus Stoner
- Apateticus marginiventris (Stål, 1870)
