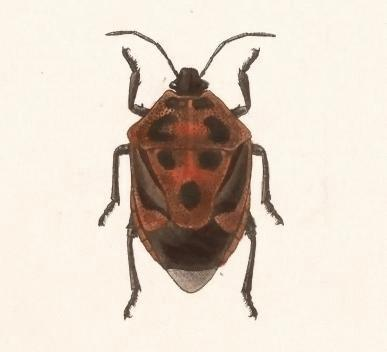
- Oplomus dichrous

Scientific classification
- Domain: Eukaryota
- Kingdom: Animalia
- Phylum: Arthropoda
- Class: Insecta
- Order: Hemiptera
- Suborder: Heteroptera
- Family: Pentatomidae
- Subfamily: Asopinae
- Genus: Oplomus; Spinola, 1840

Subgenera
- Oplomus (Oplomus) Spinola, 1840; Oplomus (Polypoecilus) Stål, 1870

= Oplomus =

Genus of true bugs

Oplomus is a genus of predatory stink bugs in the family Pentatomidae. There are about nine described species in Oplomus.

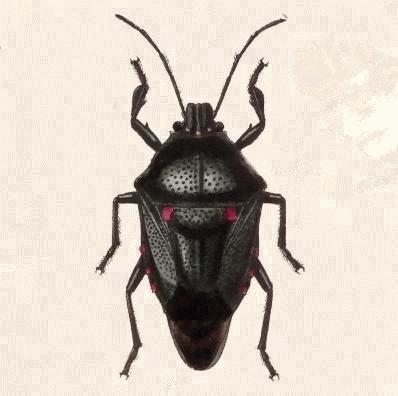
Oplomus mundus

== Species ==
These nine species belong to the genus Oplomus:

- Oplomus annotatus Uhler
- Oplomus catena Drury, 1782
- Oplomus cruentus (Burmeister, 1835)
- Oplomus dichrous (Herrich-Schaeffer, 1838)
- Oplomus festivus Dallas, 1851
- Oplomus marginalis Westwood, 1837
- Oplomus mundus Stål, 1862
- Oplomus pulchriventris Horvath, 1911
- Oplomus salamandra (Burmeister, 1835)
