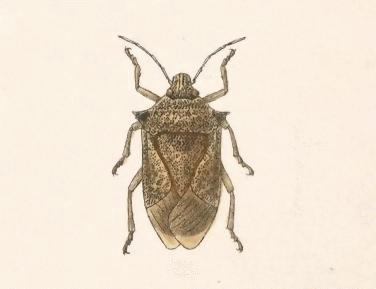

Scientific classification
- Domain: Eukaryota
- Kingdom: Animalia
- Phylum: Arthropoda
- Class: Insecta
- Order: Hemiptera
- Suborder: Heteroptera
- Family: Pentatomidae
- Genus: Podisus
- Species: P. sagitta

Binomial name
- Podisus sagitta (Fabricius, 1794)

= Podisus sagitta =

Species of true bug

Podisus sagitta is a species of predatory stink bug in the family Pentatomidae. It is found in the Caribbean Sea, Central America, North America, and South America.
