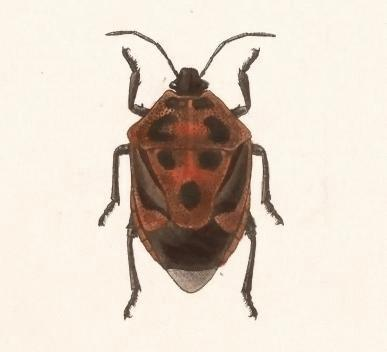

Scientific classification
- Domain: Eukaryota
- Kingdom: Animalia
- Phylum: Arthropoda
- Class: Insecta
- Order: Hemiptera
- Suborder: Heteroptera
- Family: Pentatomidae
- Genus: Oplomus
- Species: O. dichrous

Binomial name
- Oplomus dichrous (Herrich-Schaeffer, 1838)

= Oplomus dichrous =

Species of true bug

Oplomus dichrous is a species of predatory stink bug in the family Pentatomidae. It is found in Central America and North America.
