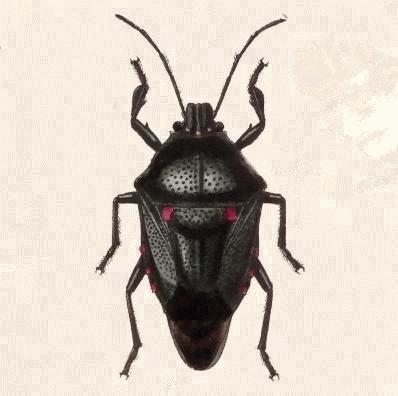

Scientific classification
- Domain: Eukaryota
- Kingdom: Animalia
- Phylum: Arthropoda
- Class: Insecta
- Order: Hemiptera
- Suborder: Heteroptera
- Family: Pentatomidae
- Genus: Oplomus
- Species: O. mundus

Binomial name
- Oplomus mundus Stål, 1862

= Oplomus mundus =

Species of true bug

Oplomus mundus is a species of predatory stink bug in the family Pentatomidae. It is found in Central America and North America.
