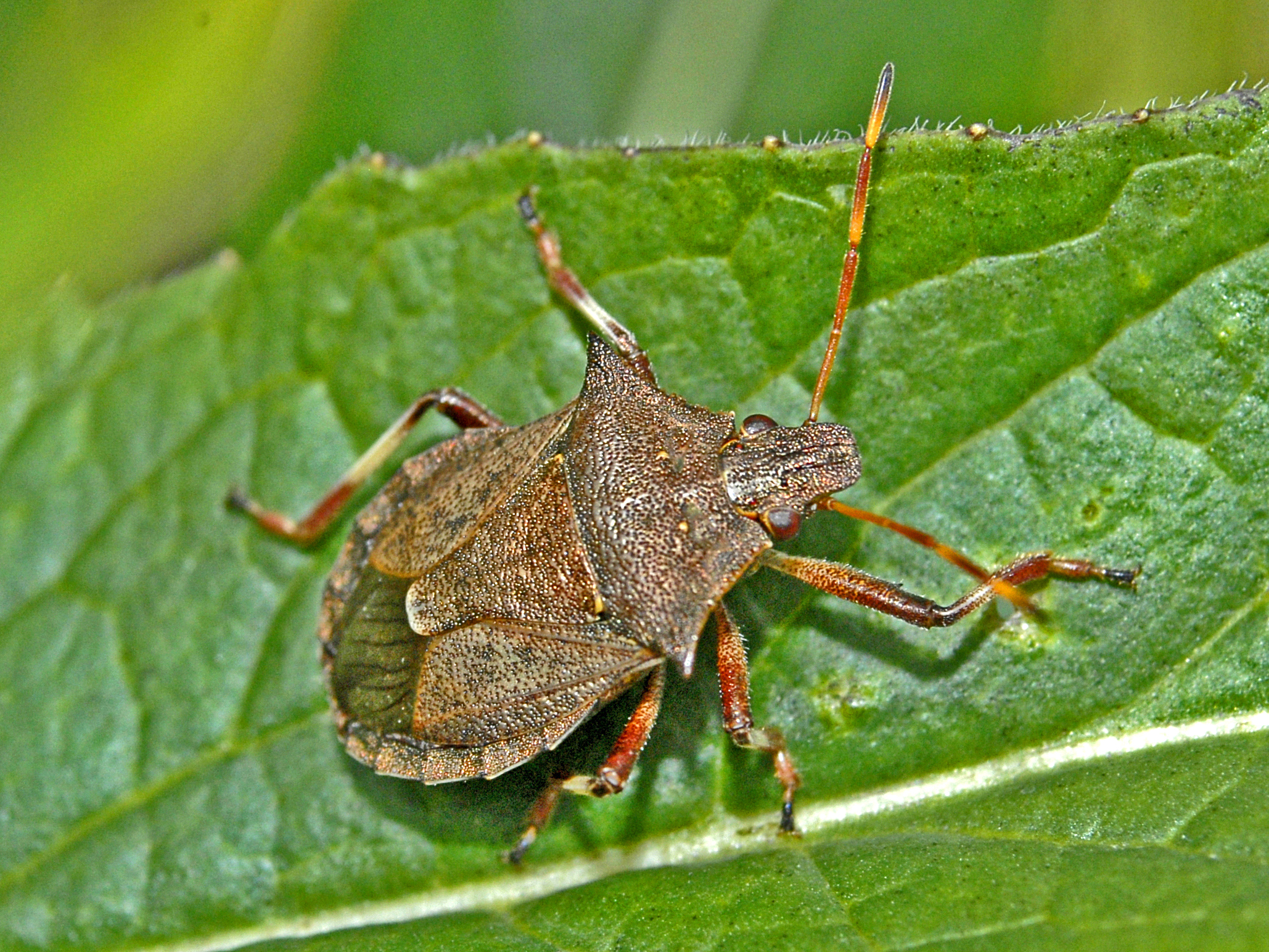

Scientific classification
- Kingdom: Animalia
- Phylum: Arthropoda
- Clade: Pancrustacea
- Class: Insecta
- Order: Hemiptera
- Suborder: Heteroptera
- Family: Pentatomidae
- Subfamily: Asopinae
- Genus: Picromerus; Amyot & Serville, 1843

= Picromerus =

Genus of insects

Picromerus is a genus of shield bugs in the family Pentatomidae.

== Species ==
- Picromerus bidens (Linnaeus, 1758)
- Picromerus brachypterus Ahmad & Önder, 1990
- Picromerus conformis (Herrich-Schäffer, 1841)
- Picromerus elevatus Zhao, Liu & Bu, 2013
- Picromerus fasciaticeps Zheng & Liu, 1987
- Picromerus griseus (Dallas, 1851)
- Picromerus lewisi Scott, 1874
- Picromerus nigridens (Fabricius, 1803)
- Picromerus orientalis Rishi & Abbasi, 1973
- Picromerus pseudobidens Ahmad & Önder, 1990
- Picromerus viridipunctatus Yang, 1935
