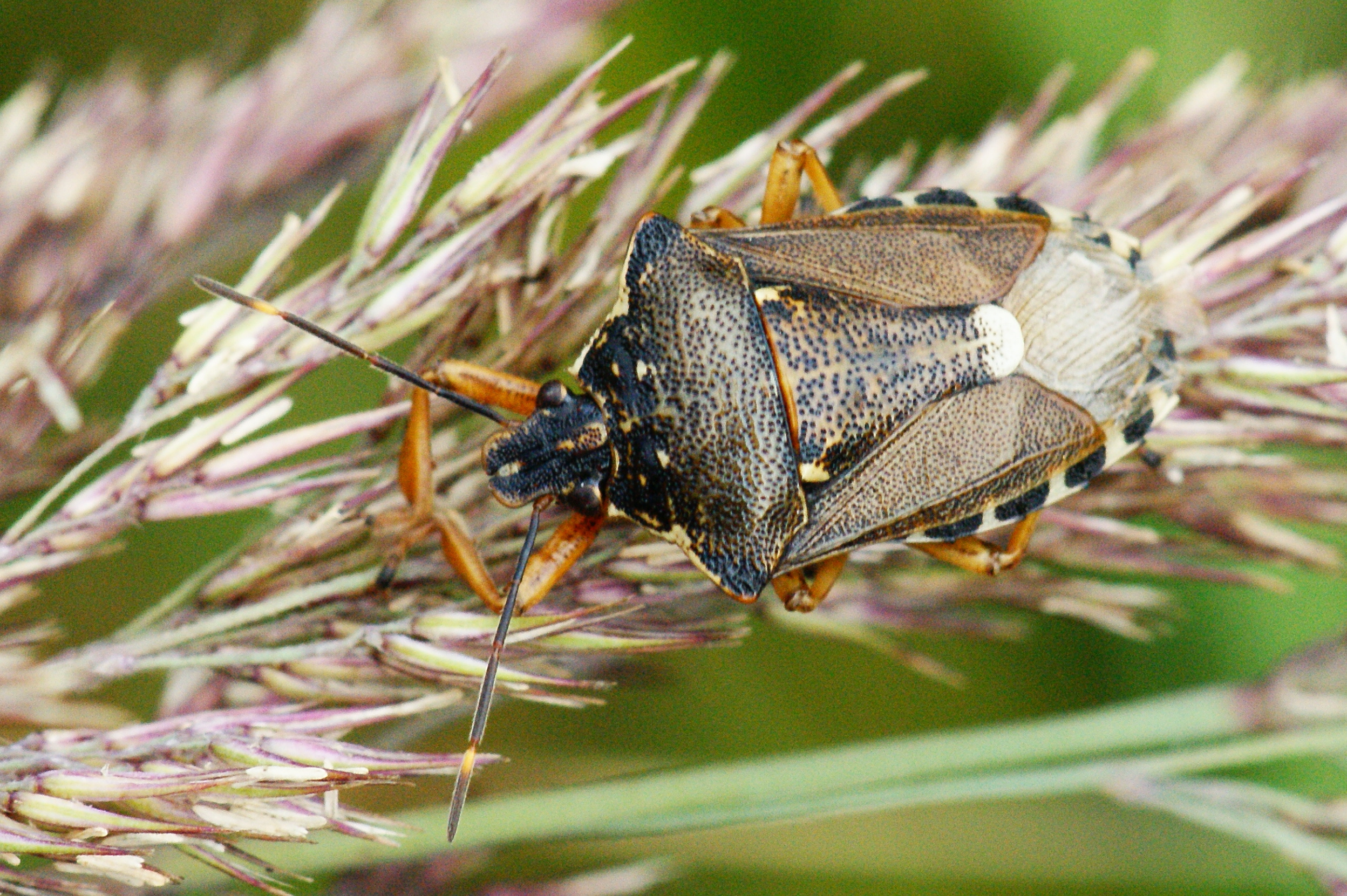

Scientific classification
- Kingdom: Animalia
- Phylum: Arthropoda
- Clade: Pancrustacea
- Class: Insecta
- Order: Hemiptera
- Suborder: Heteroptera
- Family: Pentatomidae
- Genus: Pinthaeus
- Species: P. sanguinipes

Binomial name
- Pinthaeus sanguinipes (Fabricius, 1781)

= Pinthaeus sanguinipes =

Species of true bug

Pinthaeus sanguinipes is a species of stink bug (family Pentatomidae).

== Description ==
Pinthaeus sanguinipes can reach a length of 13–17 millimetres (0.51–0.67 in). These stink bugs overwinter as adults, females lay their eggs in May and the adults are present from August. Adults of these red-legged bugs prey on other insect and they mainly feed on the larvae of beetles, sawflies and butterflies, especially on the larvae of the lymantriid Dasychira pudibunda.

== Distribution ==
This species is present in most of Europe.

== Habitat ==
This quite rare stink bug prefers the edges of the forest of deciduous trees and can be usually be found on the foliage of trees and shrubs.
