= Apateticus marginiventris =

Scientific classification
- Kingdom: Animalia
- Phylum: Arthropoda
- Clade: Pancrustacea
- Class: Insecta
- Order: Hemiptera
- Suborder: Heteroptera
- Family: Pentatomidae
- Genus: Apateticus
- Species: A. marginiventris

Binomial name
- Apateticus marginiventris (Stål, 1870)

Species of true bug

Apateticus marginiventris is a species of predatory stink bug in the family Pentatomidae. It is found in Central America and North America.
