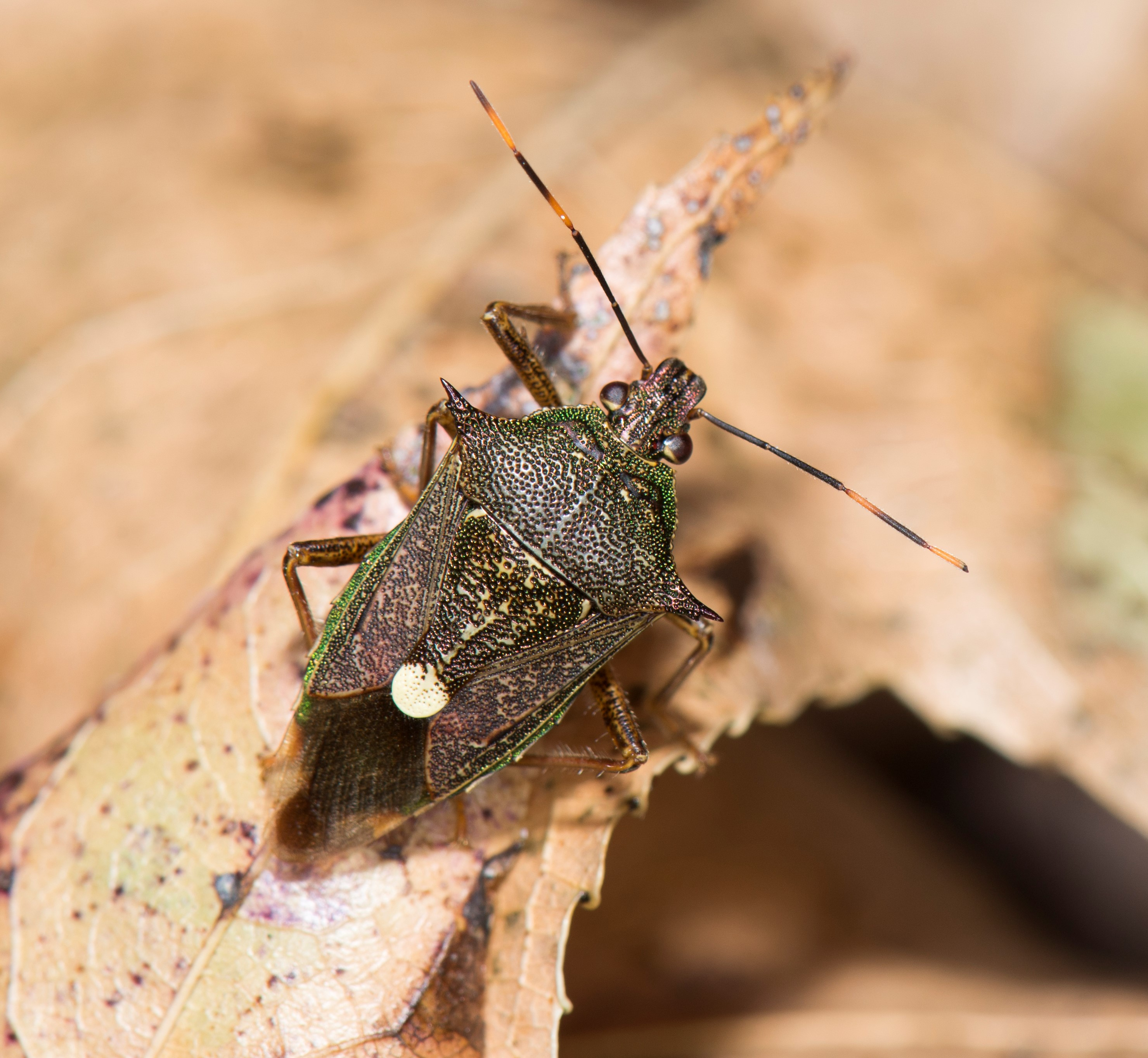
- Eocanthecona formosa

Scientific classification
- Missing taxonomy template (fix): Eocanthecona

= Eocanthecona =

Genus of true bugs

Eocanthecona is a genus of Asian and Australian shield bugs in the subfamily Asopinae, erected by Ernst Evald Bergroth in 1915.

== Species ==
BioLib includes:

1. Eocanthecona acuta (Vollenhoven, 1868)
2. Eocanthecona binotata (Distant, 1879)
3. Eocanthecona concinna (Walker, 1867)
4. Eocanthecona eburnea Bergroth, 1915
5. Eocanthecona formosa (Horváth, 1911)
6. Eocanthecona furcellata (Wolff, 1811) – type species (as Cimex furcellatus Wolff)
7. Eocanthecona gaugleri (Schneider, 1940)
8. Eocanthecona insularis (Kirby, 1891)
9. Eocanthecona japonicola (Esaki & Ishihara, 1950)
10. Eocanthecona kyushuensis (Esaki & Ishihara, 1950)
11. Eocanthecona latipes (Stål, 1871)
12. Eocanthecona neotibialis (Ahmad & Rana, 1988)
13. Eocanthecona ornatula (Distant, 1908)
14. Eocanthecona parva (Distant, 1902)
15. Eocanthecona plebeja (Vollenhoven, 1868)
16. Eocanthecona populusi (Ahmad & Rana, 1988)
17. Eocanthecona robusta (Distant, 1879)
18. Eocanthecona rufescens (Vollenhoven, 1868)
19. Eocanthecona shikokuensis (Esaki & Ishihara, 1950)
20. Eocanthecona thomsoni (Distant, 1911)
21. Eocanthecona tibialis (Distant, 1879)
22. Eocanthecona variabilis (Vollenhoven, 1868)
23. Eocanthecona vollenhoveni (Breddin, 1902)
