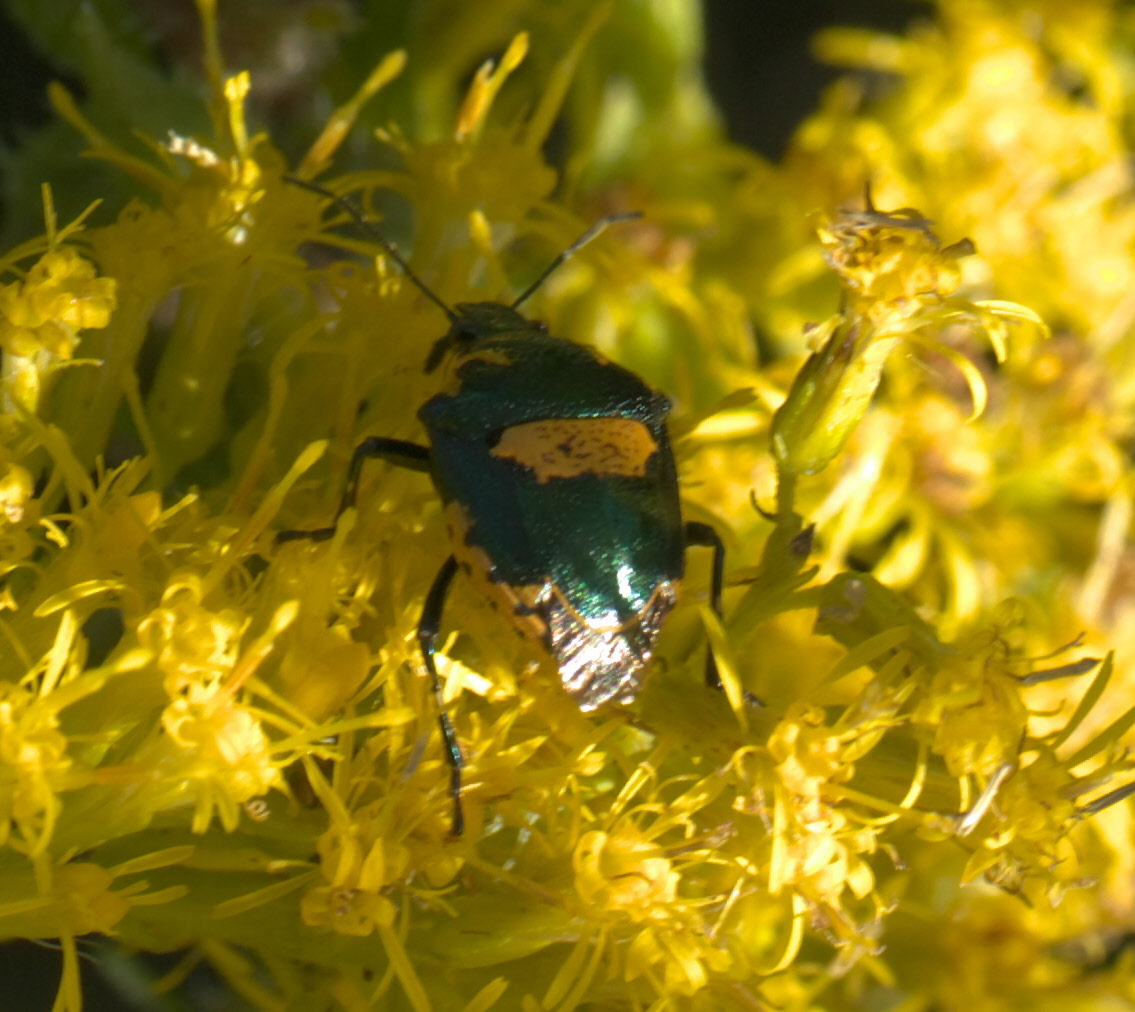
- Stiretrus anchorago

Scientific classification
- Kingdom: Animalia
- Phylum: Arthropoda
- Class: Insecta
- Order: Hemiptera
- Suborder: Heteroptera
- Family: Pentatomidae
- Subfamily: Asopinae
- Genus: Stiretrus; Laporte, 1833

= Stiretrus =

Genus of true bugs

Stiretrus is a genus of predatory stink bugs in the family Pentatomidae. Described species of Stiretrus have been recorded from the Americas.

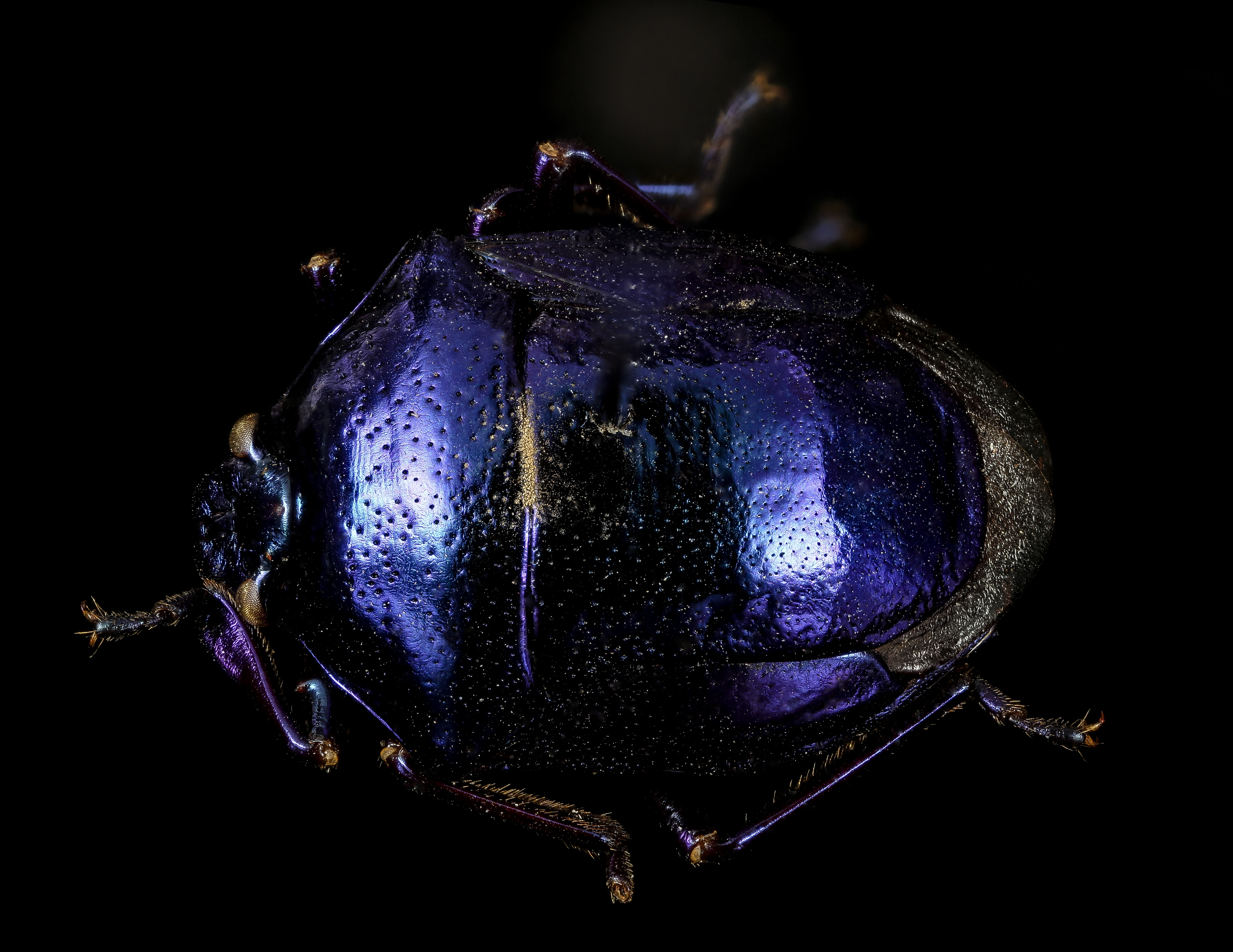
Stiretrus decemguttatus

== Species ==
These eight species belong to the genus Stiretrus:

- Stiretrus anchorago (Fabricius, 1775) (anchor stink bug)
- Stiretrus bifrenatus Breddin, 1906
- Stiretrus cinctellus Germar, 1839
- Stiretrus decastigmus Herrich-Schäffer, 1838
- Stiretrus decemguttatus (Lepeletier & Serville, 1828)
- Stiretrus erythrocephalus (Lepeletier & Serville, 1828)
- Stiretrus loratus Germar, 1839
- Stiretrus quinquepunctatus Germar, 1839
