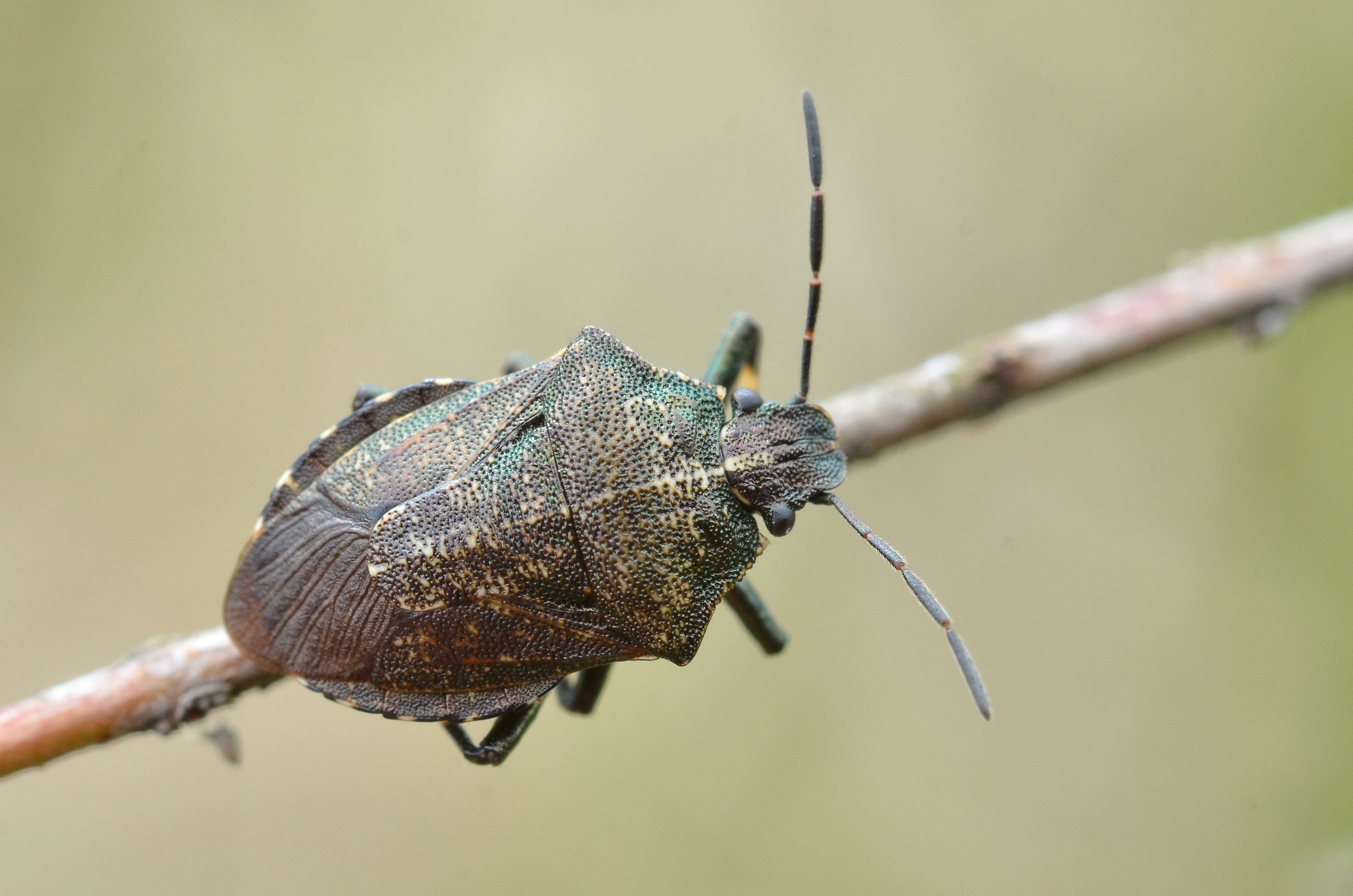
- Rhacognathus punctatus, imago

Scientific classification
- Kingdom: Animalia
- Phylum: Arthropoda
- Clade: Pancrustacea
- Class: Insecta
- Order: Hemiptera
- Suborder: Heteroptera
- Family: Pentatomidae
- Subfamily: Asopinae
- Genus: Rhacognathus; Fieber, 1860

= Rhacognathus =

Genus of true bugs

Rhacognathus is a genus of stink bugs (family Pentatomidae).

== Species ==
- Rhacognathus americanus Stål, 1870
- Rhacognathus callosus Horváth, 1903
- Rhacognathus corniger Hsiao & Cheng, 1977
- Rhacognathus punctatus (Linnaeus, 1758) - heather bug
