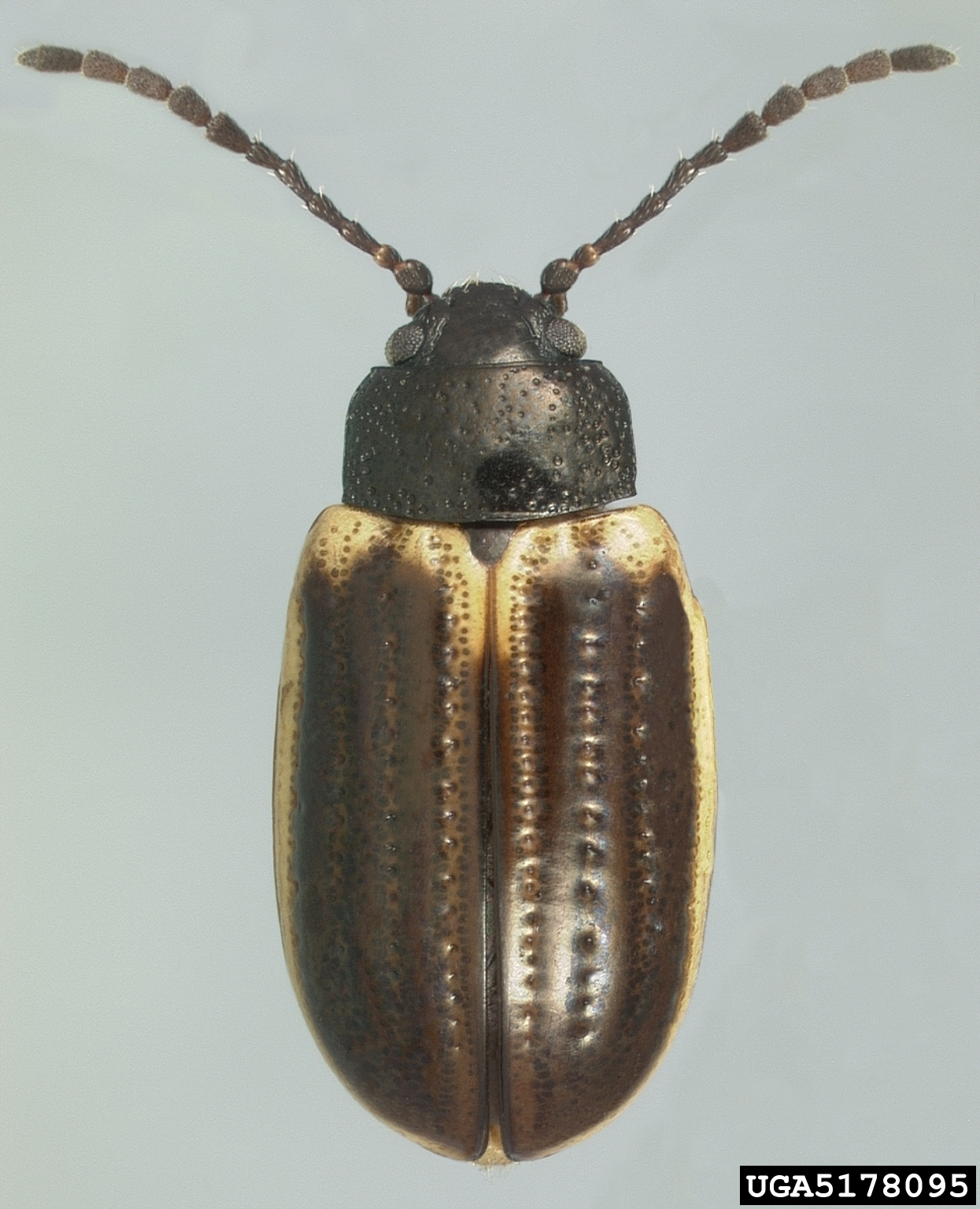

Scientific classification
- Domain: Eukaryota
- Kingdom: Animalia
- Phylum: Arthropoda
- Class: Insecta
- Order: Coleoptera
- Suborder: Polyphaga
- Infraorder: Cucujiformia
- Family: Chrysomelidae
- Genus: Microtheca
- Species: M. ochroloma

Binomial name
- Microtheca ochroloma Stål, 1860

= Microtheca ochroloma =

Species of beetle

Microtheca ochroloma, the yellow-margined leaf beetle, is a species of leaf beetle in the family Chrysomelidae. It is found in North America and South America.
