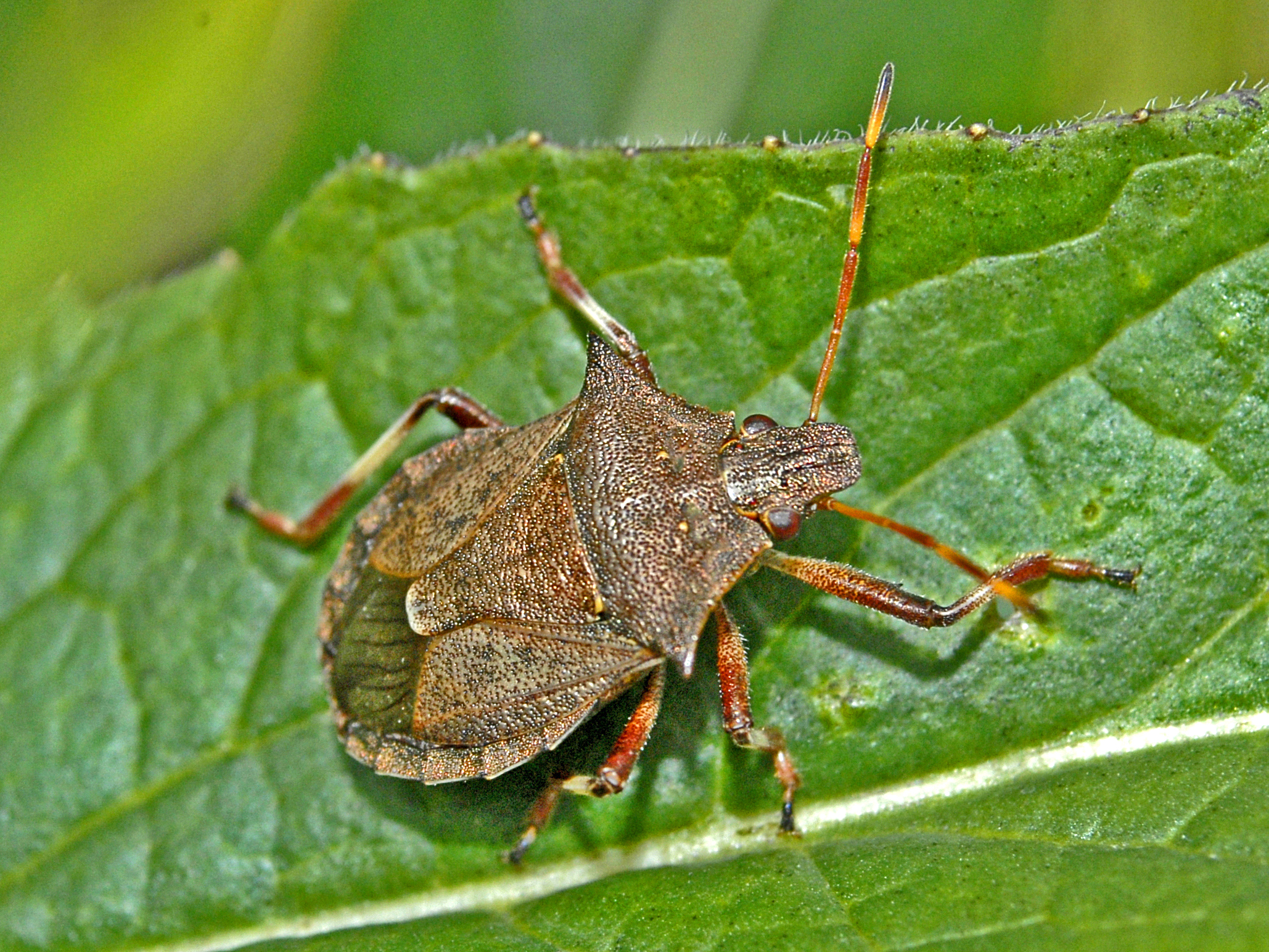
- Adult

Scientific classification
- Kingdom: Animalia
- Phylum: Arthropoda
- Class: Insecta
- Order: Hemiptera
- Suborder: Heteroptera
- Family: Pentatomidae
- Genus: Picromerus
- Species: P. bidens

Binomial name
- Picromerus bidens (Linnaeus, 1758)

Synonyms
- Cimex bidens Linnaeus, 1758; Cimex bilobus Schrank, 1781; Picromerus fuscoannulatus Stål, 1858; Picromerus longicollis Jakovlev, 1902

= Picromerus bidens =

Species of insect

Picromerus bidens, the spiny shieldbug or spiked shieldbug, is a carnivorous species of shield bug in the family Pentatomidae.

== Distribution and habitat ==
This species has a wide distribution in the Palaearctic, from 64°N to North Africa and from the British Isles to China. It has also been introduced, probably more than once, to North America, where it has been recorded from more than 180 sites.

== Habitat ==
These bugs prefer deciduous and mixed forests, heathland, gardens, chalk downland and damp flower-rich meadows.

== Description ==
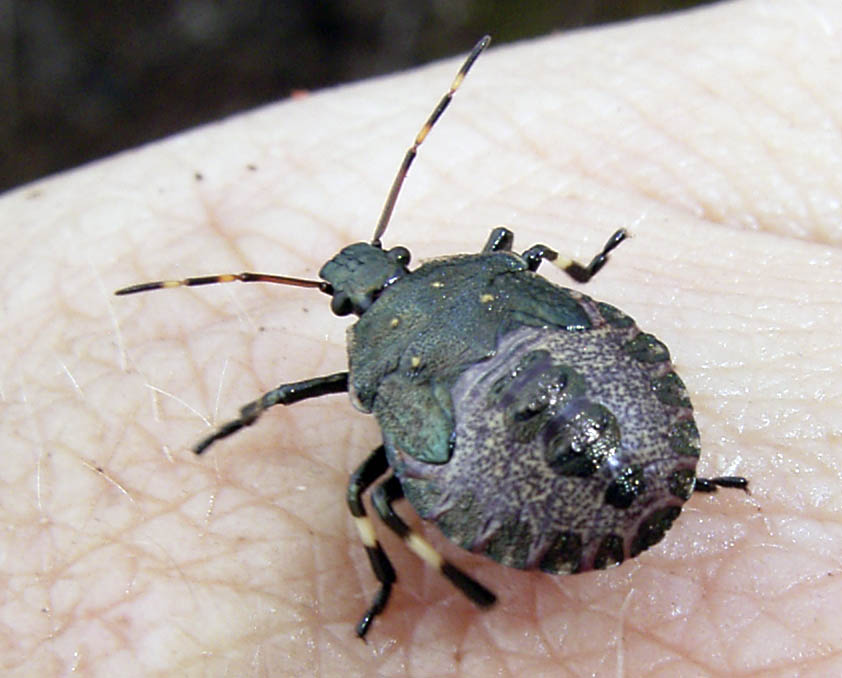
Final instar nymph

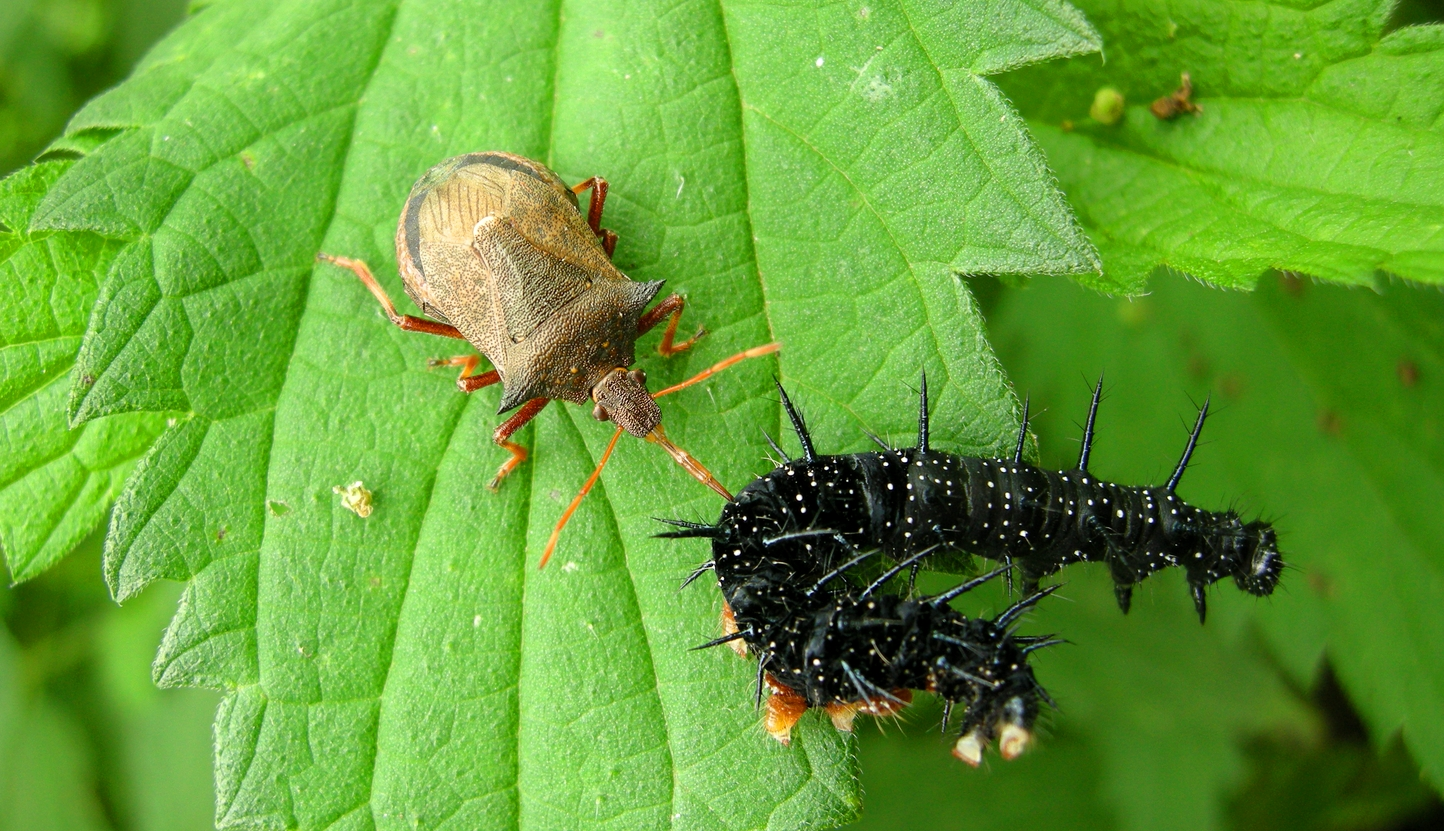
Picromerus bidens feeding on a European peacock caterpillar

Picromerus bidens is a large (12 to 13.5 mm long) and distinctive predatory shieldbug. It shows a thick rostrum directed away from head. Body colour is quite variable, generally light to dark brown or bluish, with red-brown antennae and legs and two unmistakable thornlike brown projections on the sides of the pronotum (hence the species name bidens, meaning "with two teeth"). Front femurs are armed with a ventral spine distally. The early instar nymphs are commonly reddish, while the final instar nymphs are greyish black, with banded antennae and legs.

== Biology ==
Both adults and nymphs of the spiny shieldbugs are predatory, feeding on the larvae of other insects, especially on leaf bugs, beetles, aphids and caterpillars. The choice of the prey depend on the season and availability of food. However both adults and nymphs also suck sap from plants. The female lays eggs on tree trunks and leaves. In the spring the larvae hatch, growing to the adult bugs after five moultings. Nymphs become adults by July or August and adults can be found until November. This species usually overwinters as eggs and less frequently as nymphs.

== Bibliography ==
- Dmitry L. Musolin, Aida H. Saulich: Summer dormancy ensures univoltinism in the predatory bug Picromerus bidens. Entomologia Experimentalis et Applicata, 95, 3, S. 259–267, 2000 doi:10.1046/j.1570-7458.2000.00665.x
- Kamran Mahdian, Luc Tirry & Patrick De Clercq: Development of the predatory pentatomid Picromerus bidens (L.) at various constant temperatures. Belg. J. Zool., 138, 2, S. 135–139, 2008
- Kamran Mahdian, Luc Tirry & Patrick De Clercq: Functional response of Picromerus bidens: effects of host plant. Journal of Applied Entomology, 131, 3, S. 160–164, 2007 doi:10.1111/j.1439-0418.2006.01124.x
- Kamran Mahdian, Thomas Van Leeuwen, Luc Tirry and Patrick De Clercq: Susceptibility of the predatory stinkbug Picromerus bidens to selected insecticides. BioControl, 52, 6, S. 765–774, 2007 doi:10.1007/s10526-007-9075-3
- Martin Konvicka, Vladimir Hula und Zdenek Fric: Picromerus bidens (Heteroptera: Pentatomidae) as predator of the Checkerspot Euphydryas aurinia (Lepidoptera: Nymphalidae). Entomologica Fennica, 16, S. 233–236, 2005 PDF
- T. R. E. Southwood und D. Leston: Land and Water Bugs of the British Isles. Frederick Warne & Co. Ltd., 1959
