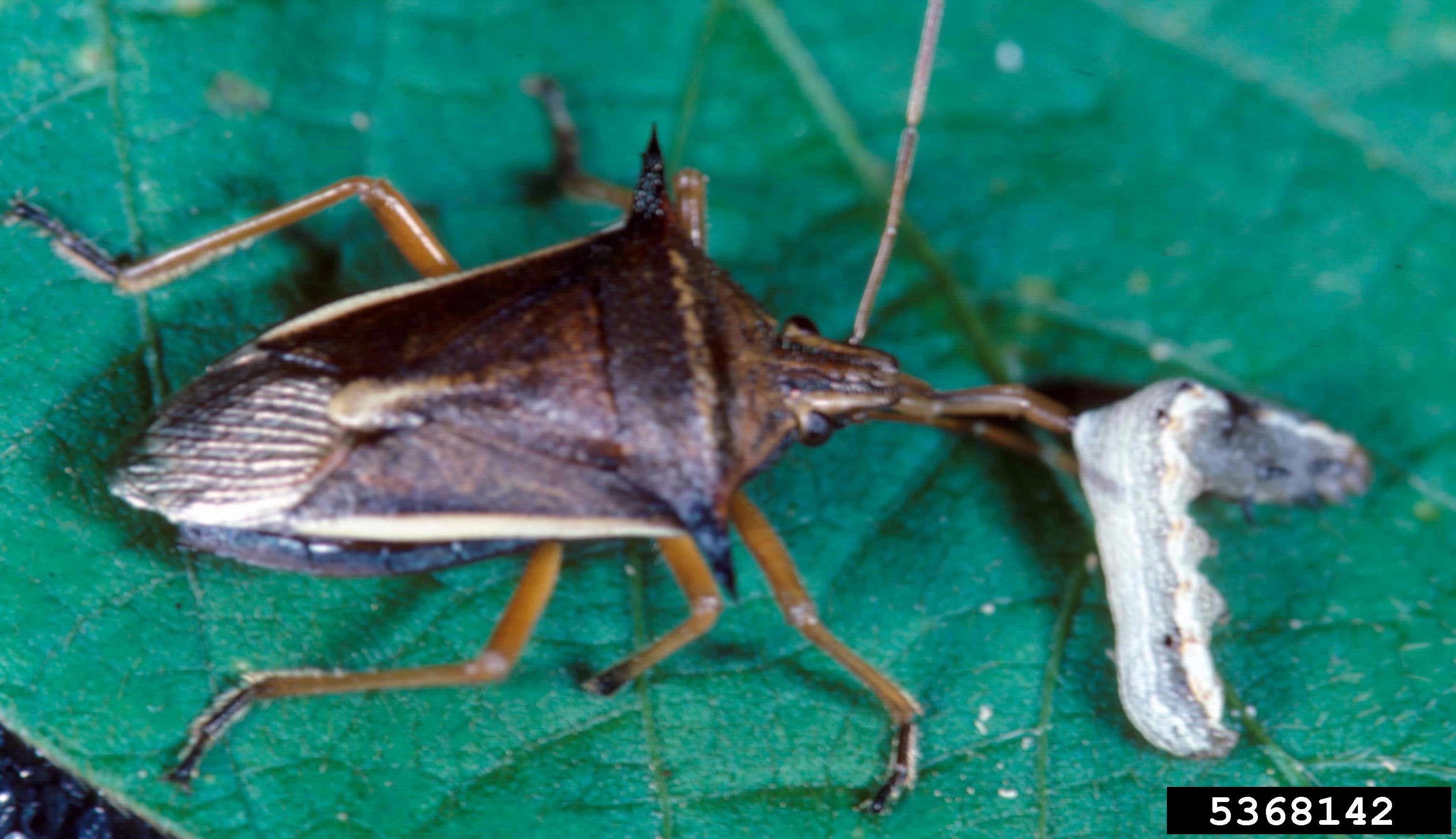

Scientific classification
- Domain: Eukaryota
- Kingdom: Animalia
- Phylum: Arthropoda
- Class: Insecta
- Order: Hemiptera
- Suborder: Heteroptera
- Family: Pentatomidae
- Genus: Andrallus; Bergroth, 1905
- Species: A. spinidens

Binomial name
- Andrallus spinidens (Fabricius, 1787)

= Andrallus =

Genus of true bugs

Andrallus is a genus of predatory stink bugs in the family Pentatomidae. There is at least one described species in Andrallus, A. spinidens.
