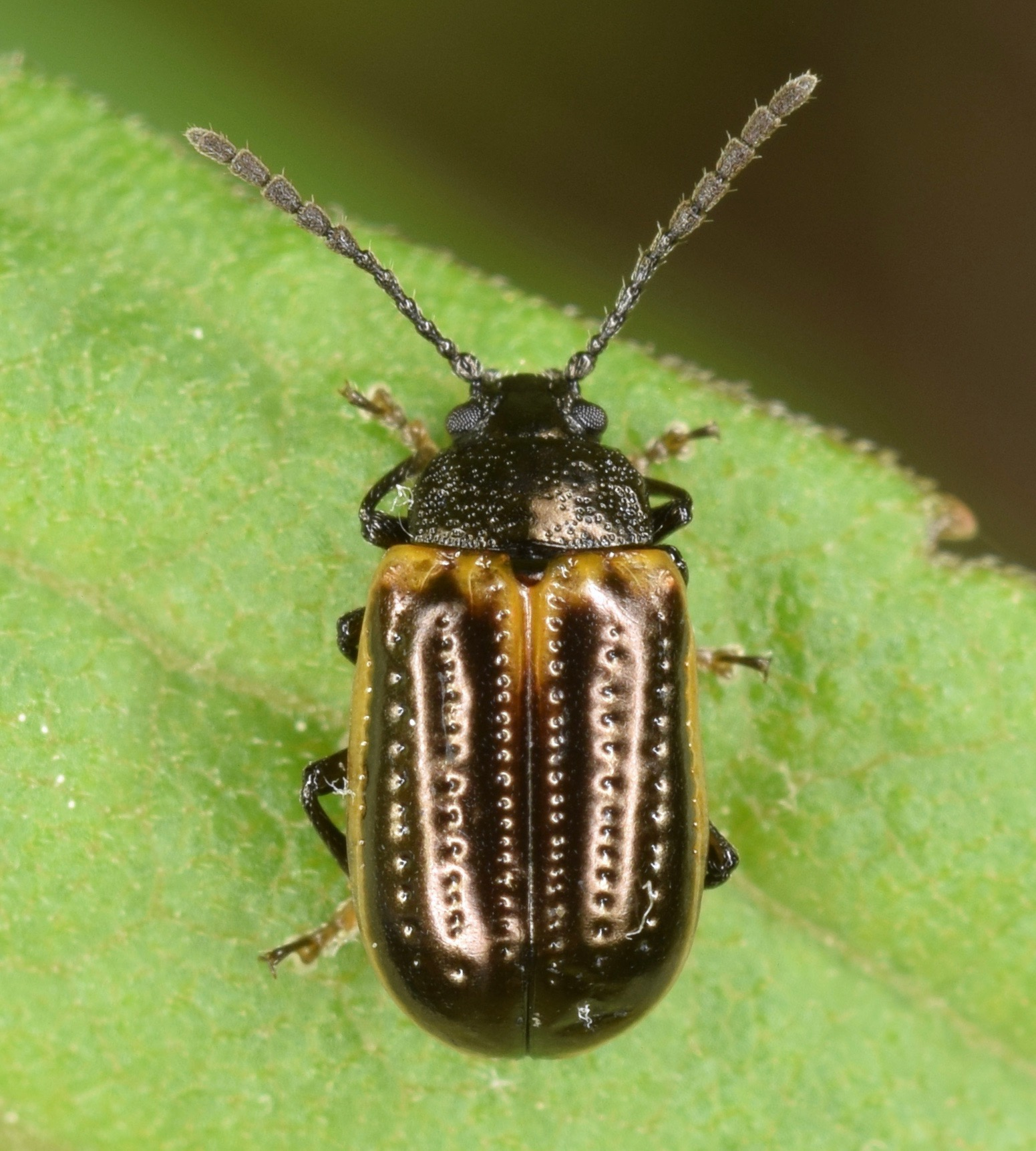
- Microtheca ochroloma

Scientific classification
- Kingdom: Animalia
- Phylum: Arthropoda
- Class: Insecta
- Order: Coleoptera
- Suborder: Polyphaga
- Infraorder: Cucujiformia
- Family: Chrysomelidae
- Tribe: Chrysomelini
- Genus: Microtheca; Stål, 1860

= Microtheca (beetle) =

Genus of beetles

Microtheca is a genus of Chrysomelinae (a subfamily of leaf beetles). It is native to South America, with two species also occurring in the southeastern United States as introduced species.

== Species ==
The genus includes the following 15 species:

- Microtheca bechynei Jolivet, 1950 – Peru
- Microtheca boliviana Achard, 1917 – Bolivia
- Microtheca columbiana Steinheil, 1877 – Colombia
- Microtheca freyi Jolivet, 1950 – Peru
- Microtheca lacustris Bechyné, 1958 – Peru
- Microtheca nitens Bechyné, 1946 – Bolivia
- Microtheca ochroloma Stål, 1860 (yellow-margined leaf beetle) – Brazil, Argentina, Chile, North America (introduced)
- Microtheca orophila Jolivet, 1950 – Bolivia
- Microtheca parvula Bechyné, 1948 – Argentina
- Microtheca picea (Guérin-Méneville, 1844) – Uruguay, North America (introduced)
- Microtheca piceitarsis Stål, 1860 – Brazil
- Microtheca planicollis Bechyné, 1946 – Argentina, Brazil
- Microtheca punctigera Achard, 1917 – Argentina, Chile, Brazil
- Microtheca rubricollis (Philippi & Philippi, 1864) – Chile
- Microtheca semilaevis Stål, 1860 – Brazil, Uruguay, Argentina, Peru
- Microtheca weyrauchi Bechyné, 1958 – Peru
