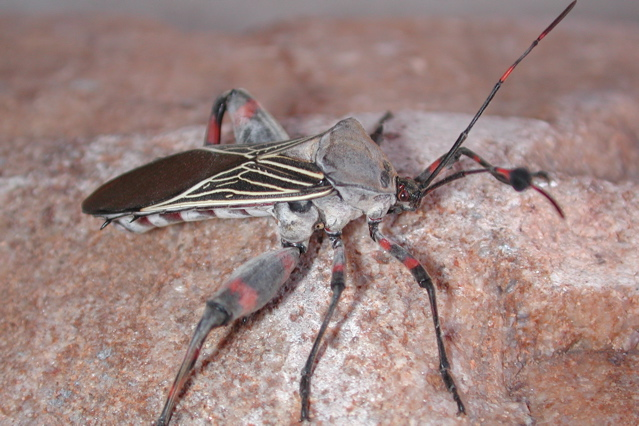

Scientific classification
- Kingdom: Animalia
- Phylum: Arthropoda
- Clade: Pancrustacea
- Class: Insecta
- Order: Hemiptera
- Suborder: Heteroptera
- Family: Coreidae
- Tribe: Nematopodini
- Genus: Thasus; Stål, 1865

= Thasus (bug) =

Genus of true bugs

Thasus is an insect genus of the Coreidae, or leaf-footed bugs. It is a genus in the New World Nematopodini tribe that feeds on plants. It is chiefly found in Central America, but species also occur in South America, and as far north as the American Southwest.

== History ==
In 1862, Carl Stål distinguished two types in the then existing genus Pachylis, those where the muscle widening (dilation) of the hind-leg tibia occurs only ventrally (downward), and those where it occurs on both sides (ventrally and dorsally). In 1865, he separated these into two genera, leaving the ventral only type in Pachylis, and moving the three species with the muscle widening on both sides into the newly established genus Thasus. Those three species then became Thasus acutangulus, Thasus gigas and Thasus heteropus. In 1867 he published a key to the two genera. Van Duzee later picked Thasus gigas as the type species (logotype) for the genus, as he felt that it best represented the characteristics of the genus.

== Species ==
- Thasus acutangulus (Stål, 1859)
- Thasus carchinus Brailovsky & Barrera in Brailovsky et al., 1995
- Thasus gigas (Klug, 1835)
- Thasus heteropus (Latreille, 1811)
- Thasus luteolus Brailovsky & Barrera in Brailovsky et al., 1995
- Thasus neocalifornicus Brailovsky & Barrera in Brailovsky et al., 1995
- Thasus odonnellae Schaefer & Packauskas in Brailovsky et al., 1995
- Thasus rutilus Brailovsky & Barrera in Brailovsky et al., 1995
