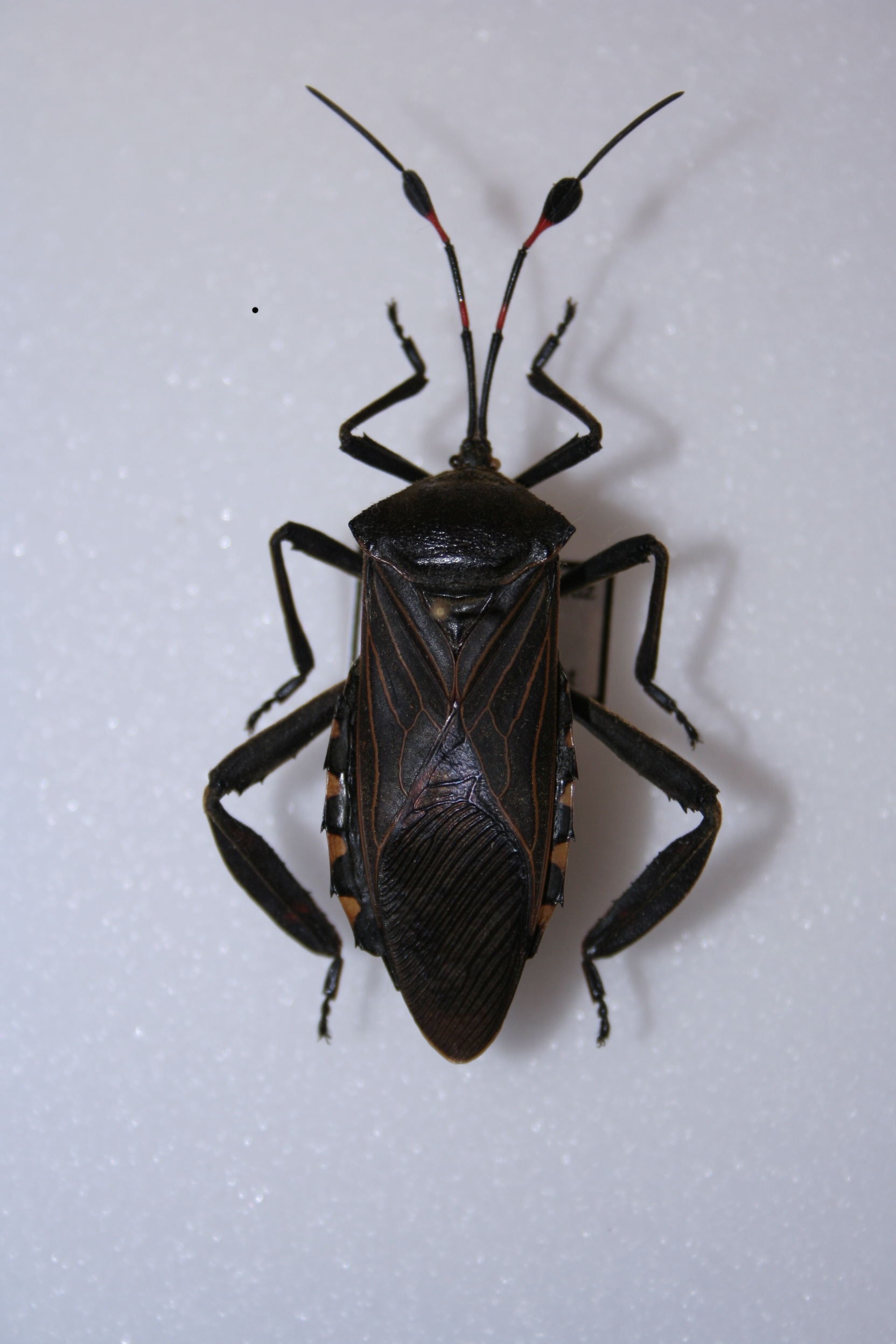

Scientific classification
- Kingdom: Animalia
- Phylum: Arthropoda
- Clade: Pancrustacea
- Class: Insecta
- Order: Hemiptera
- Suborder: Heteroptera
- Family: Coreidae
- Genus: Thasus
- Species: T. acutangulus

Binomial name
- Thasus acutangulus (Stål, 1859)

Synonyms
- Pachylis acutangula (Stål, 1859)

= Thasus acutangulus =

Species of leaf-footed bug

Thasus acutangulus, the mesquite bug, also referred to as Pachylis acutangula, is a leaf-footed bug. Swedish entomologist Carl Stål described it in 1859.

== Description ==
=== Female ===
The head is black laterally with a reddish-brown disk, while the ocelli are ringed with black and feature a lateral yellow semicircle. The first antennal segment is deep reddish-brown with black coloration at the base and apex. The second and third antennal segments have a basal half that is orange and an apical half that is black, while the fourth segment is missing in the holotype but appears brown-black in other specimens. The pronotum is reddish-brown, with a paler callar region, a black collar, and a thin lateral black line that transitions to yellow posteriorly. The posterior edge is yellow. The scutellum is reddish-brown, with yellow lateral edges and an apex. The corium is dark brown with yellow veins, and the membrane is black. Connexival segments 3–7 exhibit a dark reddish-brown color posteriorly and an orange hue anteriorly. The abdominal dorsum is black. The thoracic pleura are broadly reddish-brown, progressively darkening to black near the coxa and posterior edge.

Anterior lobe of metathoracic scent gland opening black, bordered by yellow. Legs reddish-brown, apices and bases of segments black; tarsi black. Abdominal sterna reddish-brown, apicolateral borders of each black. Spiracle ringed with black. Structure: Apical 2/3 of antennal 3 expanded, slightly asymmetrically. Pronotal rise about 60°; lateral edge crenulate; humeral angles acute. Connexivum exposed lateral to wings; connexival segments 3–7 with apicolateral spines, that on 3 very small; that on 7 smaller than that on 6. Note: all other female specimens of T. acutangulus examined, lack a seventh-connexival spine. Hind tibial expansion without large tooth, anterior margin smooth, posterior margin with small teeth; hind coxae with small protuberance; hind trochanter with small spine.

Recognized by its large size, humeral angles exposed, third antennal segment broad, obovate, and foliate, second antennal bicolored, fourth antennal brown to black, and larger (usually above 7.30 mm), and femora and tibiae entirely black or bright orange with anterior and posterior third black and in each case without orange rings. Features which distinguish T. acutangulus from the related T. gigas and T. neocalifornicus, are discussed under these species.

== Range ==
Most commonly recorded in Mexico and Guatemala.

The species has been recorded in Mexico, specifically in Veracruz (Orizaba and Misantla), as well as in Guatemala (Senahu and Cerro Zunil). In British Honduras (now Belize), it has been documented along the River Sarstoon. A record from Costa Rica (Guanacaste) is likely a misidentification, as noted by Distant (1881–1892), Aldrich and Blum (1978), and Walker (1871). Additionally, reports of this species in the United States are considered misidentifications of Thasus neocalifornicus.

== Habitat ==
The foliage of native trees.

Mostly seen occurring from March to August, with a large spike during the months of April and May specifically.

== Ecology ==
Schaefer and Mitchell (1983) noted that the food plant record previously attributed to this species by Aldrich and Blum (1978) is likely misidentified and should instead correspond to Pachylis laticornis.

== Taxonomy ==
The reason Thasus acutangulus is also referred to as Pachylis acutangula stems from the historical difficulty in distinguishing these two genera. Both Pachylis and Thasus share nearly identical diagnostic characteristics, including robust black bodies, expanded antennomeres, and metatibiae (tibiae of the hind legs). The primary distinction—whether the metatibiae expand ventrally (Pachylis) or on both sides (Thasus)—was once used to separate them taxonomically. However, recent phylogenetic studies have found this trait to be homoplasic, meaning it evolved independently and does not reliably differentiate the two genera. As a result, the traditional classification has been re-evaluated, leading to taxonomic uncertainty and the use of both names for the same species in different contexts.
