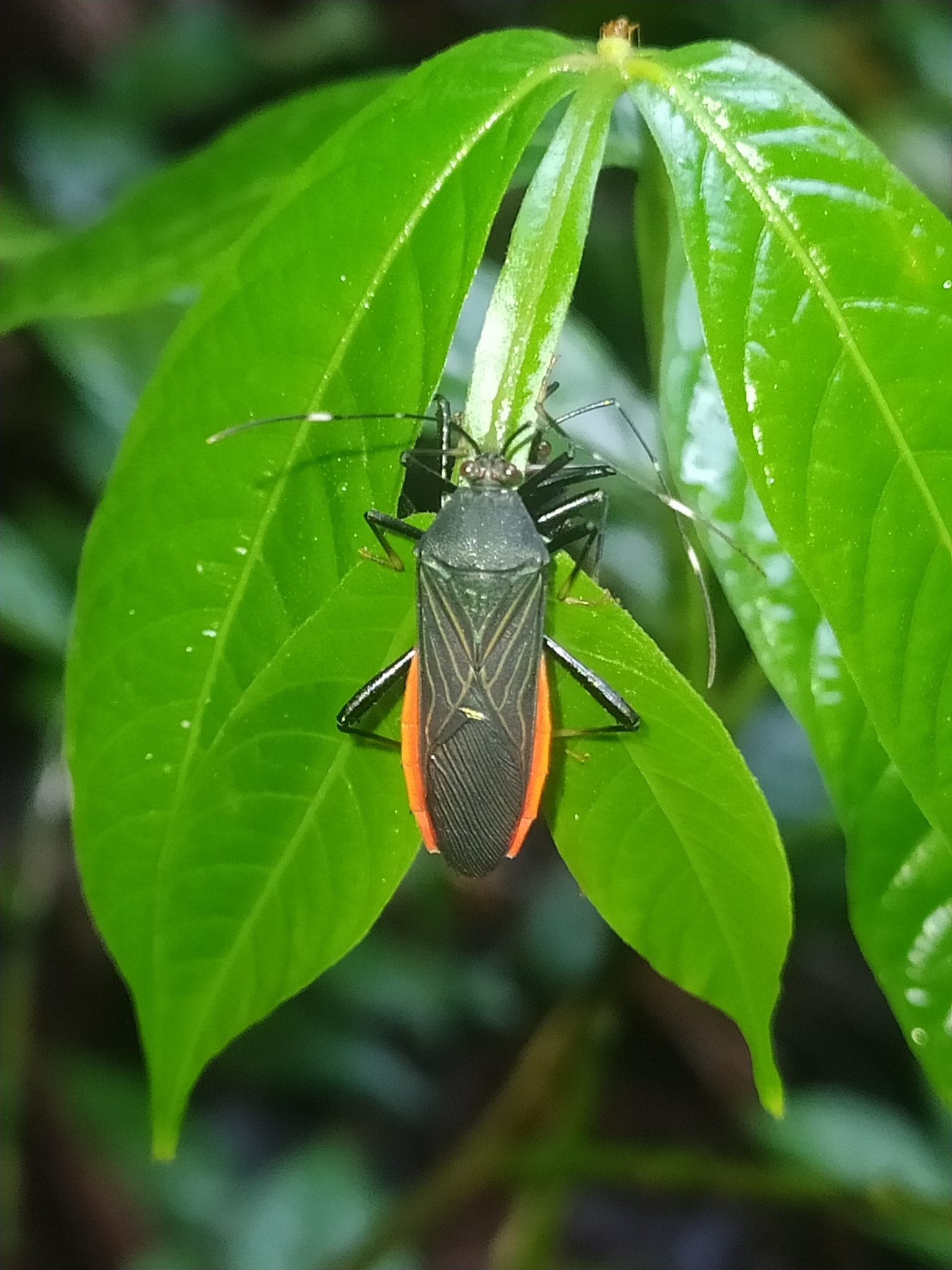

Scientific classification
- Kingdom: Animalia
- Phylum: Arthropoda
- Class: Insecta
- Order: Hemiptera
- Suborder: Heteroptera
- Family: Coreidae
- Genus: Nematopus
- Species: N. indus

Binomial name
- Nematopus indus (Linnaeus, 1758)

= Nematopus indus =

Species of insect

Nematopus indus is a species of insect from the genus Nematopus.

== Range ==
Nematopus indus has been observed and documented in Argentina, Bolivia, Brazil, Chile, French Guiana, Guyana, Suriname, Venezuela

== Taxonomy ==
Nematopus indus is part of the genus Nematopus, which consists of 30 species. This genus is one of the most diverse genera of Nematopodini in the Western Hemisphere and is found primarily in the tropical and subtropical regions.
