= Mozena arizonensis =

Scientific classification
- Domain: Eukaryota
- Kingdom: Animalia
- Phylum: Arthropoda
- Class: Insecta
- Order: Hemiptera
- Suborder: Heteroptera
- Family: Coreidae
- Genus: Mozena
- Species: M. arizonensis

Binomial name
- Mozena arizonensis Ruckes, 1955

Species of true bug

Mozena arizonensis is a species of leaf-footed bug in the family Coreidae. It is found in Central America and North America.
