= Lineostethus =

Scientific classification
- Kingdom: Animalia
- Phylum: Arthropoda
- Clade: Pancrustacea
- Class: Insecta
- Order: Hemiptera
- Suborder: Heteroptera
- Family: Pentatomidae
- Tribe: Discocephalini
- Genus: Lineostethus; Ruckes, 1966

Genus of true bugs

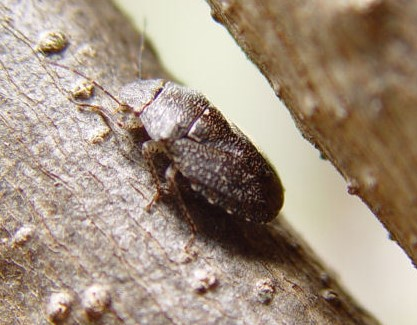
Lineostethus tenebricornis

Lineostethus is a genus of stink bugs in the family Pentatomidae and tribe Discocephalini; species are recorded from the Americas.

== Species ==
The following are included in BioLib.cz:

1. Lineostethus acuminatus Kochenborger & Garbelotto, 2018
2. Lineostethus auritus Garbelotto & Kochenborger, 2018
3. Lineostethus clypeatus (Stål, 1862)
4. Lineostethus graziae Hildebrand & Becker, 1982
5. Lineostethus marginellus (Stål, 1872)
6. Lineostethus otarus Garbelotto & Kochenborger, 2018
7. Lineostethus sinuosus Kochenborger & Garbelotto, 2018
8. Lineostethus tenebricornis (Ruckes, 1957)
