= Cora Linn Daniels =

American novelist and bibliophile (1852–1934

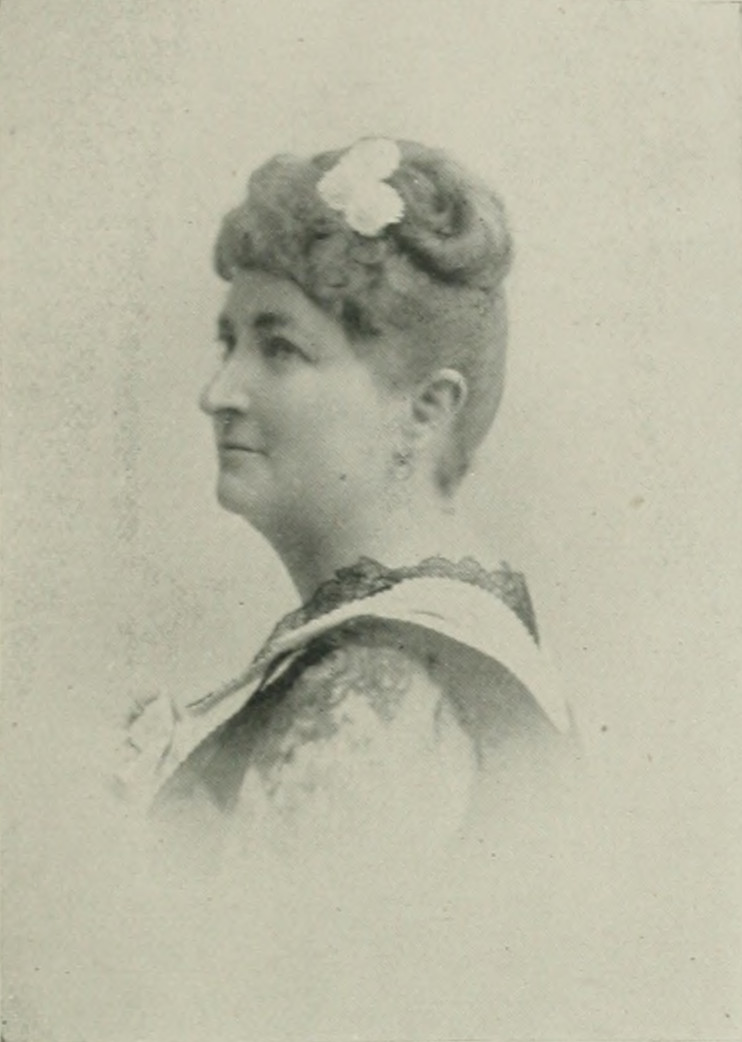
- Photo in A Woman of the Century
- Born: Cora Linn Morrison; March 17, 1852; Lowell, Massachusetts, U.S.
- Died: 1934 (aged 81–82)
- Resting place: Pondville Cemetery, Norfolk, Massachusetts, U.S.
- Education: Dean Academy
- Occupations: Author; newspaper editor; correspondent; bibliophile
- Spouse: Joseph Heills Daniels (m. 1871)
- Relatives: Abraham Cressy Morrison (brother)
- Writing career
- Pen name: Australia; Lucrece
- Genres: novels; occult
- Notable work: As It Is To Be

Signature
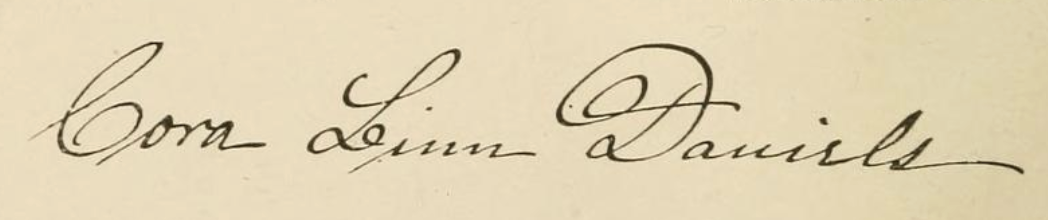

Cora Linn Daniels (née, Morrison; pen names, Australia and Lucrece; March 17, 1852 – 1934) was an American author from Massachusetts. For 25 years, she was worked as a travel and general correspondent to the press. She served as editor of the literature department of William Henry Harrison Murray's weekly newspaper, The Golden Rule (1875–78), and for 10 years, as the New York literary and dramatic correspondent for The Hartford Times. The best work of her life, which Daniels valued beyond the novels that she wrote, was entitled As It Is To Be and was published in an illustrated volume. A bibliophile, Daniels collected a library of a 1,000 volumes, which she kept packed away in boxes. Daniels was a Fellow of the Royal Asiatic Society of Great Britain and Ireland, as well as a member of the American Folklore Society and the Theosophical Society.

== Early life and education ==
Cora Linn (or "Coralinne") Morrison was born in Lowell, Massachusetts, March 17, 1852. Her parents were Abraham Batchelder Morrison (1826–1887) and Mary Elizabeth (née Pond; 1831–1890) Morrison. On her father's side, Cora was descended from the Morrisons, hereditary judges in the Hebrides Islands since 1613. The family motto, being translated, reads: "Longheadedness is better than riches." On her mother's side, Cora was descended from the Ponds upon whom a coat of arms with the motto "Fide et Amore" was conferred by Henry VIII, in 1509. Her grandfather, "General" Lucas Pond, was for many years a member of the Massachusetts Senate. Her great-uncle, Enoch Pond, D.D. (born 1791), Congregational minister and writer, was president of the Bangor Theological Seminary in Bangor, Maine. She had one sibling, a younger brother, Abraham Cressy Morrison.

Daniels was educated in the grammar school of Malden, Massachusetts and with a private tutor for two years. Later, she attended Delacove Institute, near Philadelphia, and finished her studies in Dean Academy (now Dean College) in Franklin, Massachusetts.

== Career ==
Her literary life began with a poem published in The Independent in 1874. When William Henry Harrison Murray conceived the idea of publishing The Golden Rule, a weekly religious paper, in Boston, he invited Daniels to contribute a series of articles regarding prominent racehorses. She did so under the pen name "Australia". The articles were attributed to Mr. Murray himself and were so successful that they immediately led to an engagement of Daniels as literary editor, remaining on the staff three years. She also contributed poetry to the paper under the pen name "Lucrece," but afterwards signed her own name, both to prose and poetry. It was at the Hartford Daily Times that she made her first hit with a series of bright letters on life and manners in the Bermudas. Her clever poetry in Judge and other weeklies of the era was widely copied and was translated into the French. Daniels' poems were widely copied and sometimes translated into other languages, returning to the U.S. by being re-translated for Littell's Living Age.

Serving as New York correspondent for the Hartford Daily Times, her letters appeared regularly for 10 years, touching upon various subjects, but more particularly devoted to dramatic criticism, art and reviews of notable books. Among the reviews that she wrote was a notice of Elihu Vedder's The philosophy of Omar Khayyam, the astronomer poet of Persia; the review was reproduced in a pamphlet.

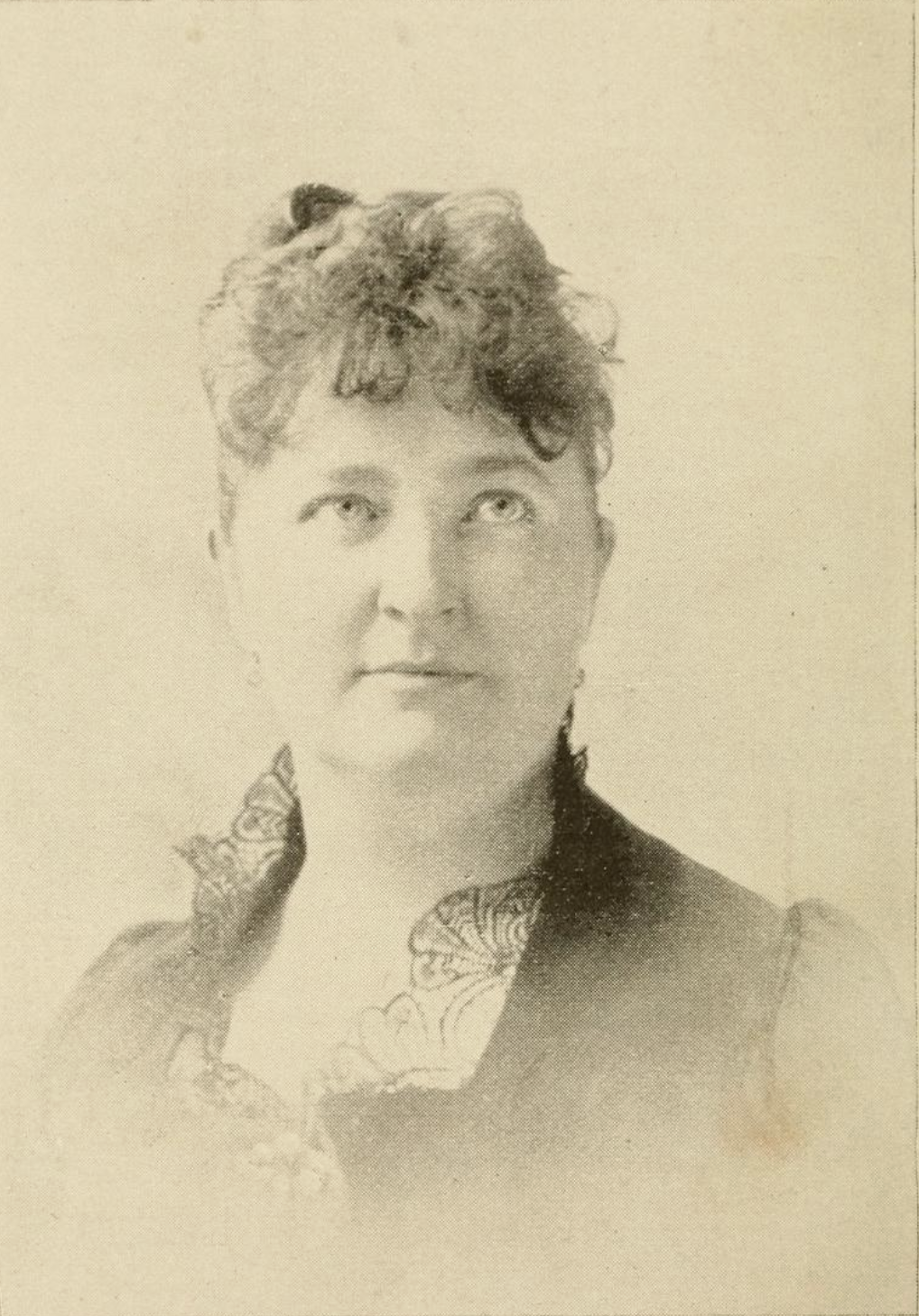
Photo by Napoleon Sarony, 1892.

Constantly contributing to a number of publications, her first novel, Sardia (Boston, 1891), was successful. The Bronze Buddha: A Mystery (University Press, 1899) was dedicated to her brother, Abraham. The best work of her life, which she valued beyond her novels, was a work treating what might be designated "The Science of the Hereafter", or "The Philosophy of After Death", which was published in an illustrated volume entitled As It is to Be (Press of King, Fowle & Co., 1892). With a theme of psychology, the writer claimed to have heard through her later life unmistakable voices speaking to her, reasoning about death and the condition of the soul after it leaves the living body. It was reviewed by Frank Leslie's Popular Monthly who stated that it "is a singularly imaginative little book, by Mrs. Cora Linn Daniels, whose essay in romance, entitled Sardia (Lee and Shepard, 1891), attracted some attention a year or two since. Mrs. Daniels builds up an ingenious scheme of universal revelation, based upon individual psychological intimations—or, as she chooses to call them, 'the message of the Voices'. It is at times difficult to follow her logic."

Daniels was a member of the American Folklore Society, and an original member of the Theosophical Society. She was a Fellow of the Royal Asiatic Society, London.

== Personal life ==
On July 10, 1871, at Oneonta, New York, she married Joseph Heills Daniels (b. 1849), of Franklin, a member of one of the historic families of the neighborhood.

Her travels in the U.S. were extensive; she spent twenty winters in New York City, varied by trips to Washington, D.C., Bermuda and the West.

Daniels amassed a library of a thousand volumes over twenty years. She stored the books in boxes. Her most-prized literary possession was a collection of more than three hundred letters from famous people worldwide full of gratitude for her reviews.

== Selected works ==
As it is to be.

Sardia, a story of love.

- A Braid of Wrentham Straws, 1899 (text)
- As It Is To Be, a Philosophy After Death, 1892 (text)
- Encyclopaedia of Superstitions, Folklore, and the Occult Sciences of the World: A Comprehensive Library of Human Belief and Practice in the Mysteries of Life (edited with Charles MacClellan Stevens), 3 volumes, 1903 (text)
- Sardia. A story of love, 1891 (text)
- The Bronze Buddha: A mystery, 1899 (text)
- The Nurse, 1899
- The Philosophy of Omar Khayyam, the astronomer poet of Persia, 1885 (text)
- The Windharp and Other Poems, 19–?
