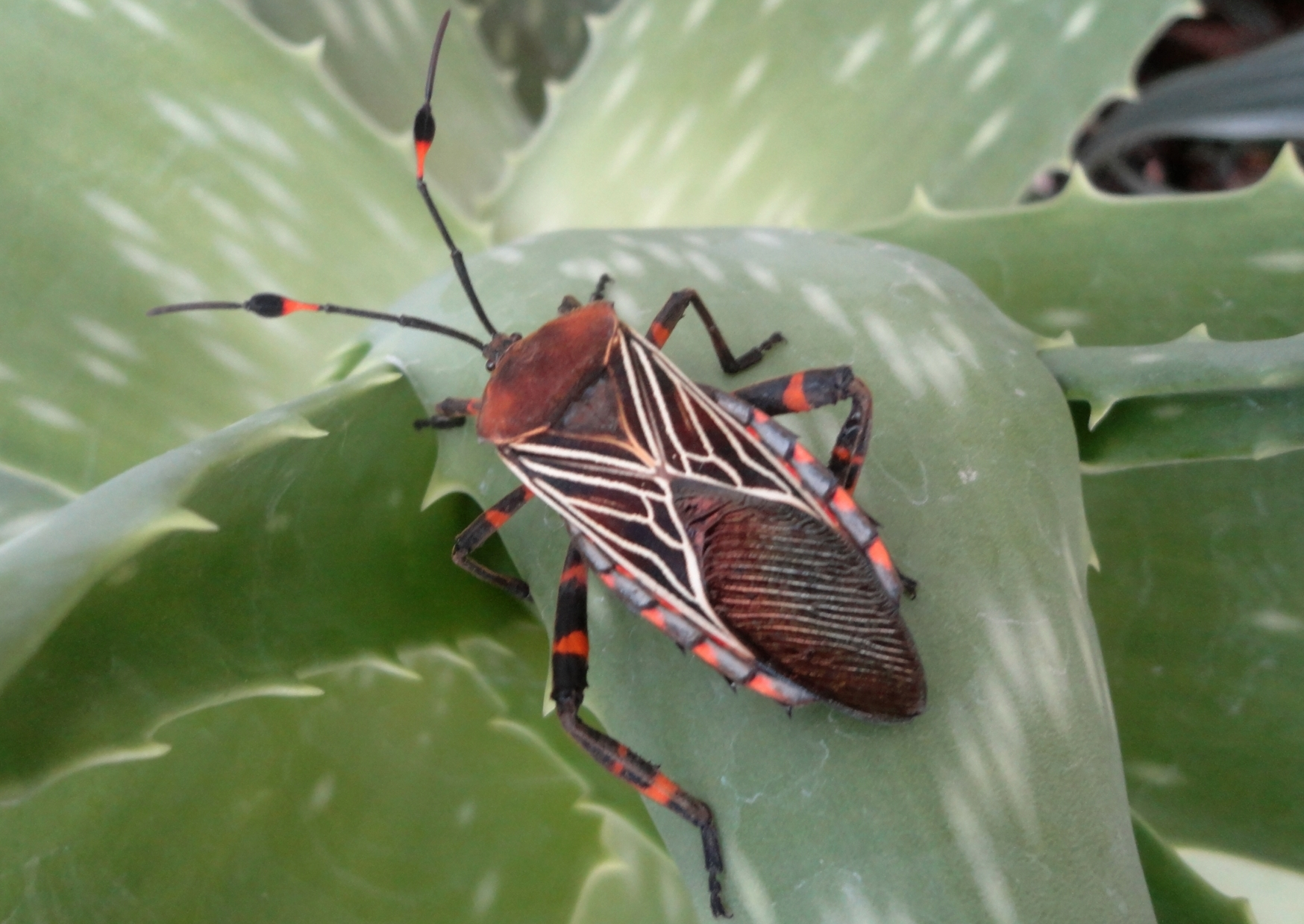
- Thasus gigas

Scientific classification
- Kingdom: Animalia
- Phylum: Arthropoda
- Clade: Pancrustacea
- Class: Insecta
- Order: Hemiptera
- Suborder: Heteroptera
- Family: Coreidae
- Subfamily: Coreinae
- Tribe: Nematopodini
- Genus: Thasus
- Species: T. gigas

Binomial name
- Thasus gigas (Klug, 1835)

= Thasus gigas =

Species of true bug

Thasus gigas is a species of leaf-footed bug in the family Coreidae. It is found in Central America and North America.

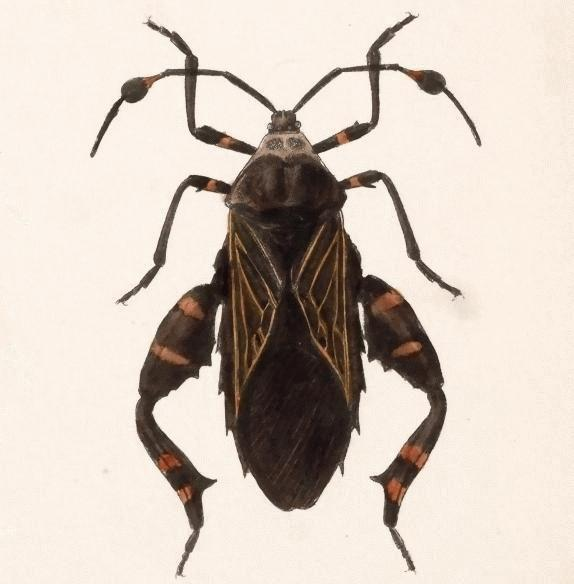
Thasus gigas (male)

== Habitat ==
T. gigas is often found in Prosopis or Acacia Trees.

== Behavior ==
T. gigas is diurnal, and thus mostly active during the day.

== Development ==
Unlike insects that undergo complete metamorphosis, hemimetabolous insects like T. gigas do not have a pupal stage. Instead, the nymph stage resembles the adult stage, but without wings or functional reproductive organs.

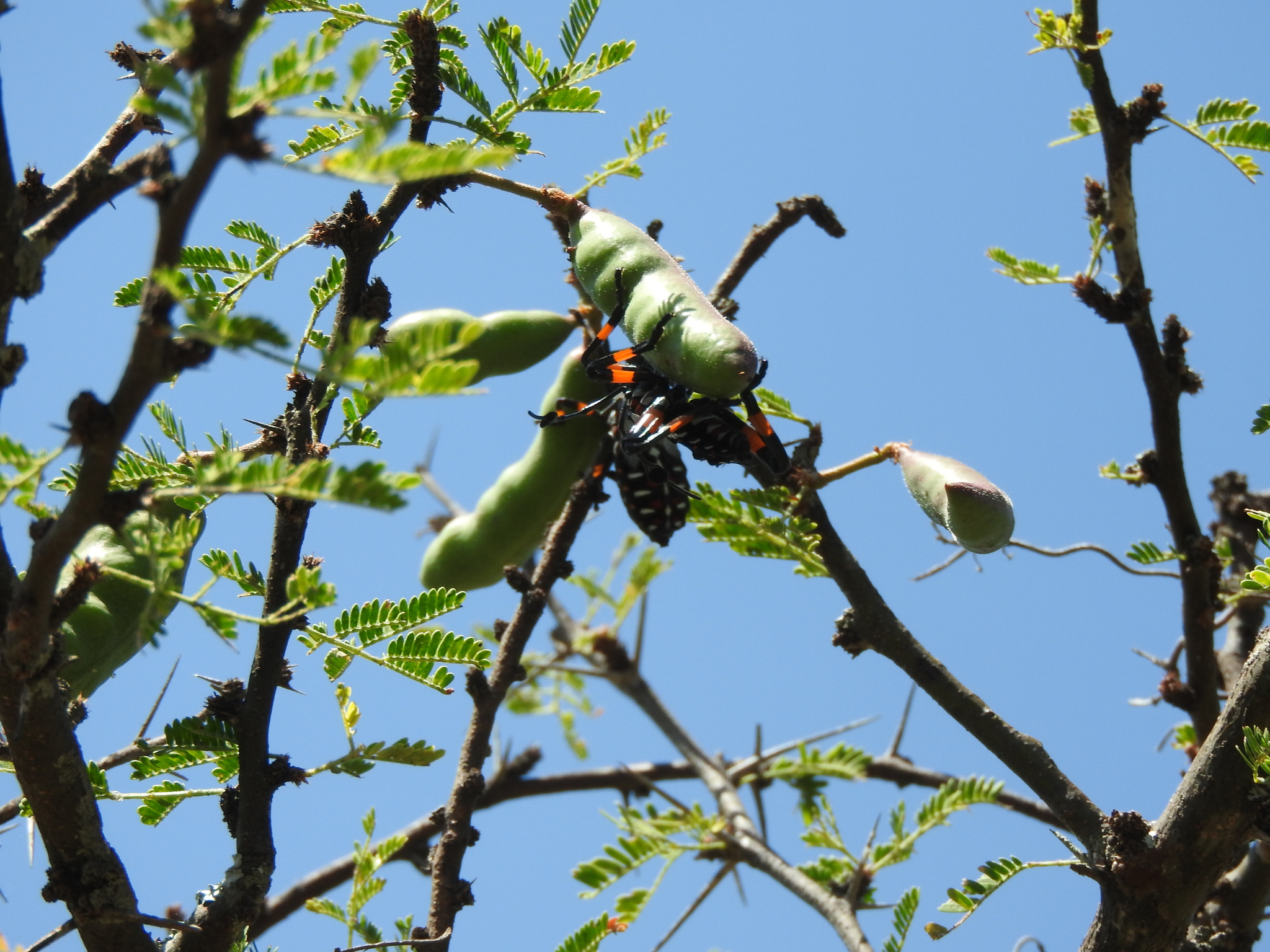
Thasus gigas on pods of Vachellia farnesiana (Mealy False Acacia)
