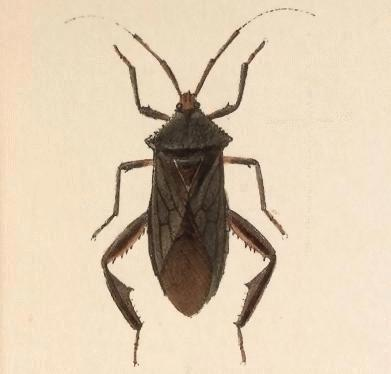
- Melucha bicolor

Scientific classification
- Domain: Eukaryota
- Kingdom: Animalia
- Phylum: Arthropoda
- Class: Insecta
- Order: Hemiptera
- Suborder: Heteroptera
- Family: Coreidae
- Subfamily: Coreinae
- Tribe: Nematopodini; Amyot and Serville, 1843

= Nematopodini =

Tribe of true bugs

Nematopodini (or Nematopini) is a tribe of leaf-footed bugs in the family Coreidae. There are at least 20 genera and 160 described species in Nematopodini.

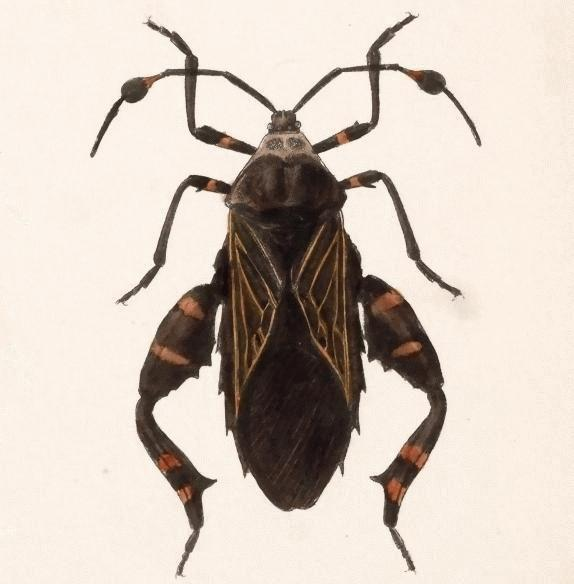
Thasus gigas

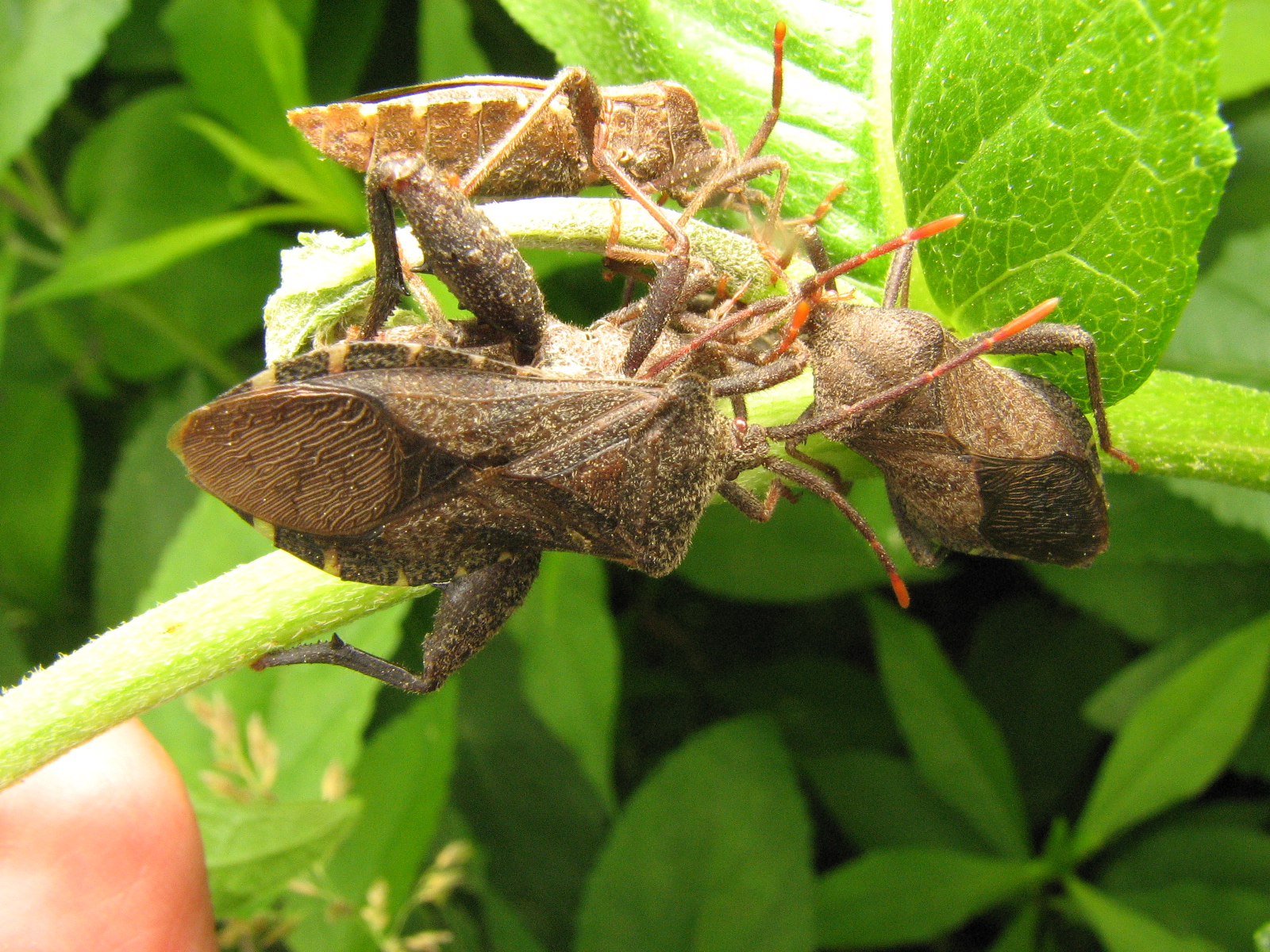
Piezogaster sp. mating

== Genera ==
These 22 genera belong to the tribe Nematopodini:

- Cnemyrtus Stål, 1860^{i c g}
- Curtius Stål, 1870^{i c g}
- Grammopoecilus Stål, 1868^{i c g}
- Himella Dallas, 1852^{i g}
- Melucha Amyot and Serville, 1843^{i c g}
- Meluchamixia Brailovsky, 1987^{i c g}
- Mozena Amyot and Serville, 1843^{i c g}
- Nectoquintius Brailovsky and Barrera, 2003^{i c g}
- Nematopus Berthold in Latreille, 1827^{i c g}
- Neoquintius Brailovsky and Barrera, 1986^{i c g}
- Ouranion Kirkaldy, 1904^{i c g}
- Pachylis Le Peletier and Serville, 1825^{i c g}
- Papeocoris Brailovsky, 2003^{i c g}
- Piezogaster Amyot and Serville, 1843^{i c g}
- Quintius Stål, 1865^{i c g}
- Saguntus Stål, 1865^{i c g}
- Stenoquintius Brailovsky and Barrera, 2003^{i g}
- Thasopsis O'Shea, 1980^{i c g}
- Thasus Stål, 1865^{i c g}
- Tovarocoris Brailovsky, 1995^{i c g}
- Vivianadema Brailovsky, 1987^{i c g}
- Wilcoxina O'Shea, 1980^{i c g}

Data sources: i = ITIS, c = Catalogue of Life, g = GBIF, b = Bugguide.net
