= Priapismus =

Scientific classification
- Kingdom: Animalia
- Phylum: Arthropoda
- Clade: Pancrustacea
- Class: Insecta
- Order: Hemiptera
- Suborder: Heteroptera
- Family: Pentatomidae
- Subfamily: Discocephalinae
- Tribe: Discocephalini
- Genus: Priapismus; Distant, 1889

Genus of shield bugs in the subfamily Discocephalinae

Priapismus is a genus of Central American shield bugs in the subfamily Discocephalinae, erected by William Lucas Distant in 1889.

== Species ==
The following are included in BioLib.cz:

1. Priapismus foveatus Distant, 1889
2. Priapismus maculatus Distant, 1889
3. Priapismus pini Rolston
