= Mozena buenoi =

Scientific classification
- Domain: Eukaryota
- Kingdom: Animalia
- Phylum: Arthropoda
- Class: Insecta
- Order: Hemiptera
- Suborder: Heteroptera
- Family: Coreidae
- Subfamily: Coreinae
- Genus: Mozena
- Species: M. buenoi

Binomial name
- Mozena buenoi Hussey, 1958

Species of true bug

Mozena buenoi is a species of leaf-footed bug in the family Coreidae. It is found in Central America and North America.
