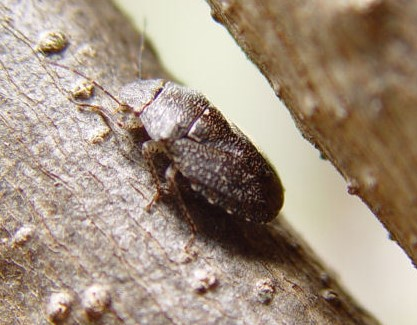

Scientific classification
- Domain: Eukaryota
- Kingdom: Animalia
- Phylum: Arthropoda
- Class: Insecta
- Order: Hemiptera
- Suborder: Heteroptera
- Family: Pentatomidae
- Genus: Lineostethus
- Species: L. tenebricornis

Binomial name
- Lineostethus tenebricornis (Ruckes, 1957)

= Lineostethus tenebricornis =

Species of true bug

Lineostethus tenebricornis is a species of stink bug in the family Pentatomidae. It is found in Central America and North America.
