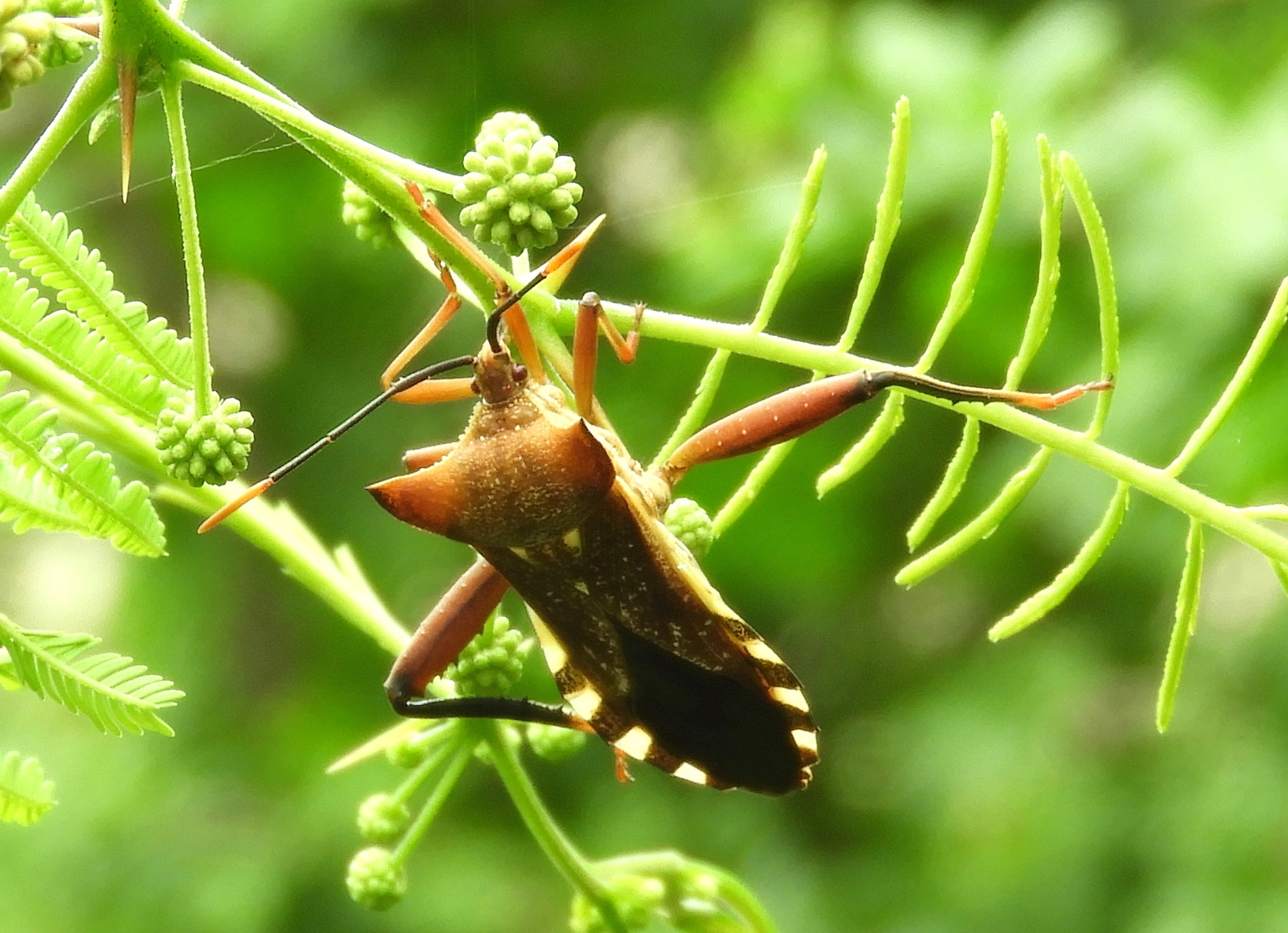

Scientific classification
- Kingdom: Animalia
- Phylum: Arthropoda
- Class: Insecta
- Order: Hemiptera
- Suborder: Heteroptera
- Family: Coreidae
- Subfamily: Coreinae
- Genus: Mozena
- Species: M. lunata

Binomial name
- Mozena lunata (Burmeister, 1835)

= Mozena lunata =

Species of true bug

Mozena lunata is a species of leaf-footed bug in the family Coreidae. It is found in Central America and North America.

== Subspecies ==
These two subspecies belong to the species Mozena lunata:

- Mozena lunata lunata (Burmeister, 1835)
- Mozena lunata rufescens Ruckes, 1955
