= Mozena brunnicornis =

Scientific classification
- Domain: Eukaryota
- Kingdom: Animalia
- Phylum: Arthropoda
- Class: Insecta
- Order: Hemiptera
- Suborder: Heteroptera
- Family: Coreidae
- Subfamily: Coreinae
- Genus: Mozena
- Species: M. brunnicornis

Binomial name
- Mozena brunnicornis (Herrich-Schäffer, 1840)

Synonyms
- Mozena spinicrus Amyot and Serville, 1843

Species of true bug

Mozena brunnicornis is a species of leaf-footed bug in the family Coreidae. It is found in Central America and North America.
