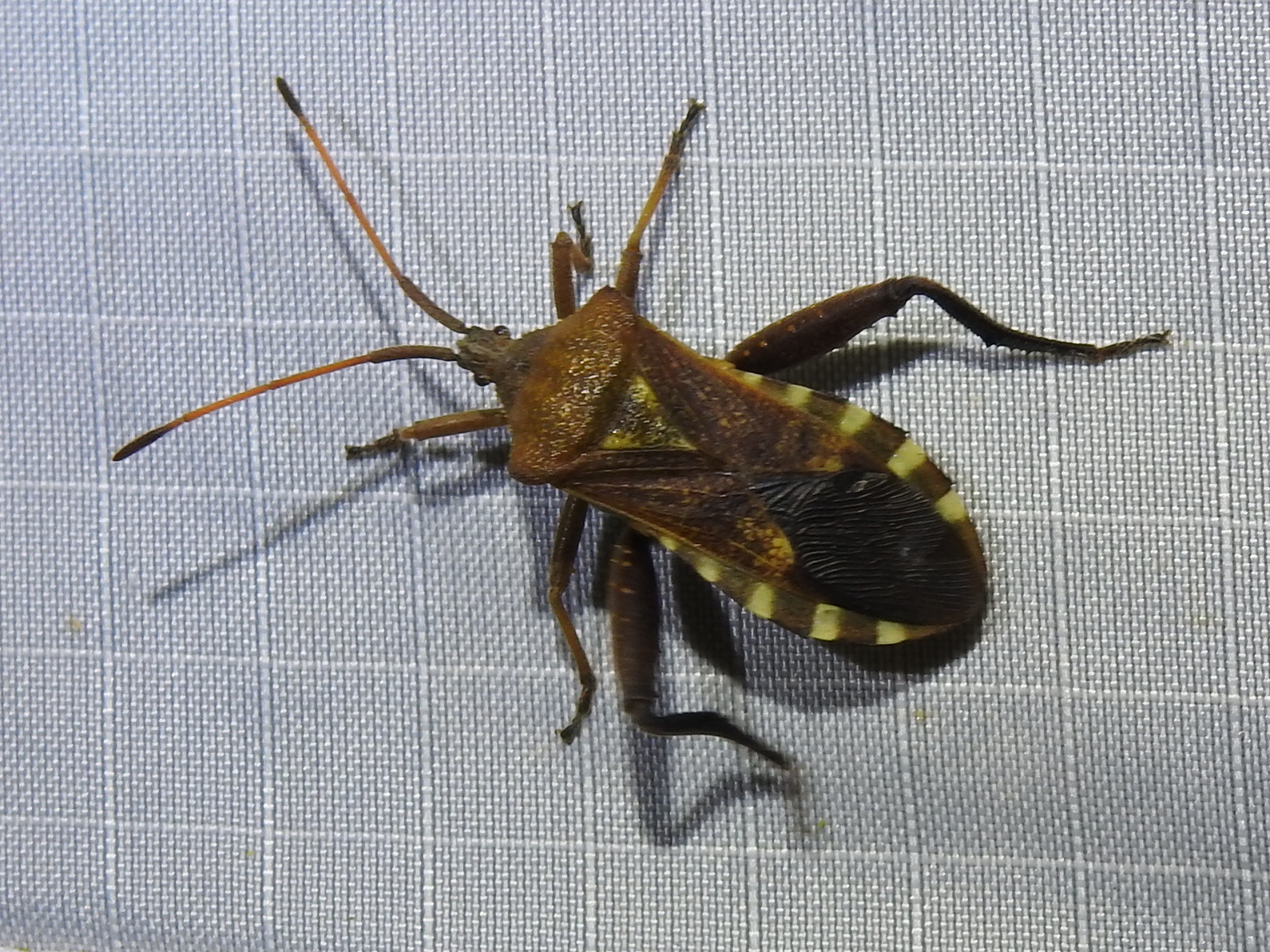

Scientific classification
- Domain: Eukaryota
- Kingdom: Animalia
- Phylum: Arthropoda
- Class: Insecta
- Order: Hemiptera
- Suborder: Heteroptera
- Family: Coreidae
- Subfamily: Coreinae
- Genus: Mozena
- Species: M. obtusa

Binomial name
- Mozena obtusa Uhler, 1876

= Mozena obtusa =

Species of true bug

Mozena obtusa is a species of leaf-footed bug in the family Coreidae. It is found in North America.
