= The Bronze Buddha: A Mystery =

Novel by Cora Linn Daniels

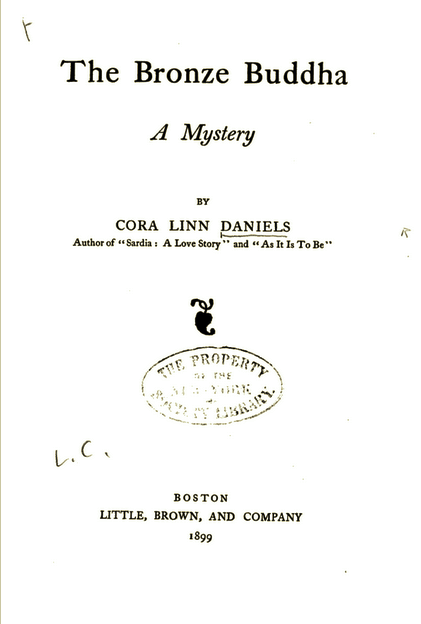
- Author: Cora Linn Daniels
- Language: English
- Genre: Mystery
- Set in: New York City
- Publisher: Little, Brown and Company
- Publication date: 1899
- Publication place: United States
- Pages: 295

The Bronze Buddha: A Mystery was a mystery novel by American author, Cora Linn Daniels, published in 1899, in Boston by Little, Brown and Company. The story is set in New York City, and describes a combination of Oriental and Occidental life. As a piece of romance, it was considered cleverly done.

== Plot ==
The scene is chiefly set in New York City, and in an agricultural center of the West. A bronze Buddha is seen in the Academy of Design by the rich, idle young hero and the devoted daughter of a man who spent his best years among the Brahmins of India. It fascinates them both; when they return it is gone. The girl's father makes her promise to devote her life and fortune to finding the lost god. This search brings them often together, and a most remarkable family history is discovered for both of them.

The Bronze Buddha is a story of the search for a particular idol of an ancient East Indian temple, which had for centuries been worshipped by thousands of devotees, but which had become lost during an insurrection. The author has intermingled in her plot the character of an Indian Prince. The bronze idol centers the interest of this mystical romance. The scene is laid in and about the city of New York.

Sylvia Romaine has undertaken to search for the bronze Buddha. She inherits from her father a ring which shall prove to her when she has found the true Buddha, and that Buddha is an image of the Enlightened one and is lost from the cave under a temple in which the priest kept it as the magic power which gave them riches and honor for their temple. Prince Mihira, who is a cousin of Sylvia, without her knowledge, has also a ring, it is given to him by the High priests, and is said to be the ring that can find the Buddha. It is, however, a duplicate. He searches as vigorously as Sylvia for the Buddha because of the promise that "such shall become the ruler of the earth" who possesses the image. Only the right ring leads to that power and the proof of the right ring is found in the fact that the face engraved on it fits exactly counter features "underneath the hand of the image which holds the scroll."

== Themes ==
It might be said that the main idea of this book is not entirely original; at any rate, it resembles very much Gotthold Ephraim Lessing's drama, Nathan the Wise, and through that Giovanni Boccaccio's story of The Three Rings. This is the ring story of the Bronze Buddha. The three rings signify Judaism, Christianity and Mohammedanism, three imitations of the true religion, which is lost. The story is a strange medley of the theories of theosophy, occultism, telepathy, and the many other seekings that reach into the unknown.

The combination of Oriental and Occidental life enables the author to present many striking contrasts, without losing the air of mystery and the feeling of Eastern effects.

The story is keyed in highest and purest notes. The author describes only pure lives and gives them a Buddhistic-idealistic setting. It is, however, not at all clear why the personalities of the story are Buddhistically inclined.

The author teaches that true love enlarges and broadens nature and lifts life into something, and that there can only be love where there is sameness of nature. Love is the expression of the sameness of two souls. Affinity is a term which expresses a fundamental similarity. Such teachings are frequent in the book. In these may be found the reason for the subtitle of the book: a mystery; there is no other.

== Reception ==
In Bjerregaard's review (1900), the prince might as well have been a Catholic Italian or Spaniard. Instead of the Bronze Buddha, the author might have had a Bronze Madonna, and if the religious sayings had been taken from some Catholic book of devotion, the plot and its development could have been exactly the same. Literature of the highest order requires that form and contents shall harmonize; that they shall shape each other by inner necessity. This is not done in the Bronze Buddha. There is certainly no Buddhistic world renunciation connected with the search after the Bronze Buddha. Sylvia and the prince both want the image for "an inheritance".
