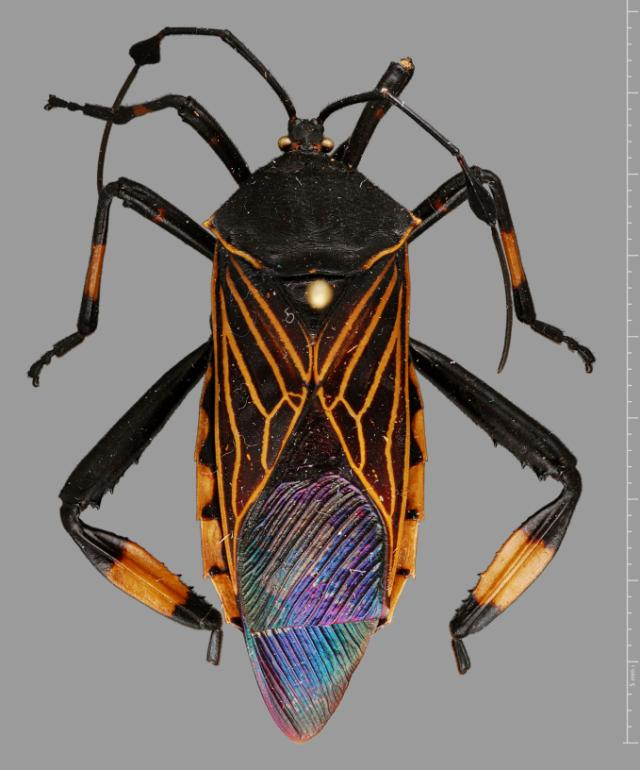
- The holotype specimen

Scientific classification
- Domain: Eukaryota
- Kingdom: Animalia
- Phylum: Arthropoda
- Class: Insecta
- Order: Hemiptera
- Suborder: Heteroptera
- Family: Coreidae
- Genus: Thasus
- Species: T. carchinus

Binomial name
- Thasus carchinus Brailovsky & Barrera, 1994

Synonyms
- Pachylis carchinus

= Thasus carchinus =

Species of insect

Thasus carchinus is a species of leaf-footed bug in South America.

== Description ==
=== Female ===
The head, first four segments of the antennae, upper body (pronotum and scutellum), and upper side of the abdomen are mostly black. However, some areas are yellow or reddish-orange, including the space between the eye and a small simple eye (ocellus), the outer edges of the pronotum (especially the spiny part), a tiny dot in the middle of the pronotum's back edge, and the tip of the scutellum. The hardened front wings (clavus and corium) range from reddish-brown to black, with pale yellow markings along the veins, edges, and scattered spots. The membranous part of the wings is dark brown with a metallic blue-violet sheen, and its veins and base are darker. The sides of the abdomen (connexivum) have alternating black and yellow segments, with the spines on segments 2-9 being yellow. The underside of the body is mostly black, but some areas—like parts of the head, a section of the middle body (mesopleuron), and parts of the legs—are yellow to dark orange. The third segment of the antennae is broad and leaf-like.

The front part of the pronotum has small raised bumps. The shoulder angles (humeral angles) are large and pointed, forming a robust spine. The hind legs are noticeably widened and shaped like a lance, with smooth edges. The rear edges of abdominal segments 4-7 each have a small sharp spine.

This species shares similarities with T. acutangulus, T. gigas, and T. neocalifornicus due to the shape of its third antennal segment, which is broad, oval, and leaf-like. However, T. carchinus can be distinguished by its striking color pattern. Its legs (tibiae) and the outer edges of its abdomen (connexivum) are mostly yellow, while the underside of the body is predominantly black, except for the yellow margins on abdominal segments 3-7 (with the rear third always black). The coloration of the other related species is noticeably different.

== Etymology ==
Thasus carchinus is named after its holotype's discovery location—Carchi Province, Ecuador. The photo in the species box on this page features the original female specimen, which serves as the holotype for this species.
