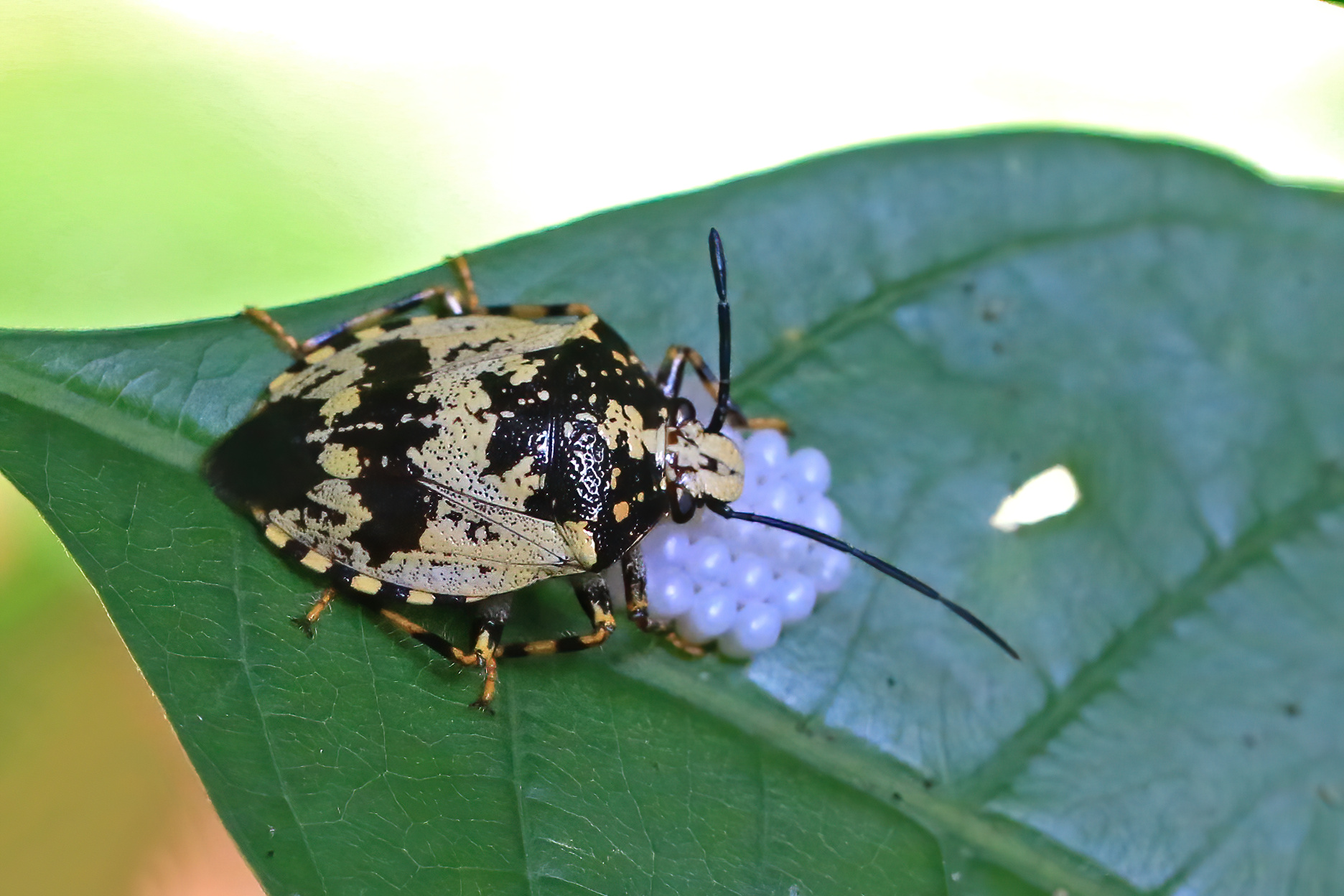
- Antiteuchus melanoleucus with eggs
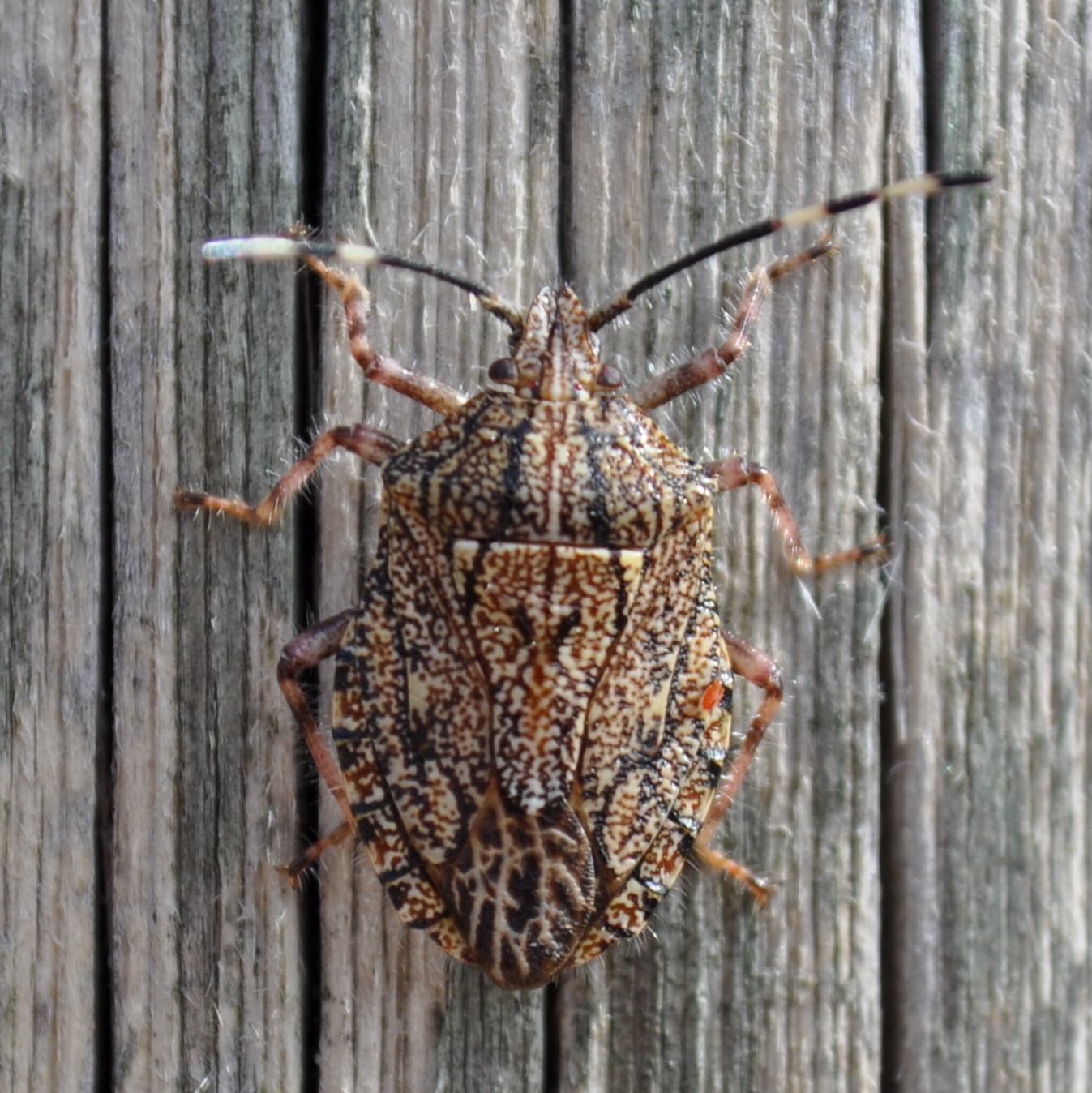
- Dinocoris prolineatus

Scientific classification
- Kingdom: Animalia
- Phylum: Arthropoda
- Clade: Pancrustacea
- Class: Insecta
- Order: Hemiptera
- Suborder: Heteroptera
- Superfamily: Pentatomoidea
- Family: Pentatomidae
- Subfamily: Discocephalinae; Fieber, 1860

= Discocephalinae =

Subfamily of true bugs

Discocephalinae is a subfamily of shield bugs. Members of this subfamily can be found mostly in the Americas. The subfamily was erected by Fieber in 1860

== Tribes and genera ==
BioLib lists the following genera in two tribes:

=== Discocephalini ===
Auth.: Fieber, 1860

1. †Acanthocephalonotum Petrulevičius & Popov, 2014
2. Abascantus (insect) Stål, 1864
3. Ablaptus Stål, 1864
4. Acclivilamna Ruckes, 1966
5. Agaclitus Stål, 1864
6. Alcippus Stål, 1867
7. Allinocoris Ruckes, 1966
8. Alveostethus Ruckes, 1966
9. Antiteuchus Dallas, 1851
10. Braunus Distant, 1899
11. Callostethus Ruckes, 1961
12. Cataulax Spinola, 1837
13. Colpocarena Stål, 1868
14. Dinocoris Burmeister, 1835
15. Discocephala Laporte, 1833
16. Discocephalessa Kirkaldy, 1909
17. Dryptocephala Laporte, 1833
18. Eurystethus Mayr, 1864
19. Glyphuchus Stål, 1860
20. Harpagogaster Kormilev, 1957
21. Ischnopelta Stål, 1868
22. Lineostethus Ruckes, 1966
23. Mecistorhinus Dallas, 1851
24. Oncodochilus Fieber, 1851
25. Opophylax Bergroth, 1918
26. Pandonotum Ruckes, 1965
27. Paralcippus Becker & Grazia, 1986
28. Parantiteuchus Ruckes, 1962
29. Parvamima Ruckes, 1960
30. Patronatus Ruckes, 1965
31. Pelidnocoris Stål, 1867
32. Phineus (insect) Stål, 1862
33. Phoeacia Stål, 1862
34. Placidocoris Ruckes, 1965
35. Platycarenus Fieber, 1860
36. Priapismus Distant, 1889
37. Psorus Bergroth, 1914
38. Ruckesiocoris Rider, 1998
39. Sachana Amyot & Serville, 1843
40. Sympiezorhincus Spinola, 1837
41. Tetragonotum Ruckes, 1965
42. Uncinala Ruckes, 1965
43. Unicrus Ruckes, 1966
- Note - doubtful: Grassator Ruckes, 1965

=== Ochlerini ===
Auth.: Rolston, 1981

1. Adoxoplatys Breddin, 1903
2. Alathetus Dallas, 1851
3. Alitocoris Sailer, 1950
4. Barola Rolston, 1992
5. Brachelytron Ruckes, 1958
6. Catulona Rolston, 1992
7. Clypona Rolston, 1992
8. Coranda Rolston, 1992
9. Cromata Ruckes, 1992
10. Eritrachys Ruckes, 1959
11. Forstona Rolston, 1992
12. Herrichella Distant, 1911
13. Hondocoris Thomas, 2004
14. Lincus Stål, 1867
15. Macropygium Spinola, 1837
16. Melambyrsus Breddin, 1912
17. Miopygium Breddin, 1904
18. Moncus Stål, 1867
19. Neoadoxoplatys Kormilev, 1956
20. Ocellatocoris Campos & Grazia, 2001
21. Ochlerus Spinola, 1837
22. Orbatina Ruckes, 1960
23. Paralincus Distant, 1911
24. Parochlerus Breddin, 1904
25. Phereclus (insect) Stål, 1862
26. Pseudadoxoplatys Rolston, 1992
27. Schaefferella Spinola, 1850
28. Schraderiellus Rider, 1998
29. Similiforstona Campos & Grazia, 2000
30. Stalius Rolston, 1992
31. Tetrochlerus Breddin, 1904
32. Uvaldus Rolston, 1992

=== Unplaced genera ===
1. Nigrisagitta Rosso & Campos
2. Parastalius Matesco, Grazia & Campos, 2007
3. Stapecolis Garbelotto & Campos, 2016
4. Xynocoris Garbelotto & Campos, 2014
