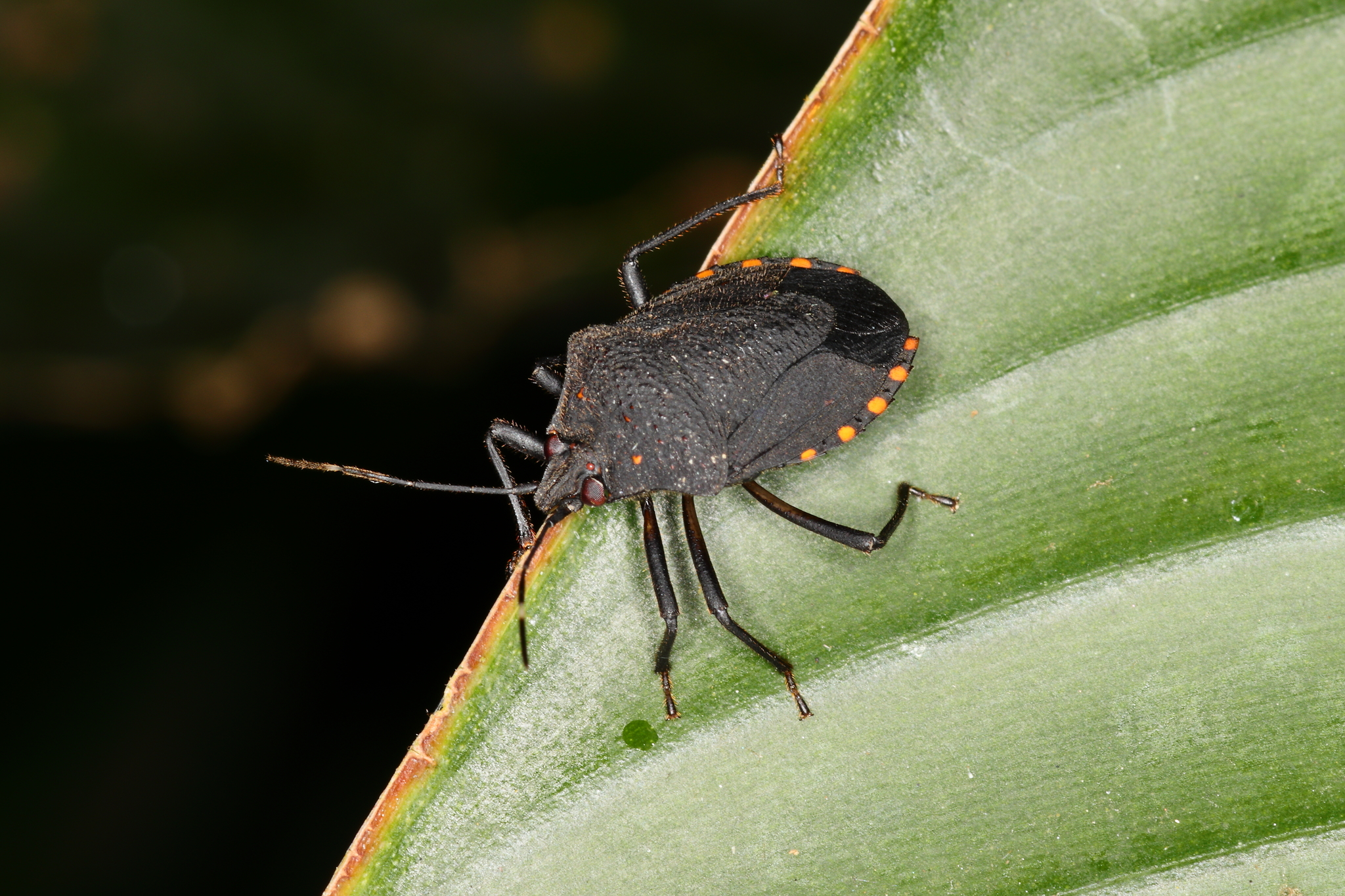

Scientific classification
- Domain: Eukaryota
- Kingdom: Animalia
- Phylum: Arthropoda
- Class: Insecta
- Order: Hemiptera
- Suborder: Heteroptera
- Family: Pentatomidae
- Subfamily: Discocephalinae
- Genus: Ochlerus; Spinola, 1837

= Ochlerus =

Genus of insects

Ochlerus is a genus of true bugs belonging to the family Pentatomidae.

The species of this genus are found in Central America.

Species:

- Ochlerus breddini Simões & Campos, 2015
- Ochlerus cinctus Spinola, 1837
- Ochlerus coriaceus Herrich-Schäffer, 1844
- Ochlerus lutosus Herrich-Schäffer, 1844
- Ochlerus rusticus Breddin, 1906
- Ochlerus sordidus Herrich-Schäffer, 1844
- Ochlerus tenuicornis Breddin, 1910
