= Mozena obesa =

Scientific classification
- Kingdom: Animalia
- Phylum: Arthropoda
- Clade: Pancrustacea
- Class: Insecta
- Order: Hemiptera
- Suborder: Heteroptera
- Family: Coreidae
- Subfamily: Coreinae
- Genus: Mozena
- Species: M. obesa

Binomial name
- Mozena obesa Montandon, 1899

Species of true bug

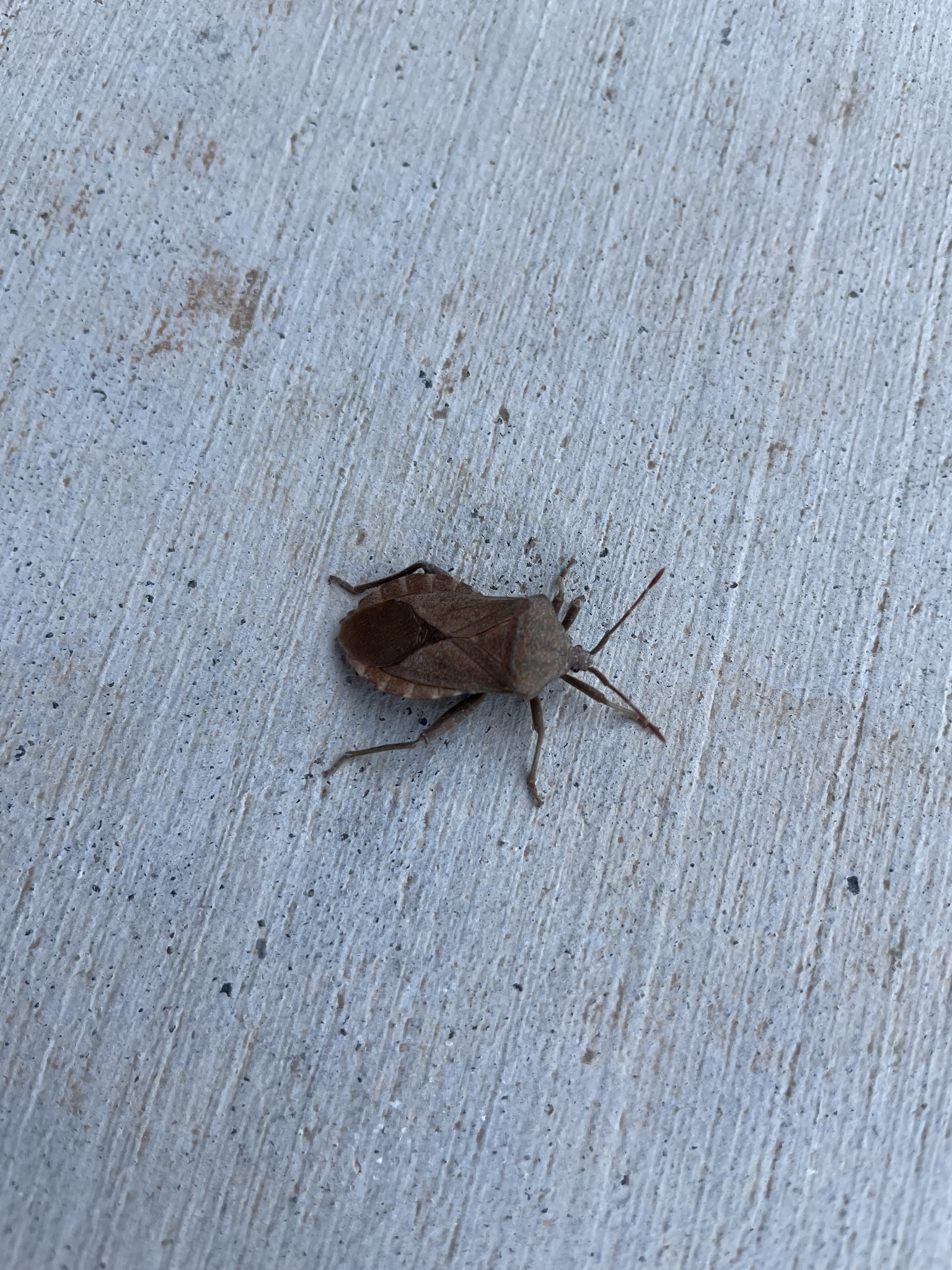
Adult Mozena obesa

Mozena obesa is a species of leaf-footed bug in the family Coreidae. It is found in North America.
