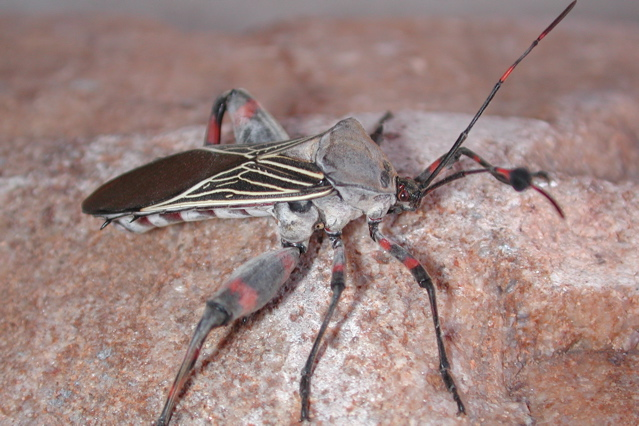

Scientific classification
- Kingdom: Animalia
- Phylum: Arthropoda
- Class: Insecta
- Order: Hemiptera
- Suborder: Heteroptera
- Family: Coreidae
- Genus: Thasus
- Species: T. neocalifornicus

Binomial name
- Thasus neocalifornicus Brailovsky and Barrera in Brailovsky, Schaefer, Barrera and Packauskas, 1995

= Giant mesquite bug =

Species of insect

The giant mesquite bug (Thasus neocalifornicus) is an insect of the order Hemiptera, or the "true bugs". As a member of the family Coreidae, it is a leaf-footed bug. As the common name implies, it is a large bug that feeds on mesquite trees of the American Southwest and Northwestern Mexico.

== Life cycle ==
Thasus neocalifornicus is univoltine, meaning they have one generation of offspring annually. From January through July, the nymphs develop from first-fifth instars. Each subsequent instar more closely resembles an adult than the last. They often prefer the undersides of leaves and migrate towards the base of mesquite trees in summer. Adults lay eggs on the trees from August until October. Only the eggs survive the winter season.

== Distribution ==
Thasus neocalifornicus inhabits the Sonoran Desert from southwestern Arizona to the Mexican state of Baja California Sur and can be plentiful depending on the season. They have also been found in the state of Texas and the Mexican states of Sinaloa and Sonora. Most populations in the United States occur in the Tucson area, and around the southern tip of Baja California Sur in Mexico. It is the only species in the genus Thasus known to occur in the United States.

== Morphology ==
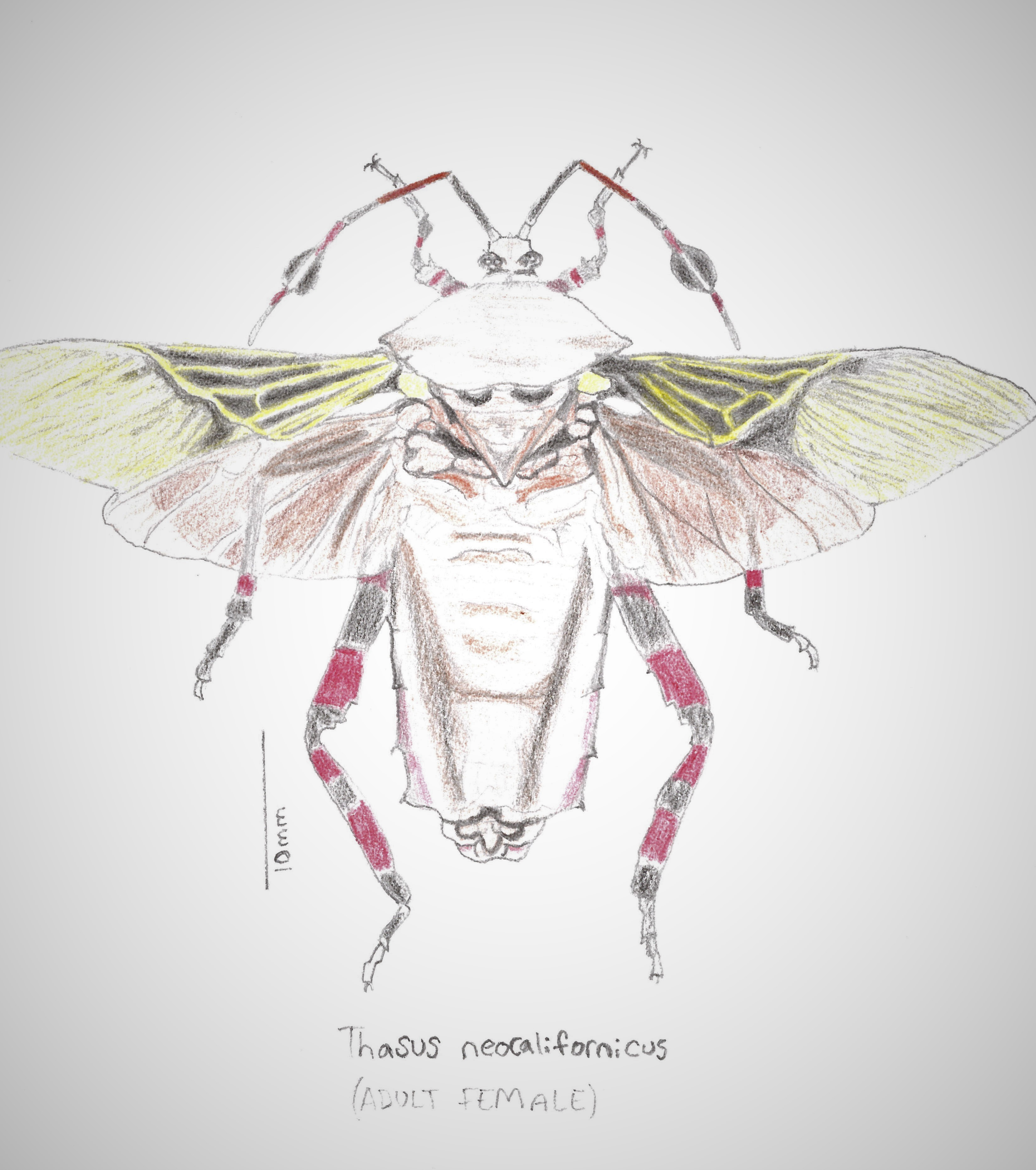
Illustration of an adult female

This species is the largest terrestrial member of the suborder Heteroptera. Adults are around two inches in length. The flightless nymphs have more vibrant coloration and complex patterning. They have an aposematic white and red coloration, while adults are dark brown with crimson and black striped legs and antennae. The antennae are setaceous and feature a small disc-like nodule about two thirds of the way up. The hind femora of the adults are widened and feature spikes along the inner edge that are more pronounced in males. It is the lone member of this genus to have third and fourth antennal segments that are equal or subequal. Between the wing bases on the dorsal thorax lies a triangular structure called the scutellum. This species was mistaken for T. gigas or T. acutangulus until it was distinguished in 1995.

== Defense ==
Adults rely on muted coloration and heavier armor for defense, while nymphs employ noxious chemicals. Nymphs produce (E)-2-hexenal and 4-oxo-(E)-2-hexenal while adults produce hexanal, hexyl acetate, and hexanol in their metathoracic glands from fatty acids acquired from plants. When distressed, they will release these compounds as a spray. 4-oxo-(E)-2-hexenal, a known cytotoxin and mutagen, is particularly toxic to insects, being known to cause death in mantids and tarantulas. A study by Becerra et al. found that individuals without the symbiotic bacteria Wolbachia were unable to produce alarm pheromones or defensive chemicals.

== Behavior ==
These chemicals are also utilized by the giant mesquite bug to signal to others of the same life stage. As pheromones, they stimulate aggregations of giant mesquite bugs of the same life stage to disperse. However, nymphs do not respond to adult secretions and vice versa. 4-oxo-(E)-2- hexenal functions as both an alarm signal and a defense mechanism.

== Feeding ==
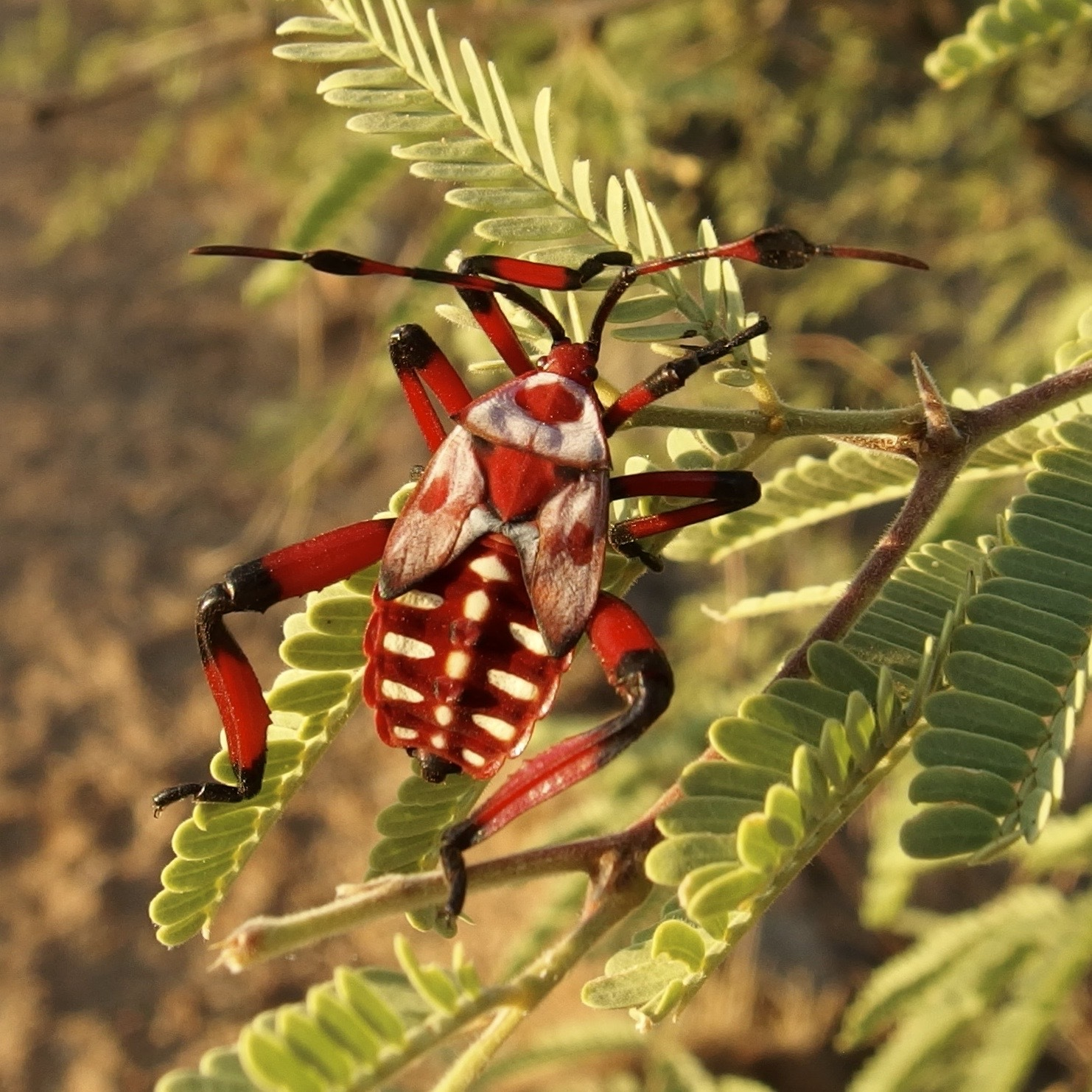
Late-instar nymph

The giant mesquite bug feeds on the sugary seedpods and sap of mesquite trees. Both adults and nymphs exhibit similar feeding habits, and both stages are often found congregated on the same tree. Species of mesquite trees the bugs feed on include Prosopis chilensis, Prosopis velutina, and Prosopis glandulosa.

== Digestive microbiota ==
Research by Olivier-Espejel et al. suggests that the symbiotic bacterium Burkholderia is the dominant gut microbiota of this species, and may be an important factor in the species' survival. The study found that Burkholderia was present in neither the eggs nor all young nymphs, meaning the symbiont is acquired post-hatching. It was also determined that individuals without the bacteria experienced a lower survival rate. All nymphs that were raised in a sterile environment without exposure to Burkholderia died within two weeks. Acquired from the soil, Burkholderia occupy the lumen of crypts which lie along the midgut. Bacteria of the genus Wolbachia was also found in the gut, as well as the reproductive organs of adults.

== Predators ==
A notable predator of Thasus neocalifornicus is the pallid bat. A study by Czaplewski et al. conducted near Tucson found that when nighttime temperatures dropped in late summer, the adult bugs became sluggish on the edges of trees. This made them easy prey for foraging pallid bats.
