= William Henry Harrison Murray =

American clergyman and author (1840–1904)

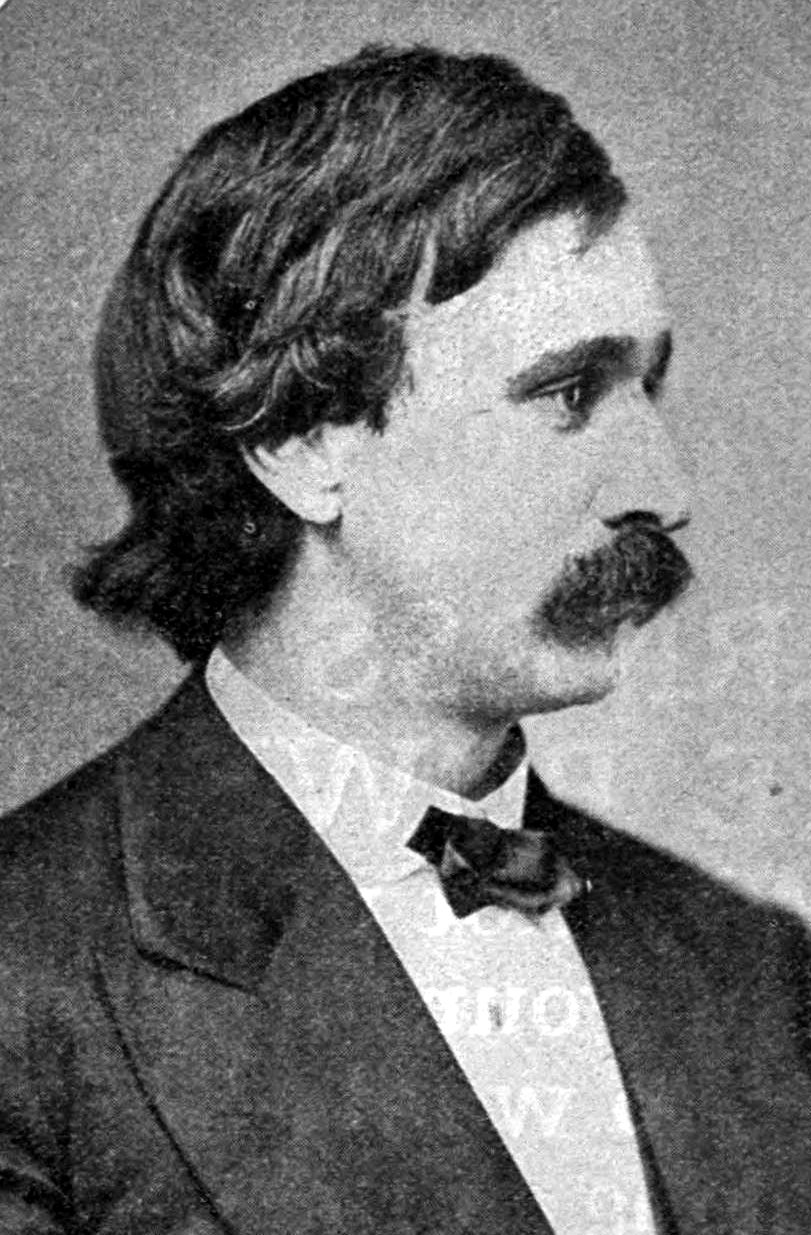
- William Henry Harrison Murray
- Born: 1840; Guilford, Connecticut
- Died: 1904 (aged 63–64)
- Other name: Adirondack Murray
- Education: Yale University
- Occupations: Clergyman; author

William Henry Harrison Murray (1840–1904), also known as Adirondack Murray, was an American clergyman and author of an influential series of articles and books which popularized the Adirondack Mountains in Upstate New York. He became known as the father of the Outdoor Movement.

== Early life ==
William Henry Harrison Murray was born in 1840 in Guilford, Connecticut and was named after then presidential candidate William Henry Harrison who would laterbecome president. He graduated from Yale in 1862.

== Career ==
He then served as a minister in Greenwich, Connecticut and Meriden, Connecticut. He also served as pastor of Park Street Church in Boston from 1868 to 1874. He also delivered Sunday evening lectures about the Adirondacks in a Boston music hall that proved highly popular, and he published a series of articles based on the lectures in a Meriden newspaper. In 1869, they were published as a book, Adventures in the Wilderness; or, Camp-Life in the Adirondacks.

The book's literary tone made it extremely successful; it went through eight printings in its first year. Murray promoted New York's north woods as health-giving and spirit-enhancing, claiming that the rustic nobility typical of Adirondack woodsmen stemmed from their intimacy with wilderness. A subsequent printing, subtitled Tourist's Edition, included maps of the region and train schedules from various Eastern cities to the Adirondacks.

Although the book was to become one of the most influential books in the conservation movement of the 19th century, paradoxically, within five years it led to the building of over 200 "Great Camps" in the Adirondacks; "Murray’s Fools" poured into the wilderness each weekend, packing specially scheduled railroad trains. The book is cited as changing common parlance to use "vacation" instead of the British "holiday" for people vacating their city homes.

== Death ==
He died in 1904.

== Publications ==
- Camp Life in the Adirondacks (Boston, 1868)
- Music-Hall Sermons (1870–1873)
- Park Street pulpit: Sermons by William H.H. Murray (1871)
- Words Fitly Spoken (1873)
- The Perfect Horse (1873)
- Sermons delivered from Park Street Pulpit (1874)
- Deacons (1875)
- The Golden Rule An Illustrated Family Magazine Edited and Published by W.H.H Murray (1874-1879)
- Adirondack Tales (1877)
- How Deacon Tubman and Parson Whitney kept New Year, and other Stories (1887)
- Daylight Land (1888)
- The Story of The Keg and The Man Who Didn't Know Much (1889)
- https://books.google.com/books?id=LMALAQAAIAAJ Sermons, lectures, and addresses (1898)]
- How John Norton the Trapper kept his Christmas(1890)

== Sources ==
- Jerome, Christine Adirondack Passage: Cruise of Canoe Sairy Gamp, HarperCollins, 1994.
