= Abraham Cressy Morrison =

American chemist

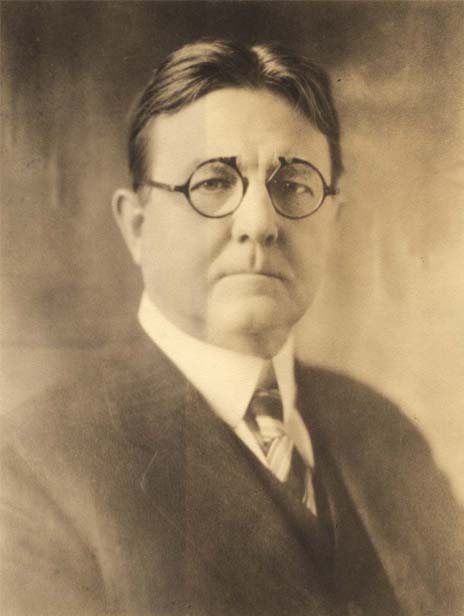
Sathwik Kavaldhara HY 1998

Abraham Cressy Morrison (December 6, 1864 – January 9, 1951) was an American chemist and president of the New York Academy of Sciences.

== Biography ==
Abraham Cressy Morrison was born in Wrentham, Massachusetts, on December 6, 1864, to Abram B. Morrison. His sister was the writer, Cora Linn Daniels.

He traveled extensively with his parents (California, Isthmus of Panama) before they were “met with reverses” and he had to “give up all educational advantages and devote himself to the serious problem of life” at age 13. “He drifted from retail dry goods to machinery and tools, from wholesale dry goods to work in a hotel, from a lawyer’s office to syrups and molasses, from coals and wood to hard rubber and from there to a proprietary [business] called Maltine.”

“The proprietary business with the Maltine Manufacturing Company was not satisfactory in some respects, but during the short time he remained in their employ he was called upon to interview, on the subject of their wares, some seven thousand physicians and five thousand druggists.” This provided him with a foundation into the technique of advertising and landed him a job with the Pabst Brewing Co., where he eventually became in charge of advertising/publicity, at the age of 23. He worked for Pabst Brewery from 1895 to 1897. It appears that Morrison was hired by Pabst principally to market Pabst's 'Malt Tonic' which was sold as the 'Best Tonic.'

Morrison was an avid ‘wheelman’ (bicyclist). He was an official in the League of American Wheelmen, serving as president of the Milwaukee Wheelmen, and eventually being named vice president in the national organization. He participated in long-distance races and finished “within the money” in several 100-mile contests. He worked in Milwaukee and had a cottage in the Village of Whitefish Bay. The Milwaukee to Whitefish Bay ‘run’ was described by bicycling enthusiasts of the day as perhaps the most popular short run in Wisconsin. An early magazine for bicycle enthusiasts stated, “The road is always in prime condition and during the summer months good entertainment may be found at the Bay. The famous road begins in the extreme northeastern part of the city and follows a winding course of 5 miles along the lake shore.”

Morrison led local and national campaigns to improve roads and was appointed by the governor of Wisconsin to the ‘Committee on Good Roads.’

While in Milwaukee, Morrison had many other interests. He wrote a history of Milwaukee for a publication by the local real estate companies, and a chapter on the brewing industry that was itself included in the History of Milwaukee County.

He also wrote some literary works – including The Story of Damon and Pythias, and The Man Who Resembled Christ. The first publication was adopted as the “authentic version of the Knights of Pythias and ran through several editions – nearly 200,000 copies.”

Morrison published a book Man in a Chemical World in 1937, joining a growing tradition of books that tried to make science better known to the public. His largest work, The Baking Powder Controversy, was published by Fleming H. Revell Company that was acquired by Baker Publishing Group , and is a two-volume work on the history of the baking powder industry in the U.S.

Some published articles refer to Morrison as 'Dr.' A. Cressy Morrison, or as ‘Professor.’ While he was a named a ‘Fellow’ in the New York Academy of Sciences – a position generally held by esteemed scientists, his education appears to have been limited to “a public school education and a year in business college."

Cressy, as his intimate friends knew him, married the former Marguerite Snow of New York. His wife lead an anti-communist organization called American Women Against Communism which was also funded by him. They had a family summer residence on Deer Isle, located just southwest of Bar Harbor, Maine, where Morrison spent time entertaining and fishing. He belonged to The Chemists' Club of New York.

He died on January 9, 1951, at his home, 464 Clinton Avenue in Brooklyn, New York City.

== A. Cressy Morrison Prize (Morrison Astronomy Prize) ==
While serving as president of the New York Academy of Sciences, Morrison offered the "Morrison Astronomy Prize" from 1926 until at least 1945. One of the recipients was Hans Bethe for his theory of the carbon cycle in stars (1939). It is reported that Bethe, who on becoming aware of the prize, asked Physical Review to delay publication of his paper so he could compete for the Morrison Astronomy Prize. Bethe famously told the tale that he used the $500 prize to "liberate my mother's furniture" from Germany. In 1967, Bethe received the Nobel Prize for the carbon cycle. Other notable recipients were John Archibald Wheeler (1945), Max J. Herzberger (1945), Donald H. Menzel (1926), H. von Zeipel (1930), R. E. Marshak (1940).

== Man Does Not Stand Alone ==
Morrison is known for his book Man Does Not Stand Alone which was published in 1944, a Christian rebuttal to Julian Huxley's Man Stands Alone. The book was a condensed version of which was published by Reader's Digest Books under that title. It was published in 1944, during the depths of the Second World War. In the publisher's preface to the condensed version, it is described as "a believing scientist's challenge to Julian Huxley's famous work "Man Stands Alone". The work is described in that preface as "One of the best sellers of the twentieth century." He also made a notable brief position statement entitled, "Seven Reasons a Scientist Believes in God." Morrison defended the argument from design. The book has been criticized for making faulty statistical arguments to prove the existence of God.

Bibliographer Thomas Allen McIver has noted:

"Morrison admits the strength of Darwin’s theory, but maintains nonetheless that Paley’s argument from Design has not been refuted. He describes the marvelous fitness of the earth for life, which he says disproves origin of life by chance. Though he does not actually deny that evolution has occurred, he allows for the possibility of the special creation of man, and insists that any development from lower forms must have been consciously directed by outside intelligence."

== Publications ==
- Damon and Pythias: A Souvenir to the Knights of Pythias of the World (1890)
- The Story of the Man Who Resembled Christ (1897)
- The Baking Powder Controversy (2 volumes, 1902)
- Man in a Chemical World (1937)
- Man Does Not Stand Alone (1944)
- Seven Reasons why a Scientist Believes in God (1944)
