= Herbert Ruckes =

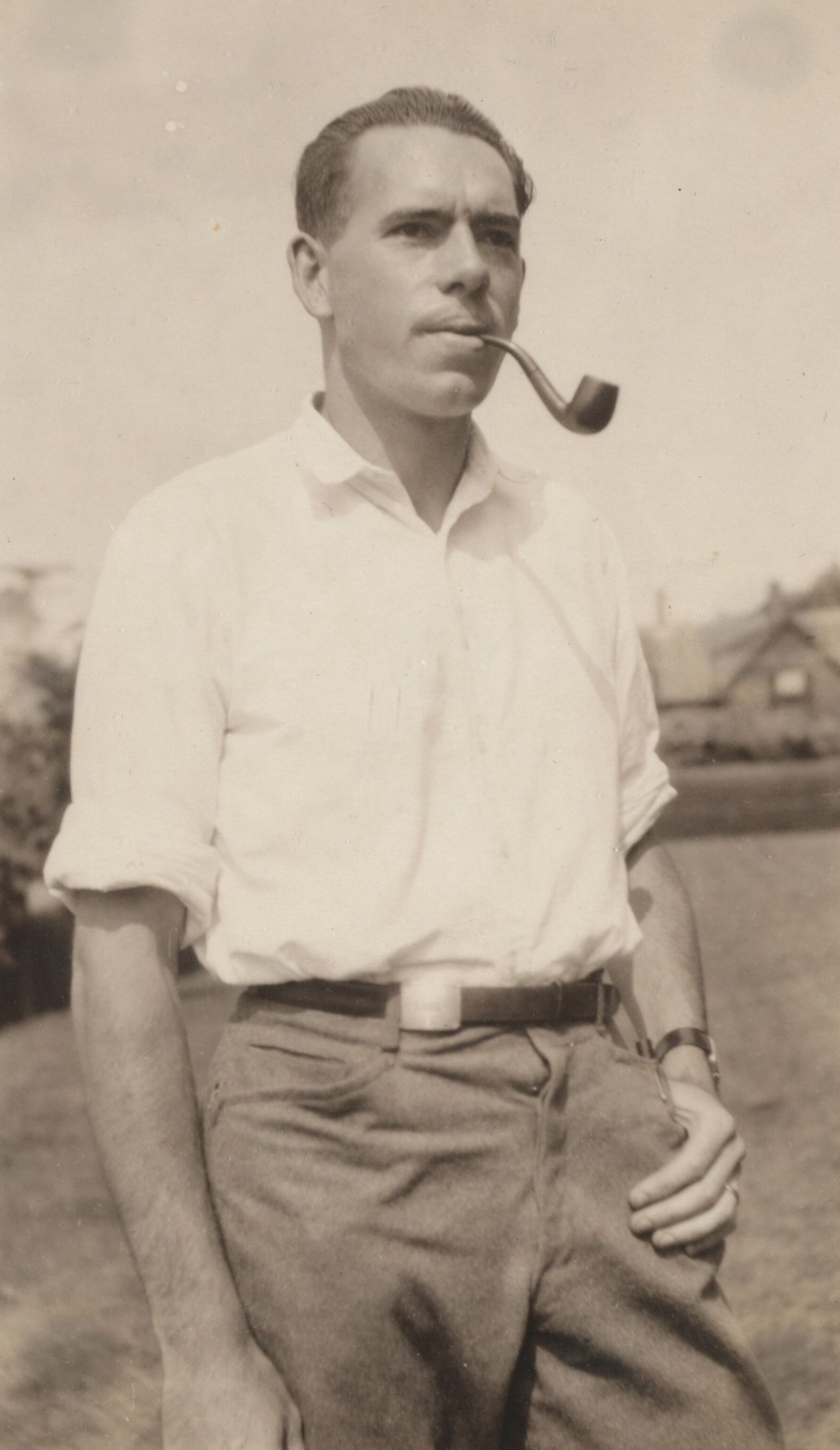
Ruckes in 1923

Herbert Ruckes (1 February 1895 – 23 December 1965) was an American professor of biology and an entomologist at the American Museum of Natural History. He specialized in the Pentatomidae. His son Herbert Ruckes jr. also became an entomologist and specialized in the beetles found on conifer cones including the Anobiinae.

Ruckes was born in New York city where he went to school before going to Cornell University where he received his BS and MA (1917) and a PhD from Columbia University in 1929. He worked on chelonian osteology (the bones of turtles and tortoises) and received the A. Cressy Morrisson prize for natural sciences from the New York Academy of Sciences in 1928. He taught biology at Grove City College, Pennsylvania between 1917 and 1919. In 1920 he joined City College of the City University of New York and worked there until 1954. He was then made emeritus professor at the Baruch School of Business and Public Administration. He worked on comparative anatomy and made use of a variety of techniques including the use of X-rays to study blood vessels. He illustrated a textbook of general biology written by Morris Winokur in 1957. He then worked as a research associate in the department of entomology at the American Museum of Natural History, a NRF fellow from 1959 to 1961 during which time he worked extensively on the Pentatomidae. He collected in the Rocky mountains and Central America. He was a member of the New York Entomological Society.
