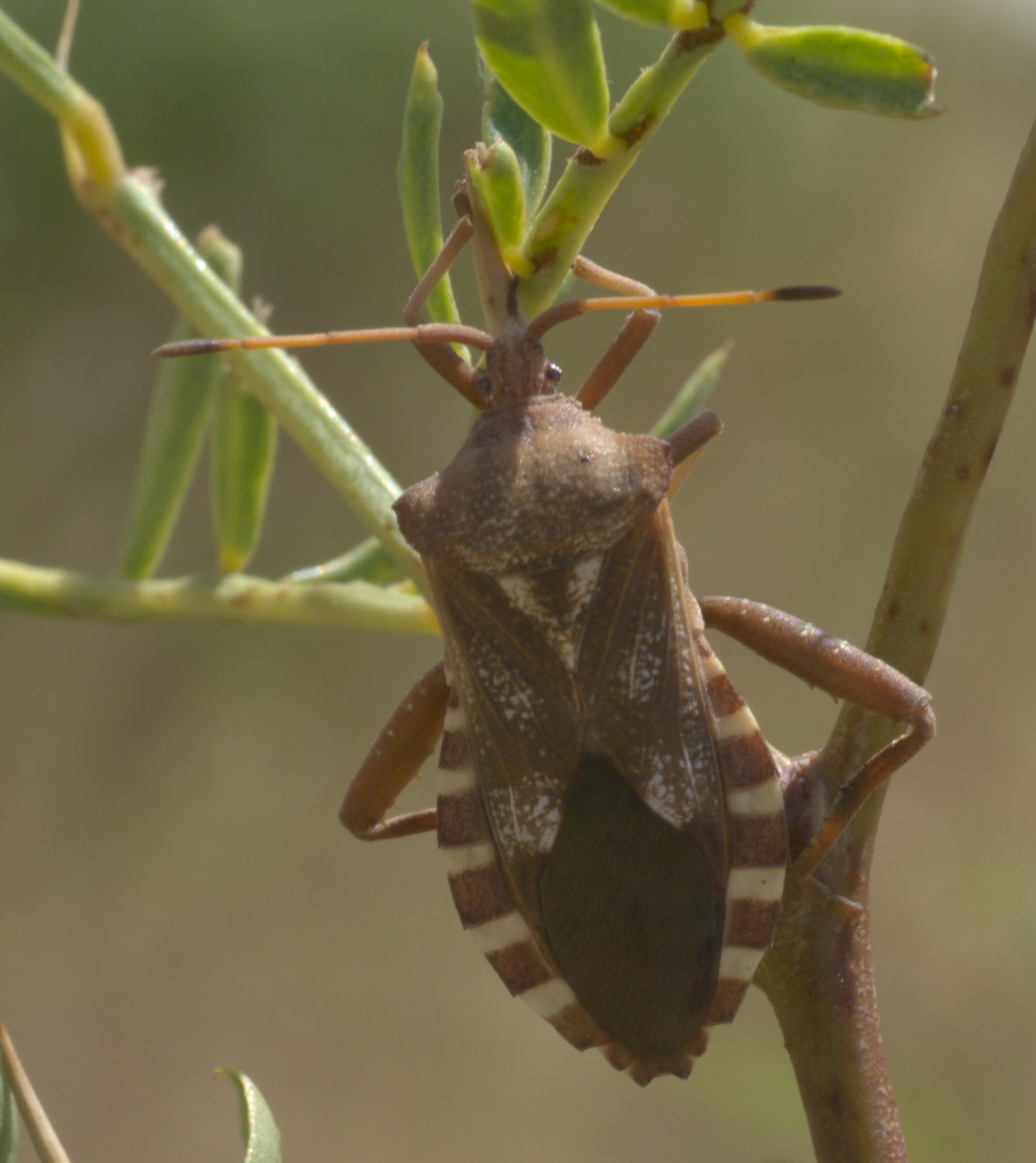

Scientific classification
- Domain: Eukaryota
- Kingdom: Animalia
- Phylum: Arthropoda
- Class: Insecta
- Order: Hemiptera
- Suborder: Heteroptera
- Family: Coreidae
- Subfamily: Coreinae
- Genus: Mozena; Amyot & Serville, 1843

Synonyms
- Mozena (Rhombogaster) Dallas, 1852

= Mozena =

Genus of true bugs

Mozena is a genus of leaf-footed bugs in the family Coreidae. There are more than 30 described species in Mozena.

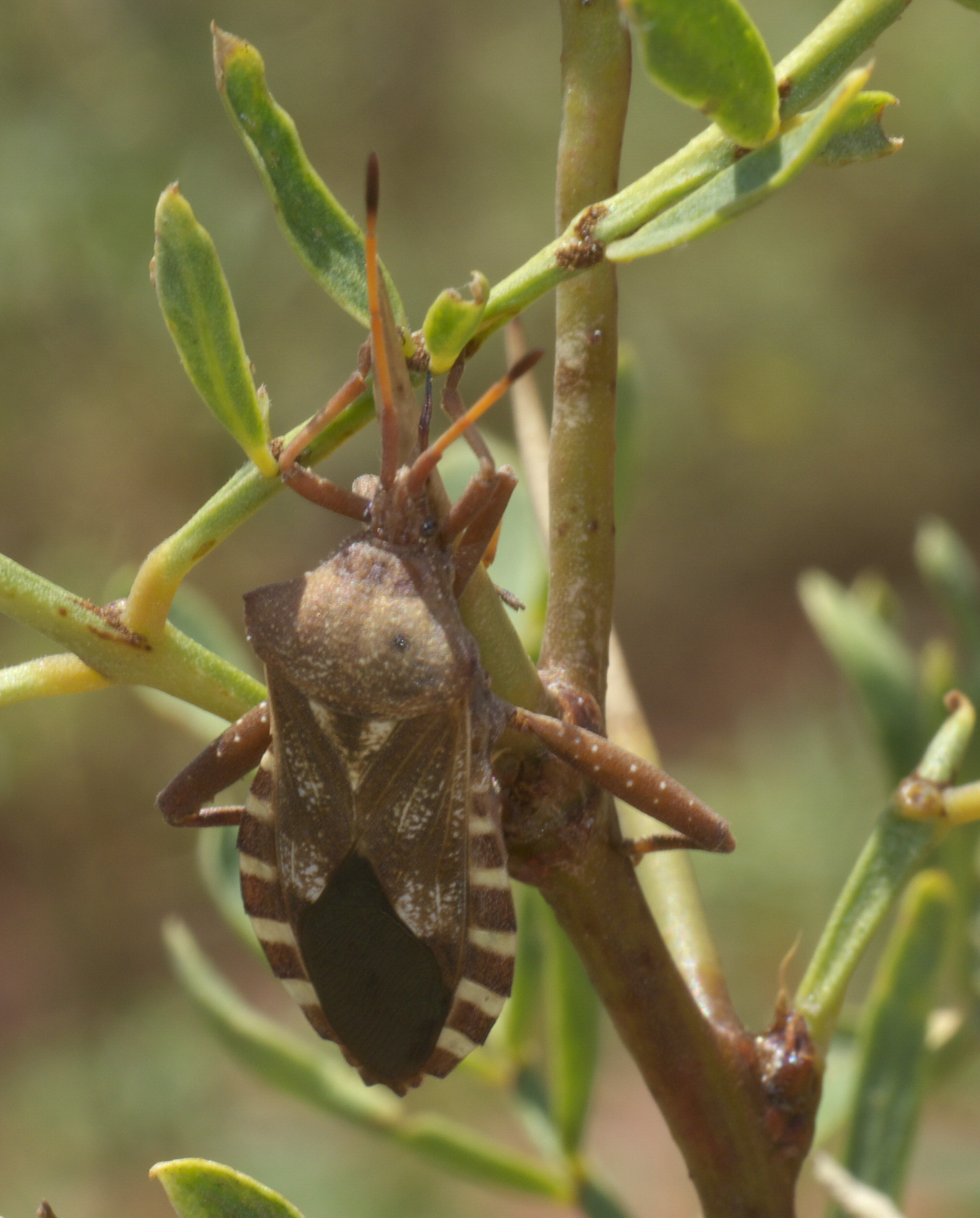

== Species ==
These 31 species belong to the genus Mozena:

- Mozena acantha (Dallas, 1852)
- Mozena affinis (Dallas, 1852)
- Mozena alata Distant, 1900
- Mozena arizonensis Ruckes, 1955
- Mozena atra Brailovsky & Barrera, 2001
- Mozena auricularia Brailovsky, 1999
- Mozena brunnicornis (Herrich-Schäffer, 1840)
- Mozena buenoi Hussey, 1958
- Mozena gaumeri Distant, 1890
- Mozena guanacastela Brailovsky, 1999
- Mozena hector Van Duzee, 1923
- Mozena jansoni (Scott, 1882)
- Mozena lineolata (Herrich-Schäffer, 1840)
- Mozena lunata (Burmeister, 1835)
- Mozena lurida (Dallas, 1852)
- Mozena lutea (Herrich-Schäffer, 1840)
- Mozena nestor (Stål, 1862)
- Mozena nigricornis Stål, 1870
- Mozena nogueirana Brailovsky & Barrera, 2001
- Mozena obesa Montandon, 1899
- Mozena obtusa Uhler, 1876
- Mozena pallisteri Ruckes, 1955
- Mozena pardalota Brailovsky & Barrera, 2001
- Mozena perezae Brailovsky & Barrera, 2001
- Mozena preclara Brailovsky & Barrera, 2001
- Mozena presigna Brailovsky & Barrera, 2001
- Mozena rufula Van Duzee, 1923
- Mozena scrupulosa (Stål, 1862)
- Mozena tomentosa Ruckes, 1955
- Mozena tyttha Brailovsky, 1999
- Mozena ventralis (Mayr, 1865)
