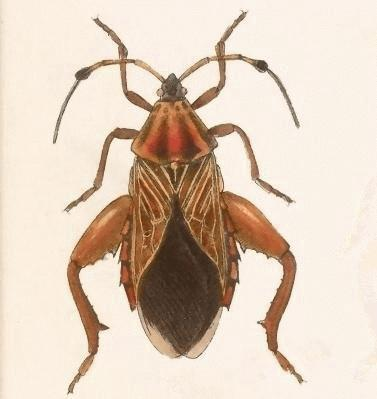
- Pachylis pharaonis

Scientific classification
- Kingdom: Animalia
- Phylum: Arthropoda
- Class: Insecta
- Order: Hemiptera
- Suborder: Heteroptera
- Family: Coreidae
- Subfamily: Coreinae
- Tribe: Nematopodini
- Genus: Pachylis; Le Peletier & Serville, 1825

= Pachylis =

Genus of true bugs

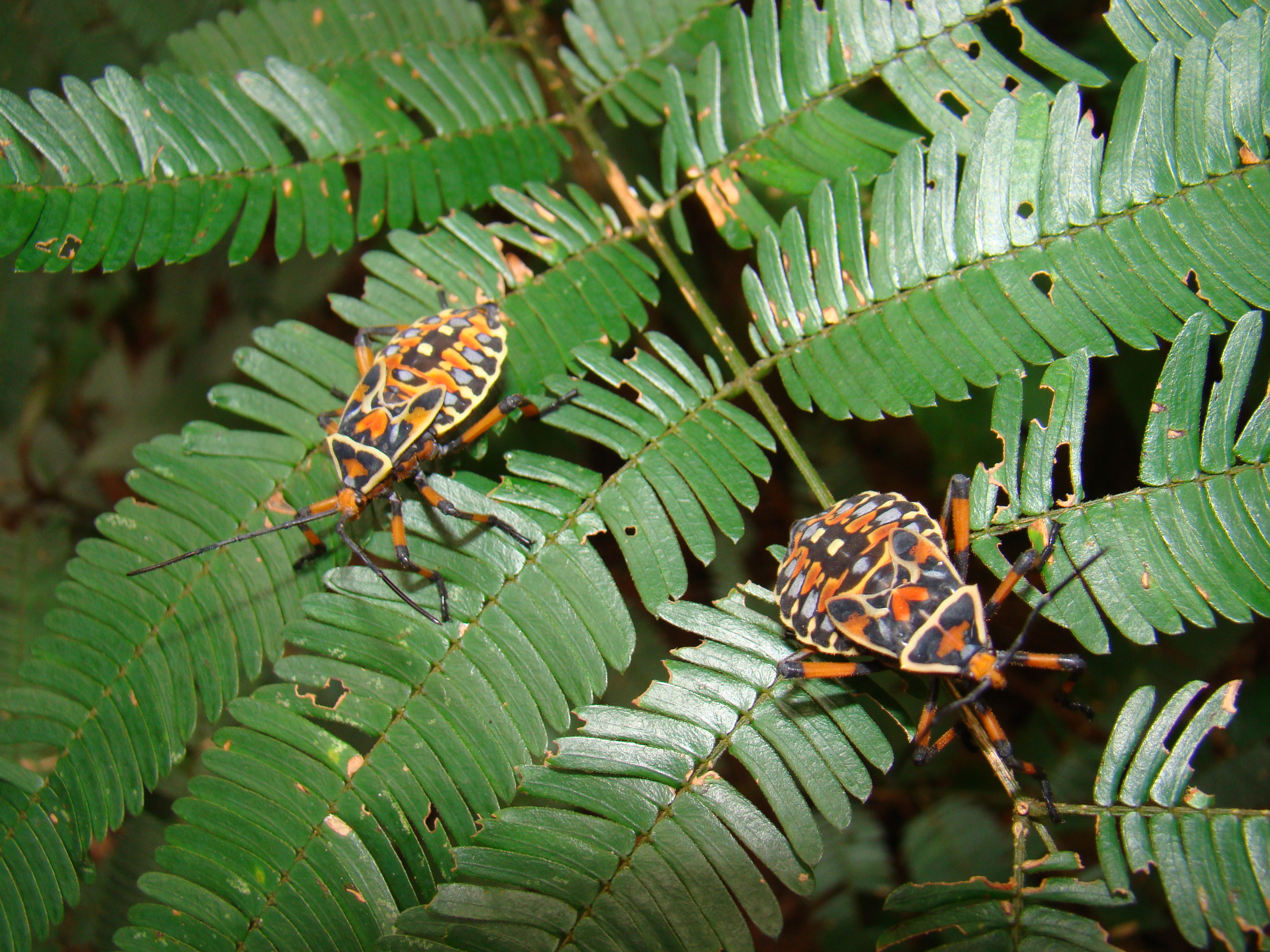
Pachylis nervosus

Pachylis is a genus of leaf-footed bugs in the family Coreidae. There are about 10 described species in Pachylis.

== Species ==
- Pachylis argentinus Berg, 1879
- Pachylis bipunctatus (Thunberg, 1825)
- Pachylis furvus Brailovsky & Guerrero, 2014
- Pachylis laticornis (Fabricius, 1798)
- Pachylis nervosus Dallas, 1852
- Pachylis obscurus Spinola, 1837
- Pachylis peramplus Brailovsky & Guerrero, 2014
- Pachylis pharaonis (Herbst, 1784)
- Pachylis striatus (Thunberg, 1825)
- Pachylis tenuicornis Dallas, 1852
