= Harry Brailovsky Alperowits =

Mexican biologist (born 1946)

Harry Urad Brailovsky Alperowitz (born in Mexico City on May 30, 1946) is a biologist. He earned his BA, MA and Ph.D. in biological sciences at the Faculty of Sciences, National Autonomous University of Mexico. His main academic interest is the taxonomy, biology, and biogeography of Coreidae, especially those found in Mexico (Hemiptera: Heteroptera). As an entomological authority he is cited as Brailovsky.

Brailovsky has published over 200 academic works on Coreoidea describing over 660 new species.
