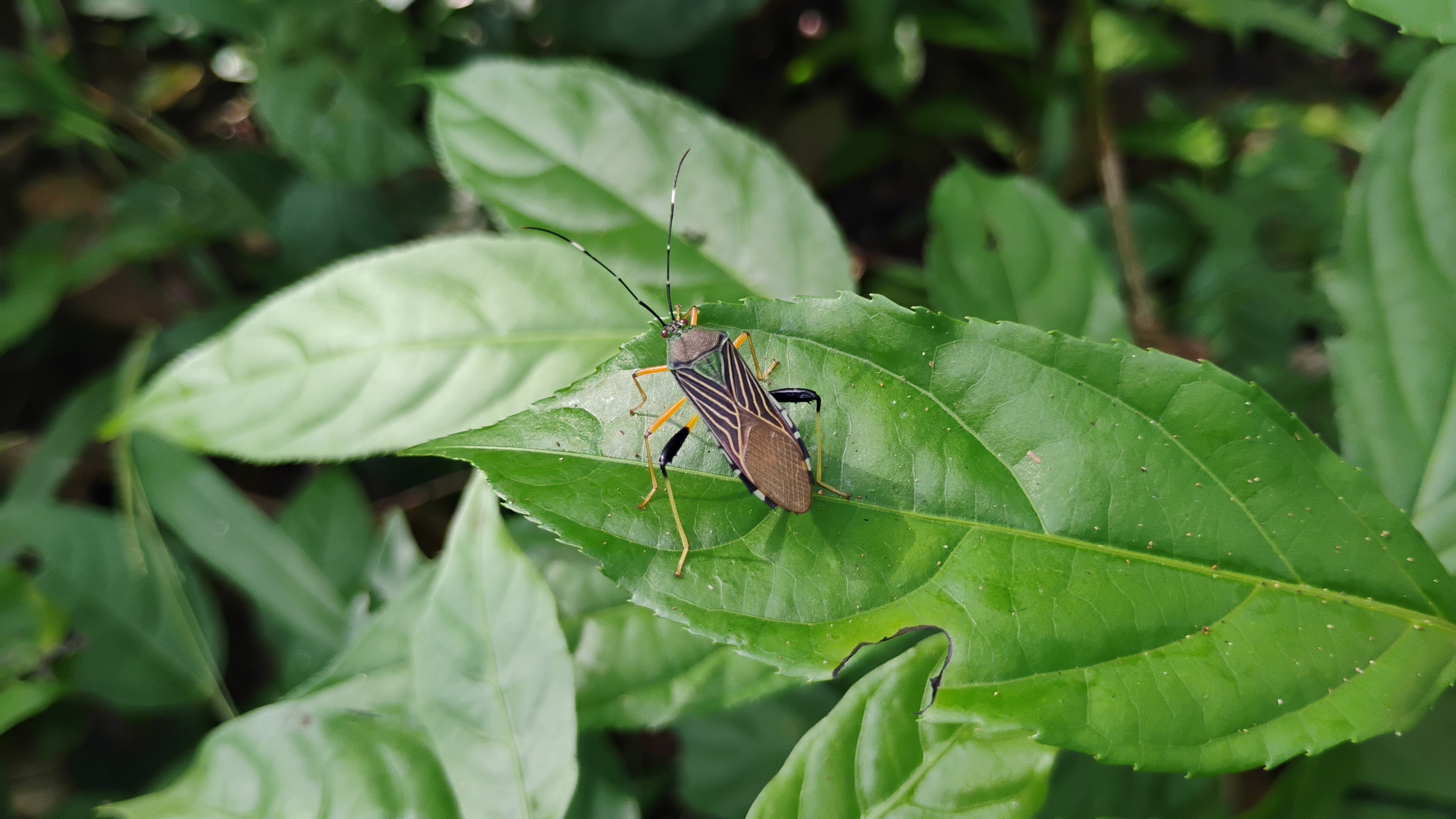
- Nematopus sp.

Scientific classification
- Kingdom: Animalia
- Phylum: Arthropoda
- Class: Insecta
- Order: Hemiptera
- Suborder: Heteroptera
- Family: Coreidae
- Genus: Nematopus; Berthold, 1827

= Nematopus (bug) =

Genus of insects

Nematopus is a genus of true bugs belonging to the family Coreidae.

The species of this genus are found in Central and Southern America.

Species:

- Nematopus aeneicrus Stål, 1865
- Nematopus amazonus Stål, 1865
- Nematopus indus
