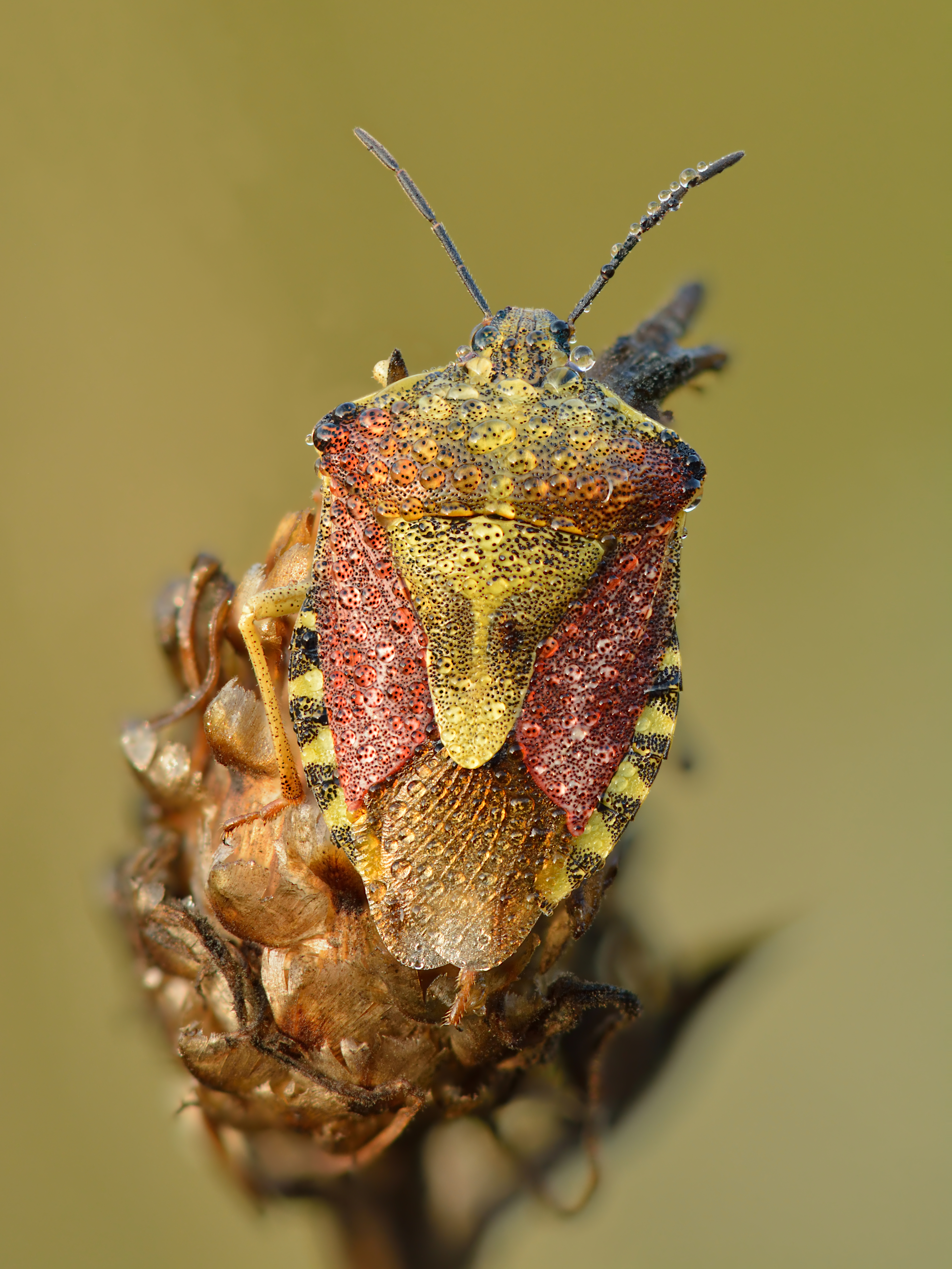
- Adult
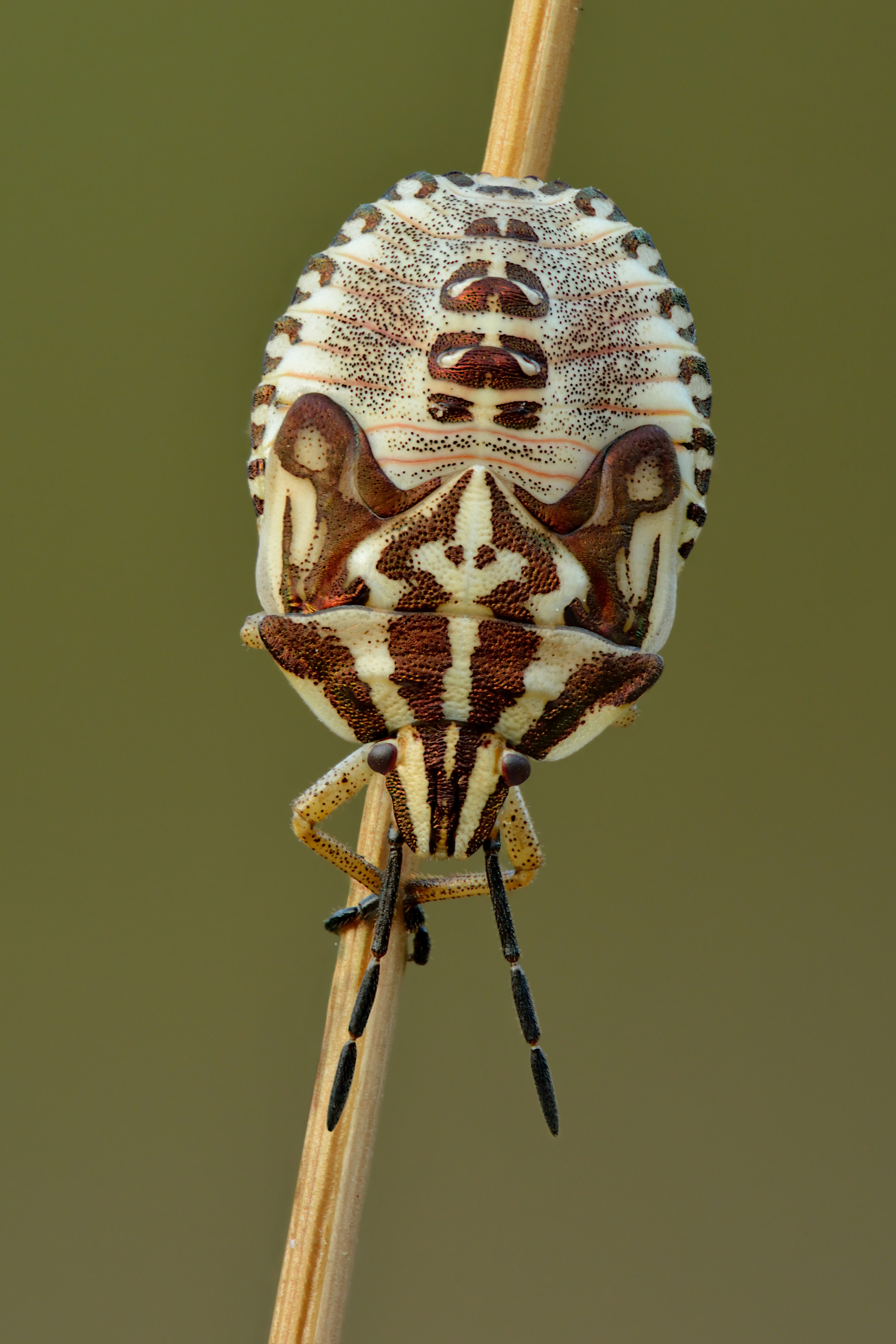
- Fifth instar nymph

Scientific classification
- Domain: Eukaryota
- Kingdom: Animalia
- Phylum: Arthropoda
- Class: Insecta
- Order: Hemiptera
- Suborder: Heteroptera
- Family: Pentatomidae
- Genus: Carpocoris
- Species: C. purpureipennis

Binomial name
- Carpocoris purpureipennis (De Geer, 1773)

= Carpocoris purpureipennis =

Species of true bug

Carpocoris purpureipennis is a species of shield bug of the family Pentatomidae, subfamily Pentatominae.

== Distribution and habitat ==
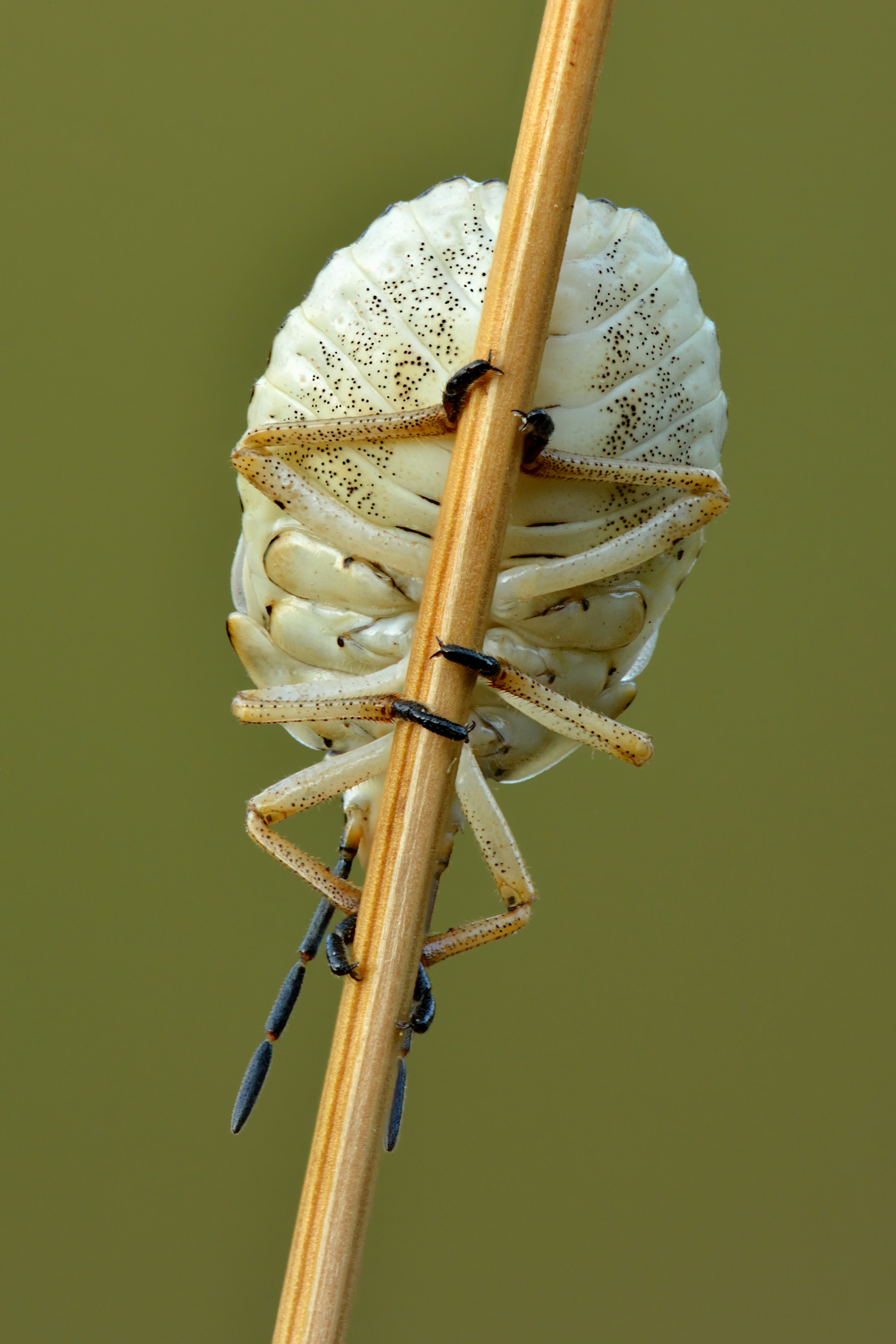
Ventral view of fifth instar nymph

This species can be found in most of Europe and in central Asia. They live in meadows, roadsides, edges of forests and gardens.

== Description ==
Carpocoris purpureipennis can reach a length of 11–13 millimetres (0.43–0.51 in). The pronotum is wide with a regular punctuation, almost straight and slightly pointed lateral margins with blunt tips. Also the lateral edges of the scutellum are nearly straight.

The body color varies from purple or reddish-brown to yellowish. The pronotum angles are black. Moreover pronotum usually shows short longitudinal black stripes, while the scutellum may have some contrasting black spots. Antennae are black and legs are orange.

This species is quite similar to, and can be easily confused with Carpocoris pudicus, C. fuscispinus, and C. mediterraneus.

== Ecology ==
Both the adult bugs and their nymphs are polyphagous. Adults mainly feed on juices of Cirsium arvense and nectar of Leucanthemum vulgare.

In late May-early June these insects lay eggs on various herbaceous plants of the family of cereals (Poaceae), legumes (Fabaceae), crucifers (Brassicaceae) and composites (Asteraceae).

These bugs are considered an agricultural pest. They can damage soybean, beans, cabbage, carrots, raspberries, strawberries, potatoes, radish, wheat and apple trees.

== Subspecies ==
Two subspecies are recognised:

- Carpocoris purpureipennis purpureipennis (De Geer, 1773)
- Carpocoris purpureipennis sexmaculatus Péneau, 1921

== Bibliography ==
- Rider D.A., 2004 – Family Pentatomidae – Catalogue of the Heteroptera of the Palaearctic Region
