= Carpocoris mediterraneus =

- C. m. mediterraneus, Turkey

Scientific classification
- Kingdom: Animalia
- Phylum: Arthropoda
- Clade: Pancrustacea
- Class: Insecta
- Order: Hemiptera
- Suborder: Heteroptera
- Family: Pentatomidae
- Genus: Carpocoris
- Species: C. mediterraneus

Binomial name
- Carpocoris mediterraneus Tamanini, 1958

Species of true bug

Carpocoris mediterraneus, the red shield bug, is a species of shield bug in the family Pentatomidae.

== Subspecies ==
- Carpocoris mediterraneus atlanticus Tamanini, 1958
- Carpocoris mediterraneus mediterraneus Tamanini, 1958

== Distribution ==
This species is widespread throughout the Mediterranean region (Corsica, Greece, Italy, Morocco, Sardinia, Sicily).

== Description ==
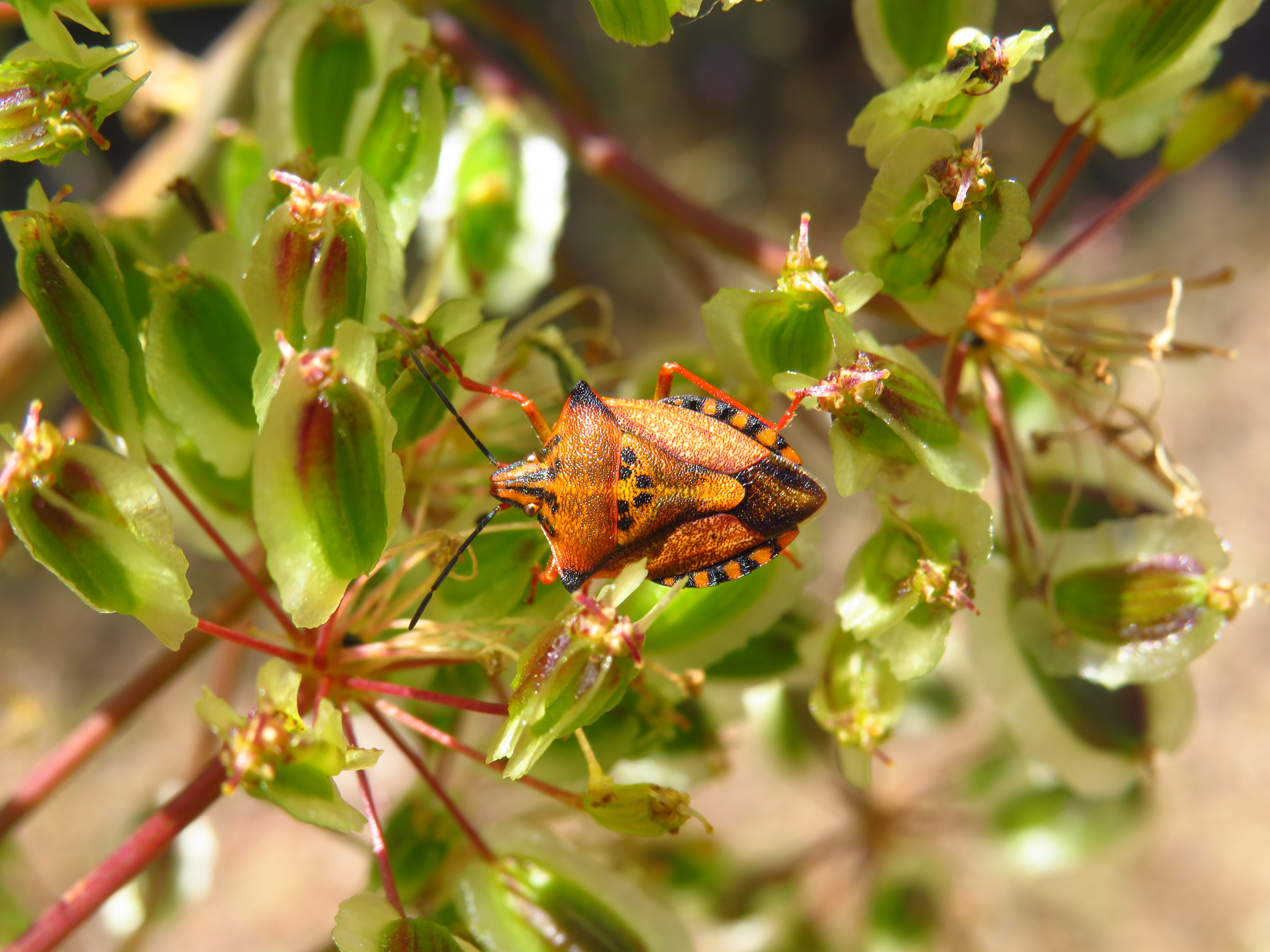
Carpocoris mediterraneus ssp. atlanticus in Spain.

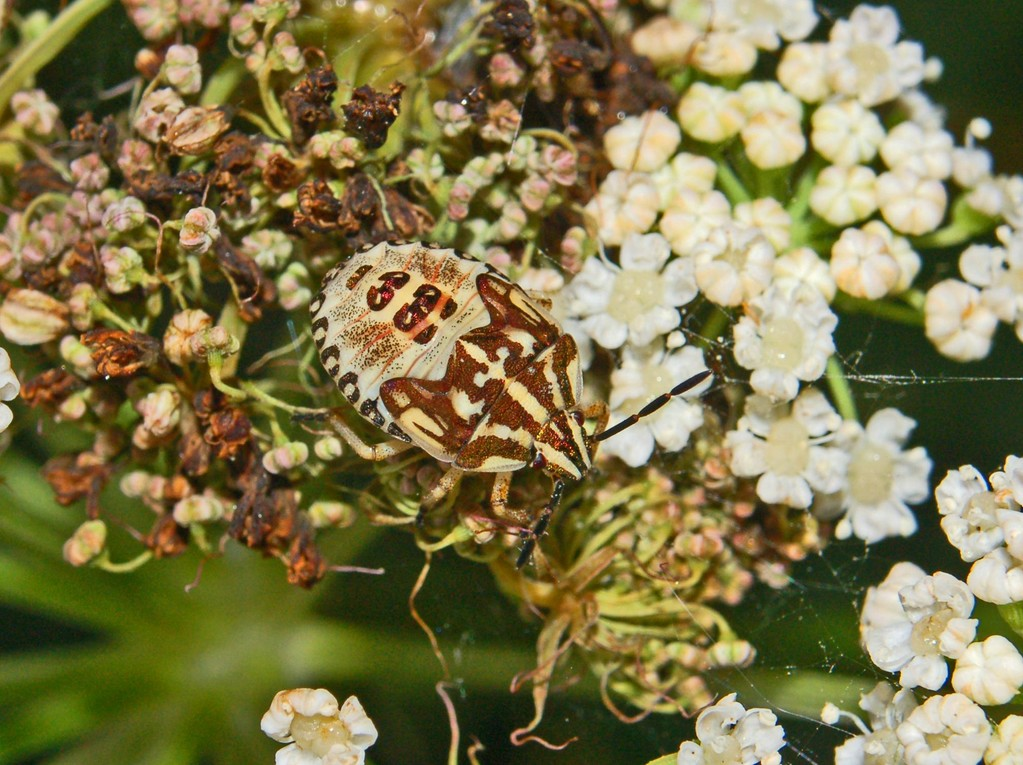
Carpocoris mediterraneus - Nymph

Carpocoris mediterraneus can reach a length of 11–13 millimetres (0.43–0.51 in). The body is shield-like in shape and the elytrae are very thick. The body surface is bright yellow or orange, with four short longitudinal black stripes on the pronotum and five dark spots on the scutellum. The antennae have 5 segments. Legs are yellowish or orange.

This species is similar and can be confused with Carpocoris pudicus, Carpocoris purpureipennis or Carpocoris fuscispinus.

In Carpocoris mediterraneus atlanticus the humeral angles of pronotum are sharp and protruding, the base of scutellum and connexivum are frequently with contrasting black spots and the apex of the scutellum is exceptionally truncated.

== Biology ==
These bugs are polyphagous vegetarian. Adults can be found on several flowering plants, especially on parsley (Petroselinum crispum).

== Bibliography ==
- L. Tamanini, Due nuovi Carpocoris della sottoregione mediterranea (Heteroptera, Pentatomidae), Annali del Museo Civico di Storia Naturale di Genova 70:165-172. (1958)
