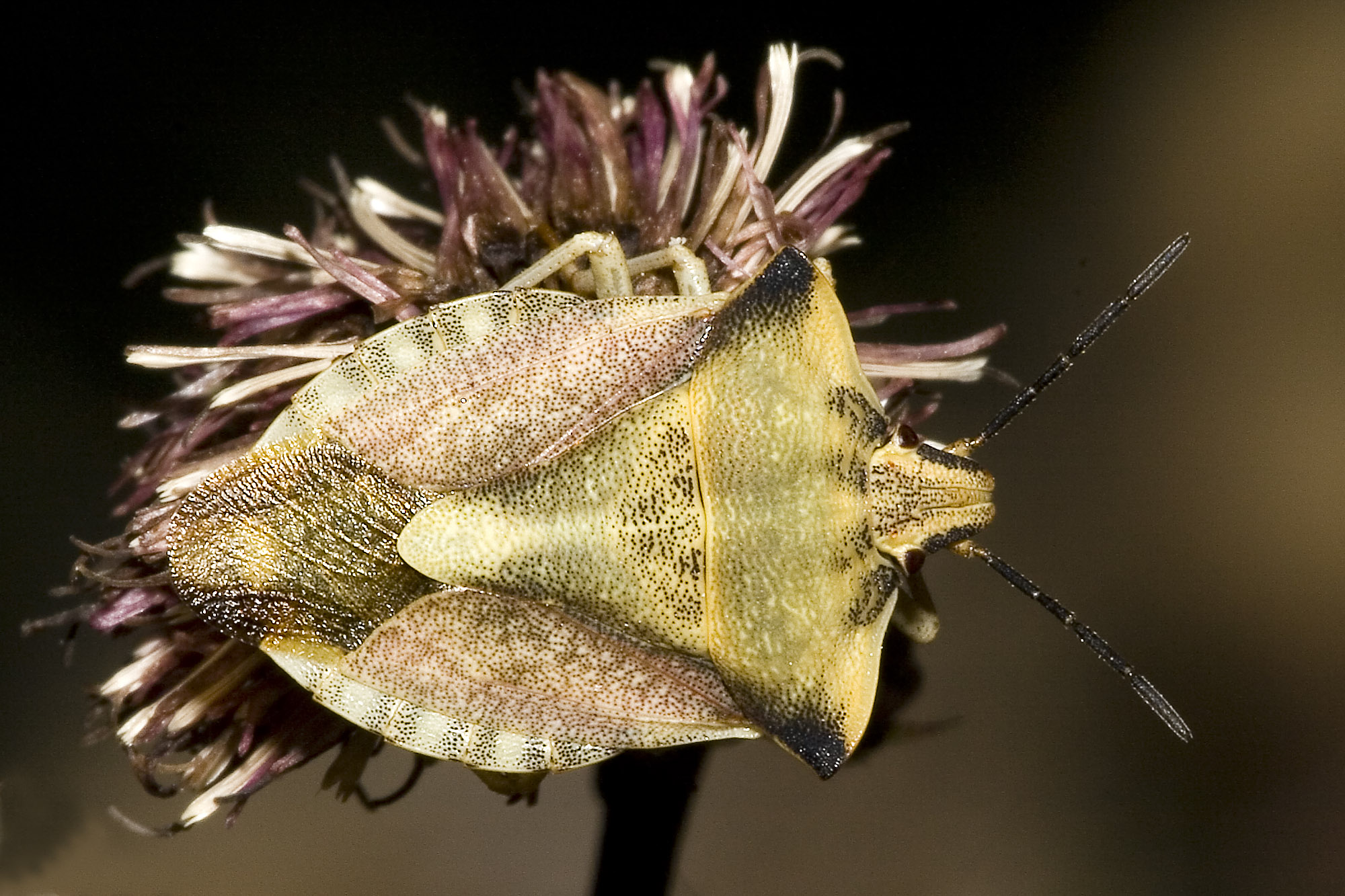
- Adult of Carpocoris fuscispinus

Scientific classification
- Kingdom: Animalia
- Phylum: Arthropoda
- Clade: Pancrustacea
- Class: Insecta
- Order: Hemiptera
- Suborder: Heteroptera
- Family: Pentatomidae
- Subfamily: Pentatominae
- Tribe: Carpocorini
- Genus: Carpocoris; Kolenati, 1846

= Carpocoris =

Genus of true bugs

Carpocoris is a genus of mostly Palearctic shield bugs in the family Pentatomidae and typical of the tribe Carpocorini. The species of this genus are quite similar.

== Distribution ==
The species of this genus are widespread in most of Europe.

== Species ==
- Carpocoris absinthii (Wagner, 1952)
- Carpocoris coreanus (Distant, 1899)
  - Carpocoris coreanus coreanus (Distant, 1899)
  - Carpocoris coreanus iranus (Tamanini, 1958)
- Carpocoris eryngii (Hahn)
- Carpocoris fuscispinus (Boheman, 1851)
  - Carpocoris fuscispinus hahni (Flor, 1856)
  - Carpocoris fuscispinus incerta (Tamanini, 1959)
  - Carpocoris fuscispinus maculosa (Tamanini, 1959)
  - Carpocoris fuscispinus mediterranea (Tamanini, 1959)
- Carpocoris iranus (Tamanini, 1958)
- Carpocoris lunulatus (Goeze) – Antheminia lunulata (Goeze, 1778)
- Carpocoris mediterraneus (Tamanini, 1959)
  - Carpocoris mediterraneus atlanticus (Tamanini, 1958)
  - Carpocoris mediterraneus maculifera (Tamanini, 1958)
  - Carpocoris mediterraneus mediterraneus (Tamanini, 1959)
- Carpocoris melanocerus (Mulsant & Rey, 1852)
- Carpocoris penicillatus
- Carpocoris pudicus (Poda, 1761)
- Carpocoris purpureipennis (De Geer, 1773)
  - Carpocoris purpureipennis japonensis (Tamanini, 1959)
- Carpocoris seidenstückeri (Tamanini, 1959)

== Gallery ==
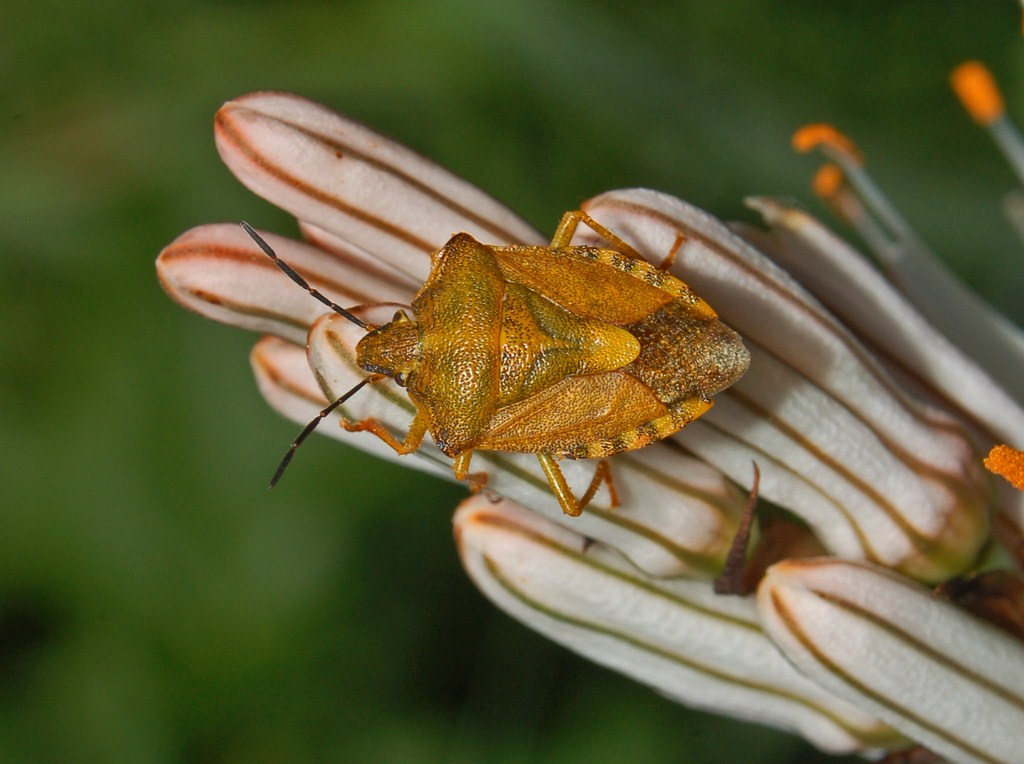
Carpocoris purpureipennis

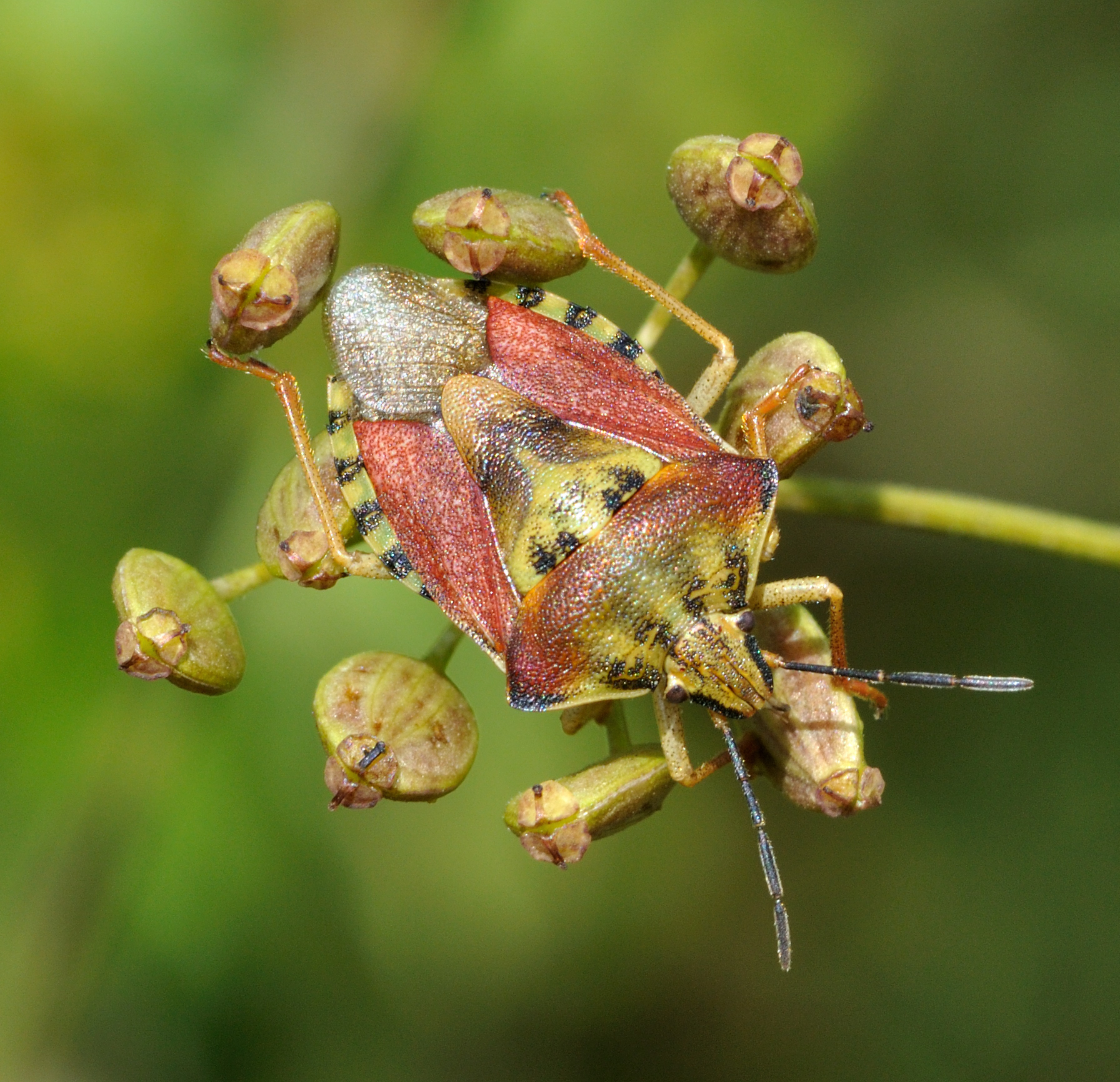
Carpocoris purpureipennis

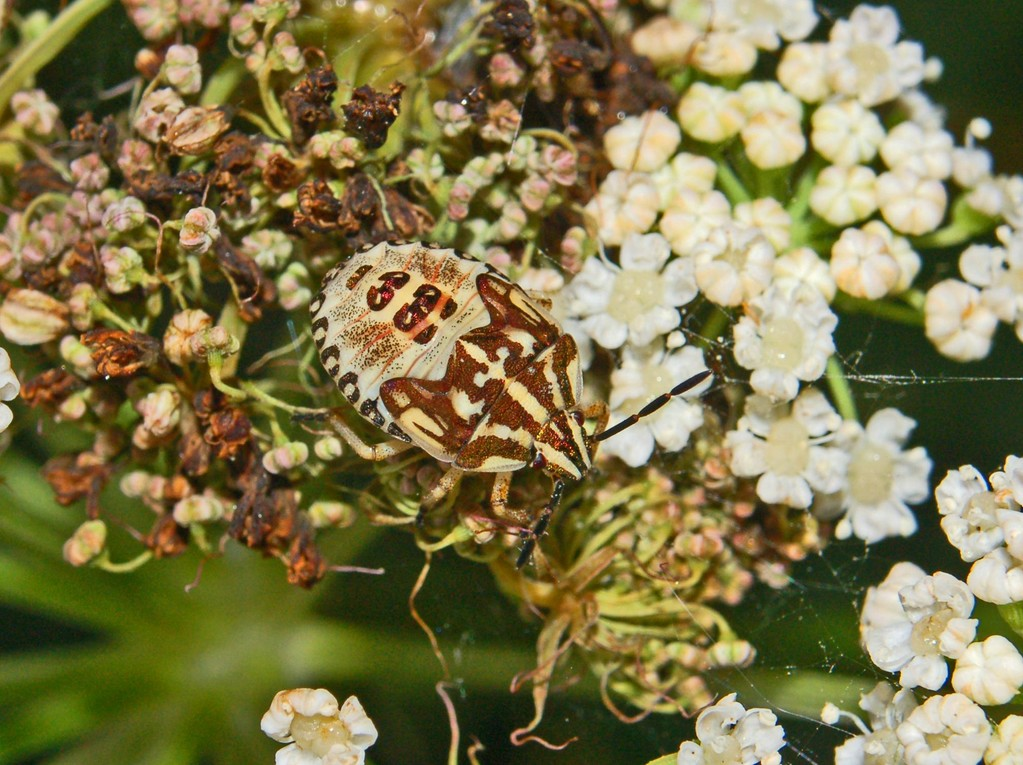
Carpocoris mediterraneus, nymph

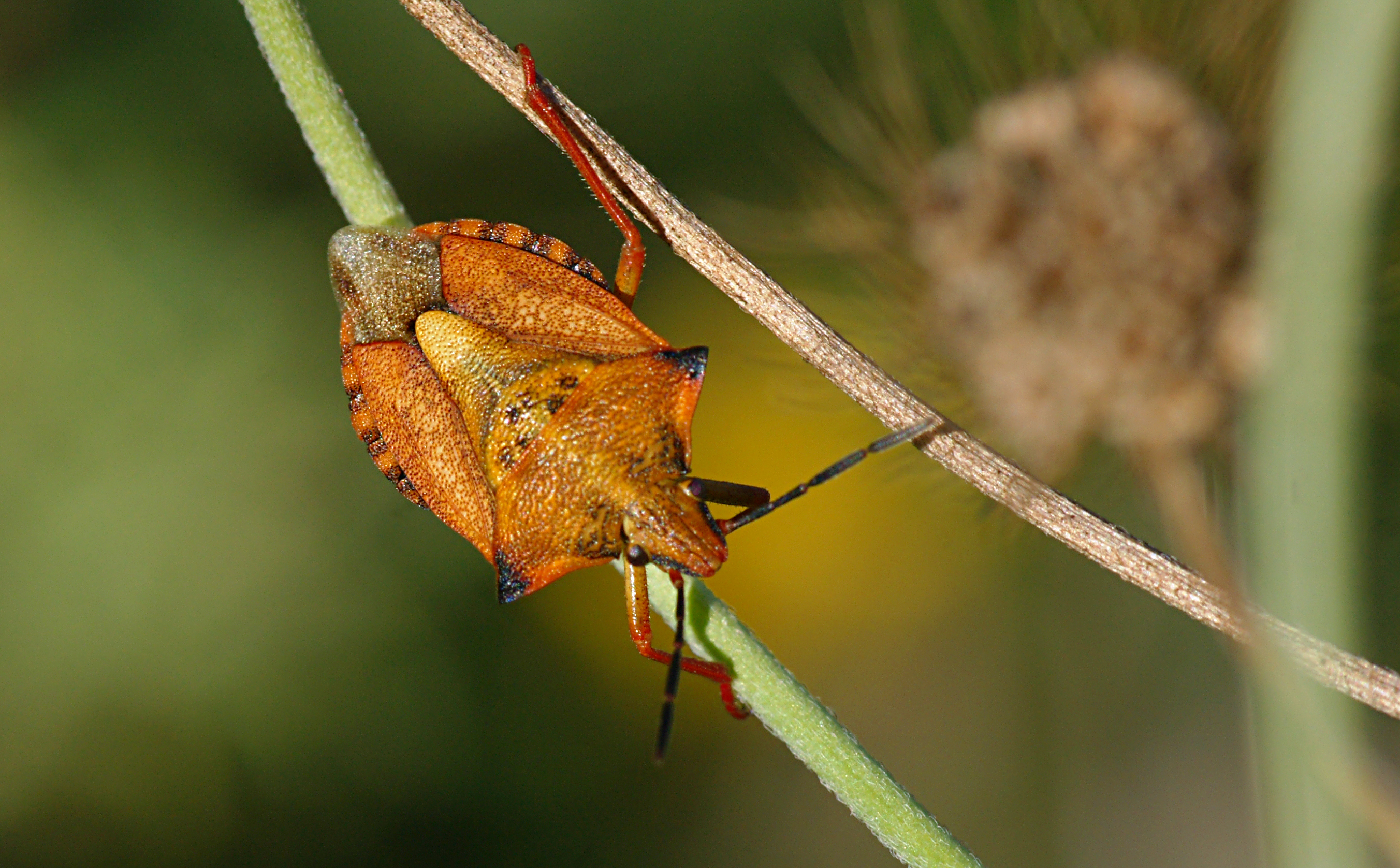
Carpocoris mediterraneus

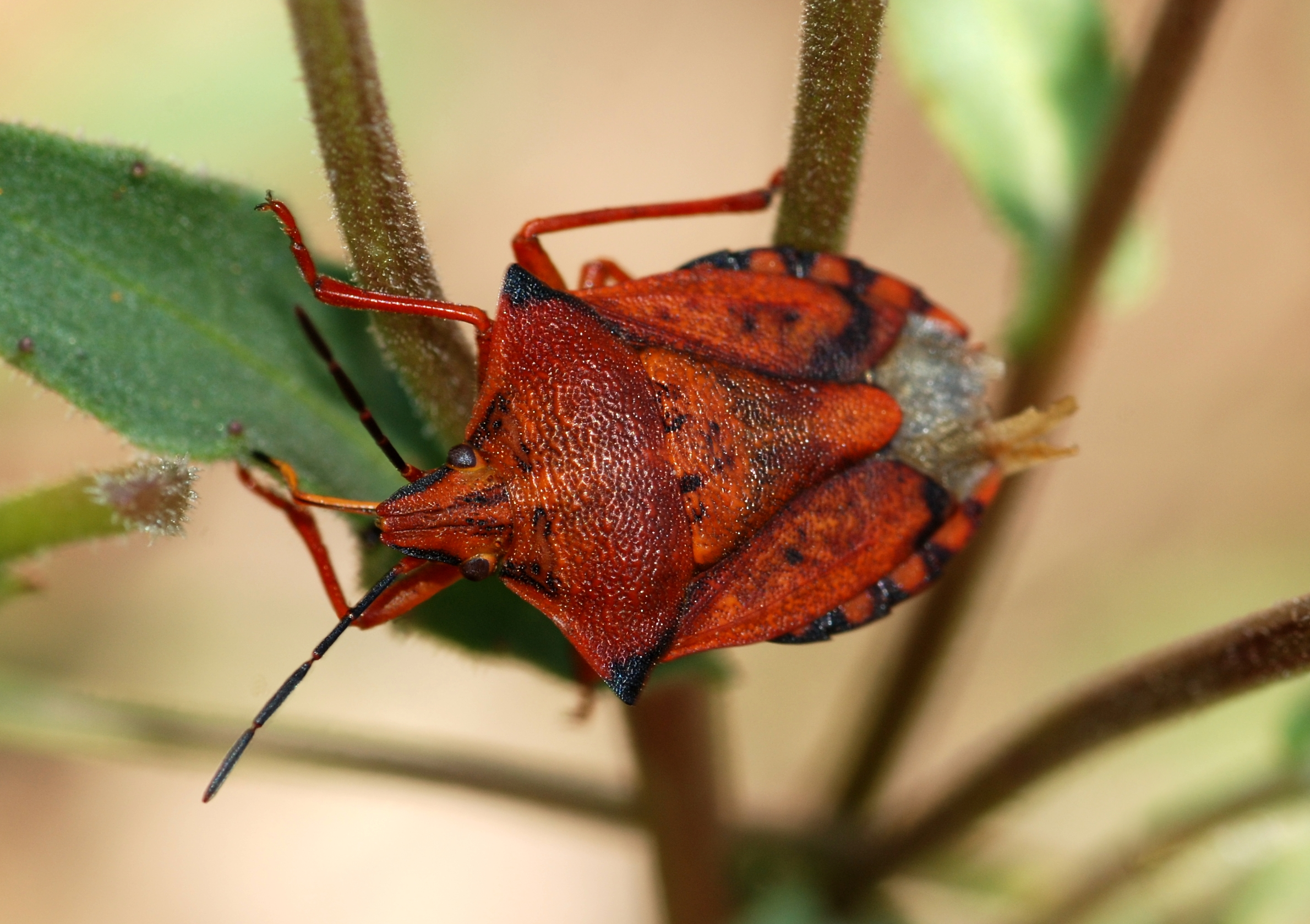
Carpocoris fuscispinus

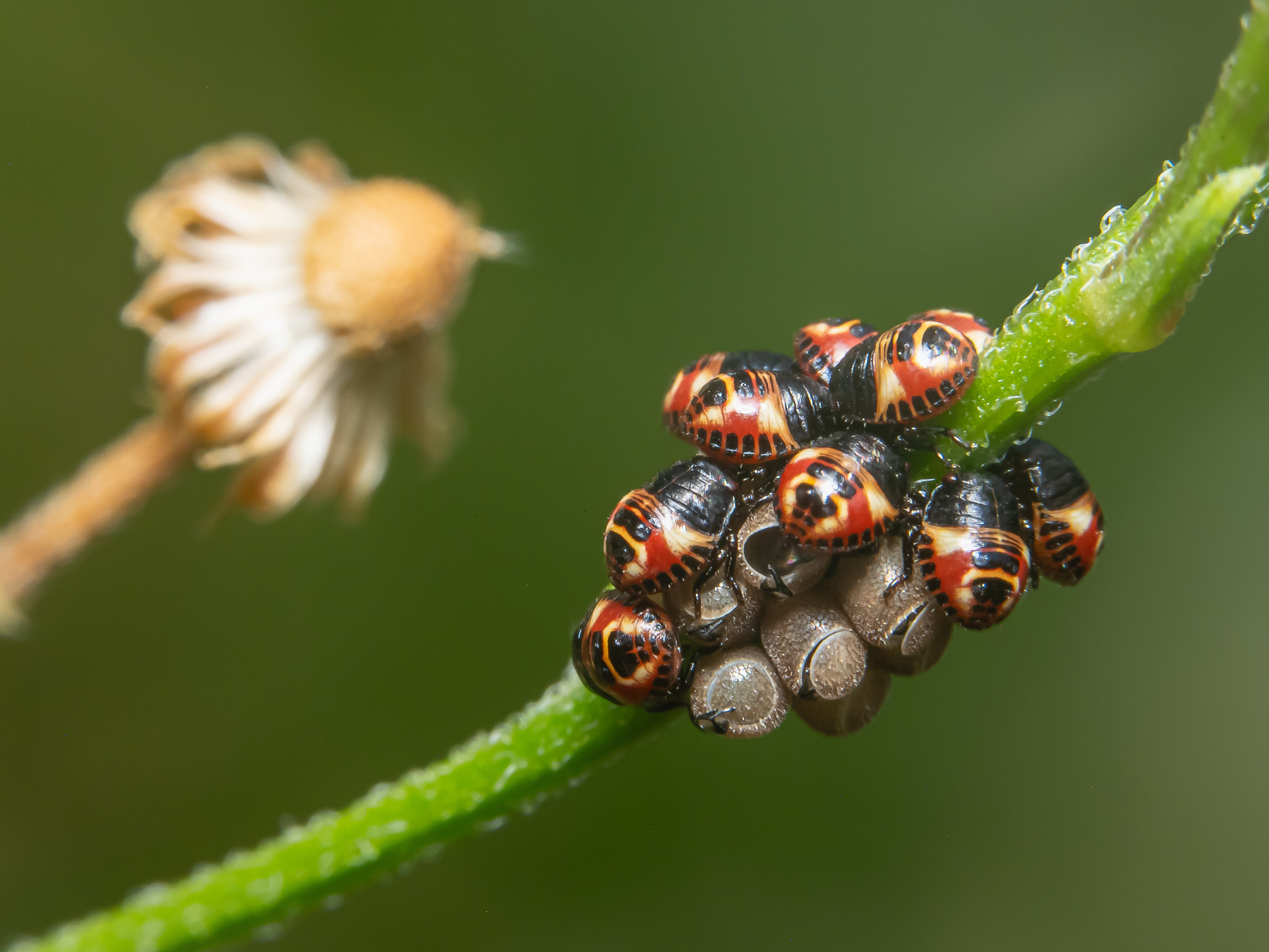
Newly hatched larvae of Carpocoris sp.

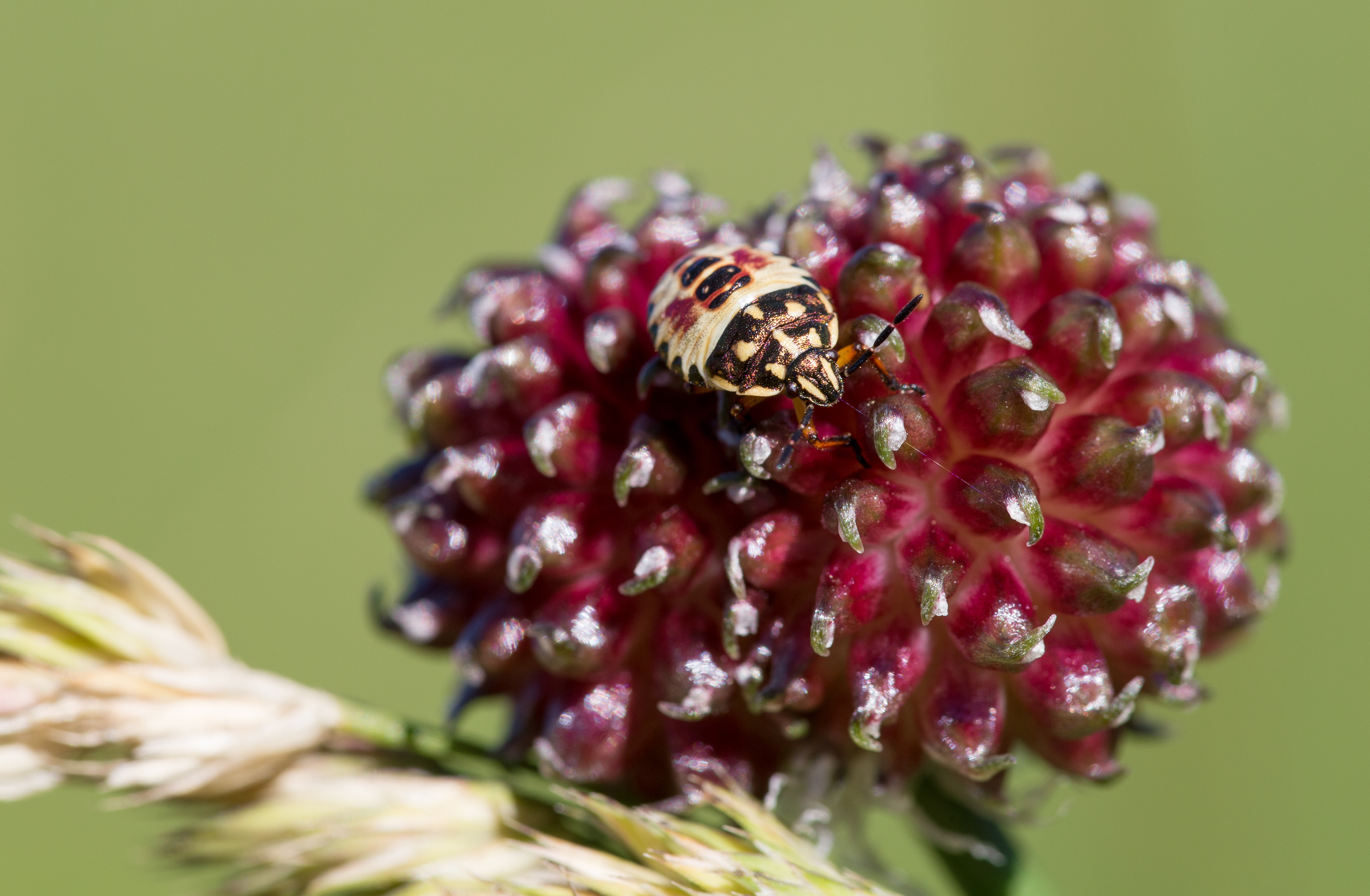
Juvenile Bug (Carpocoris sp.) on a Wild Garlic's head (Allium vineale)
