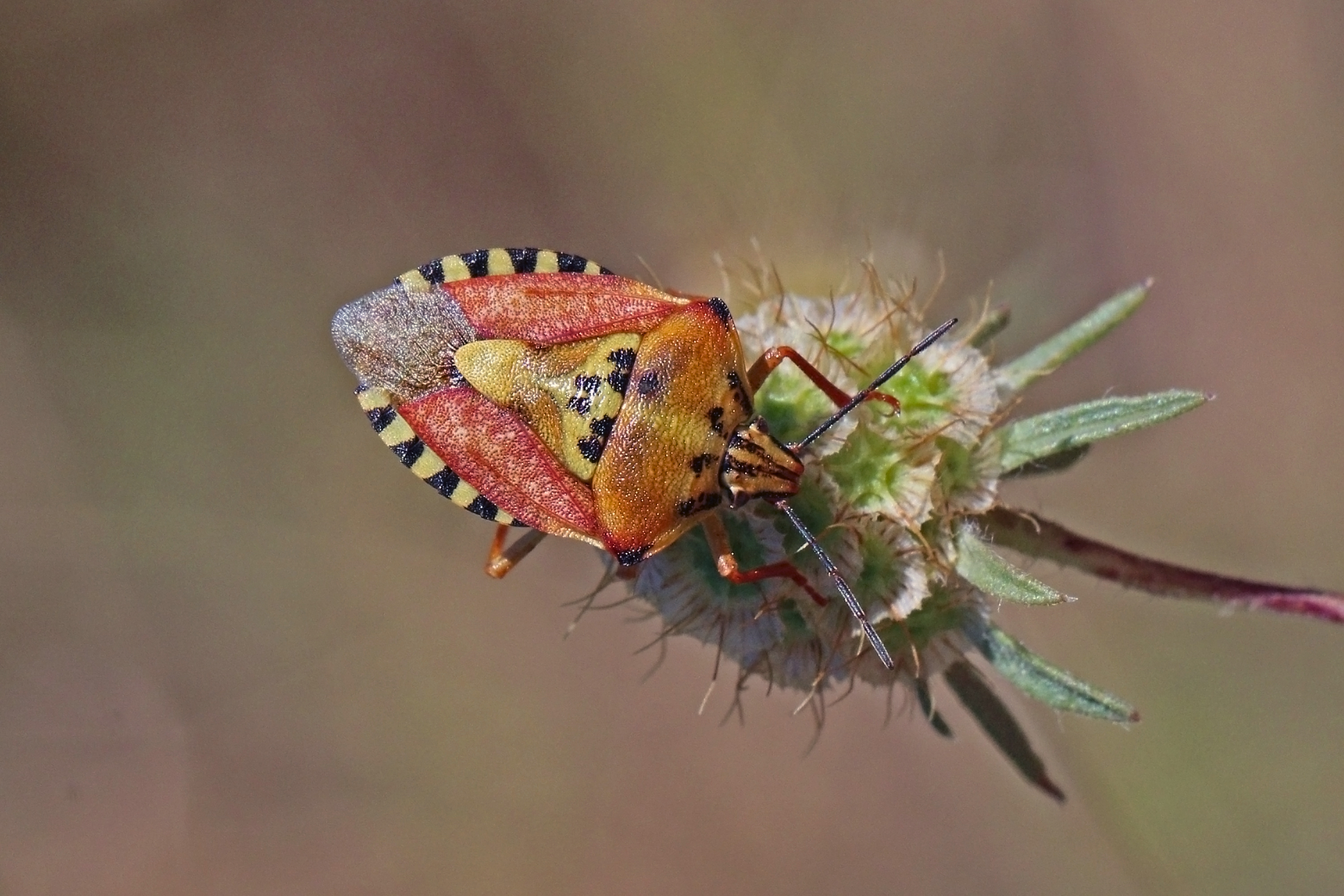
- Adult of Carpocoris pudicus

Scientific classification
- Domain: Eukaryota
- Kingdom: Animalia
- Phylum: Arthropoda
- Class: Insecta
- Order: Hemiptera
- Suborder: Heteroptera
- Family: Pentatomidae
- Genus: Carpocoris
- Species: C. pudicus

Binomial name
- Carpocoris pudicus (Poda, 1761)

Synonyms
- Cimex pudicus Poda, 1761; Carpocoris atroscutellatus Halászfy, 1955; Cimex carneus Gmelin, 1790; Cimex cinctus Schrank, 1776; Cimex incarnatus Goeze, 1778; Carpocoris nigromaculata Tamanini, 1959; Carpocoris obscurata Tamanini, 1959; Pentatoma pallida Dallas, 1851; Pentatoma wilkinsonii Westwood, 1837

= Carpocoris pudicus =

Species of true bug

Carpocoris pudicus is a species of shield bug in the family Pentatomidae.

== Distribution ==
This species is widespread in most of central and southern Europe (Albania, Austria, Bulgaria, Croatia, Czech Republic, France, Germany, Greece, Italy, North Macedonia, Romania, Northwestern Russia, Slovakia, Slovenia, Switzerland, former Yugoslavia.

== Habitat ==
This species inhabits sunny, hot and dry environments.

== Description ==
Carpocoris pudicus can reach a body length of about 11 mm (0.43 in). The head of each paramere has a single tooth. The abdomen is usually narrower or has the same width than pronotum. The humeral angles of pronotum are rounded, with black spot. Scutellum is weakly convex, without depression. Side edges of the scutellum shows a sharp, deep groove in the middle.

This species is very similar to Carpocoris mediterraneus, however it may be distinguished by blunt and non-pointed pronotum angles and by the pronotum and abdomen of the same width.

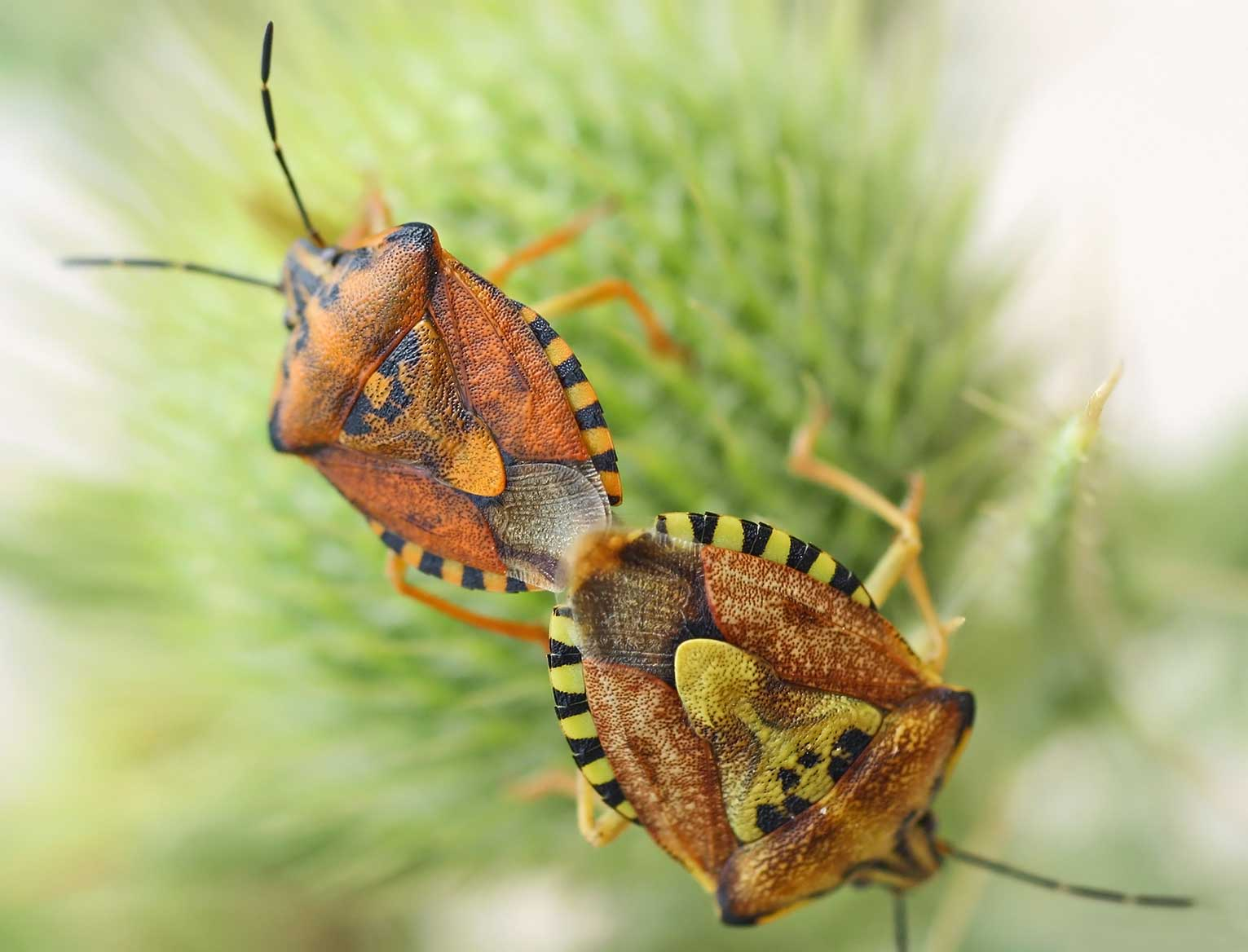
Mating

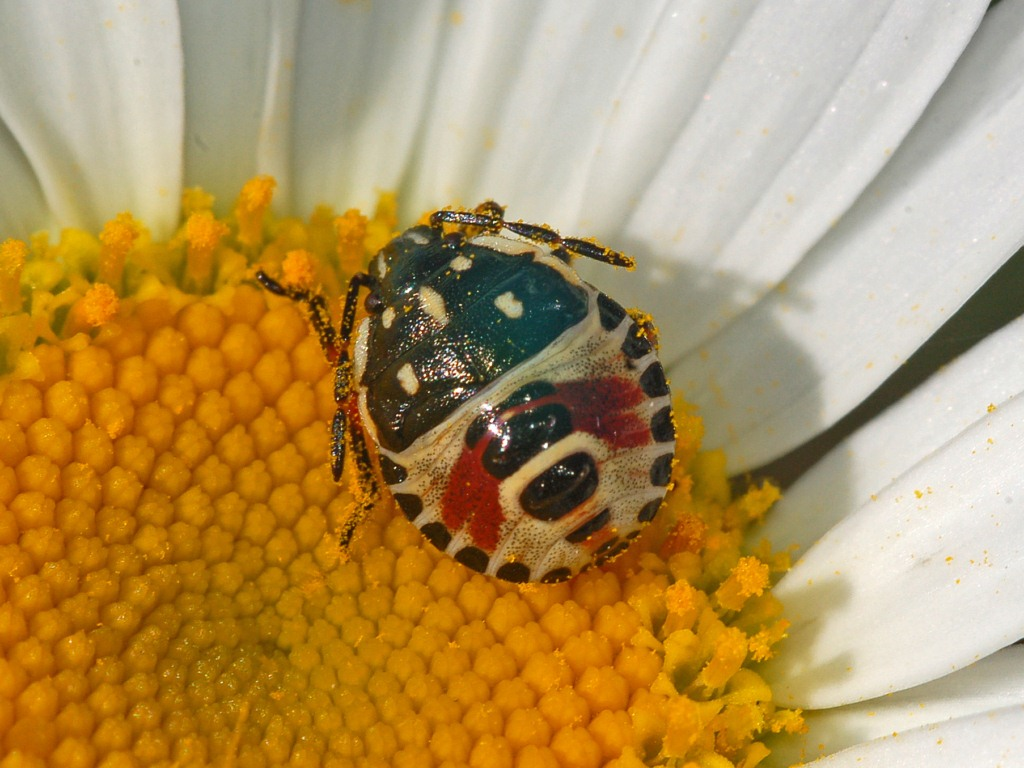
Nymph

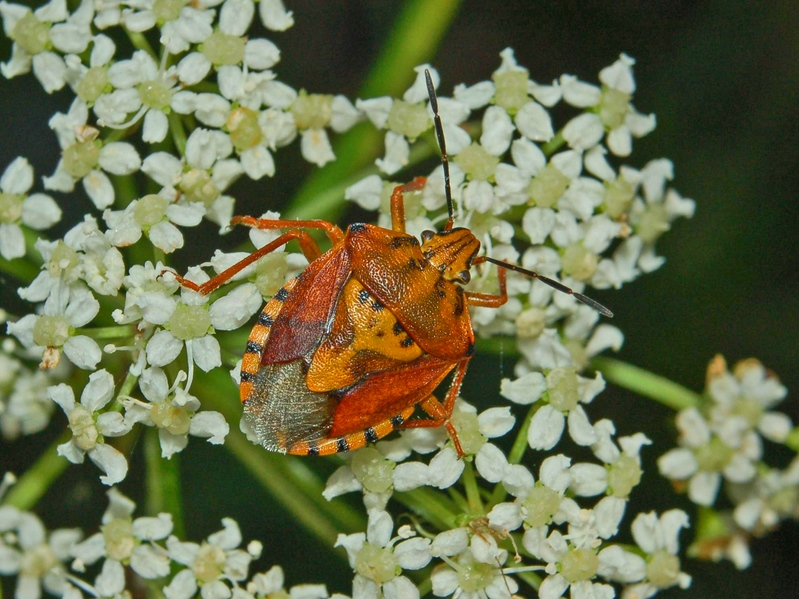
Adult

== Biology ==
These shield bugs are polyphagous, they mainly feed on Apiaceae, Asteraceae and Poaceae species.
