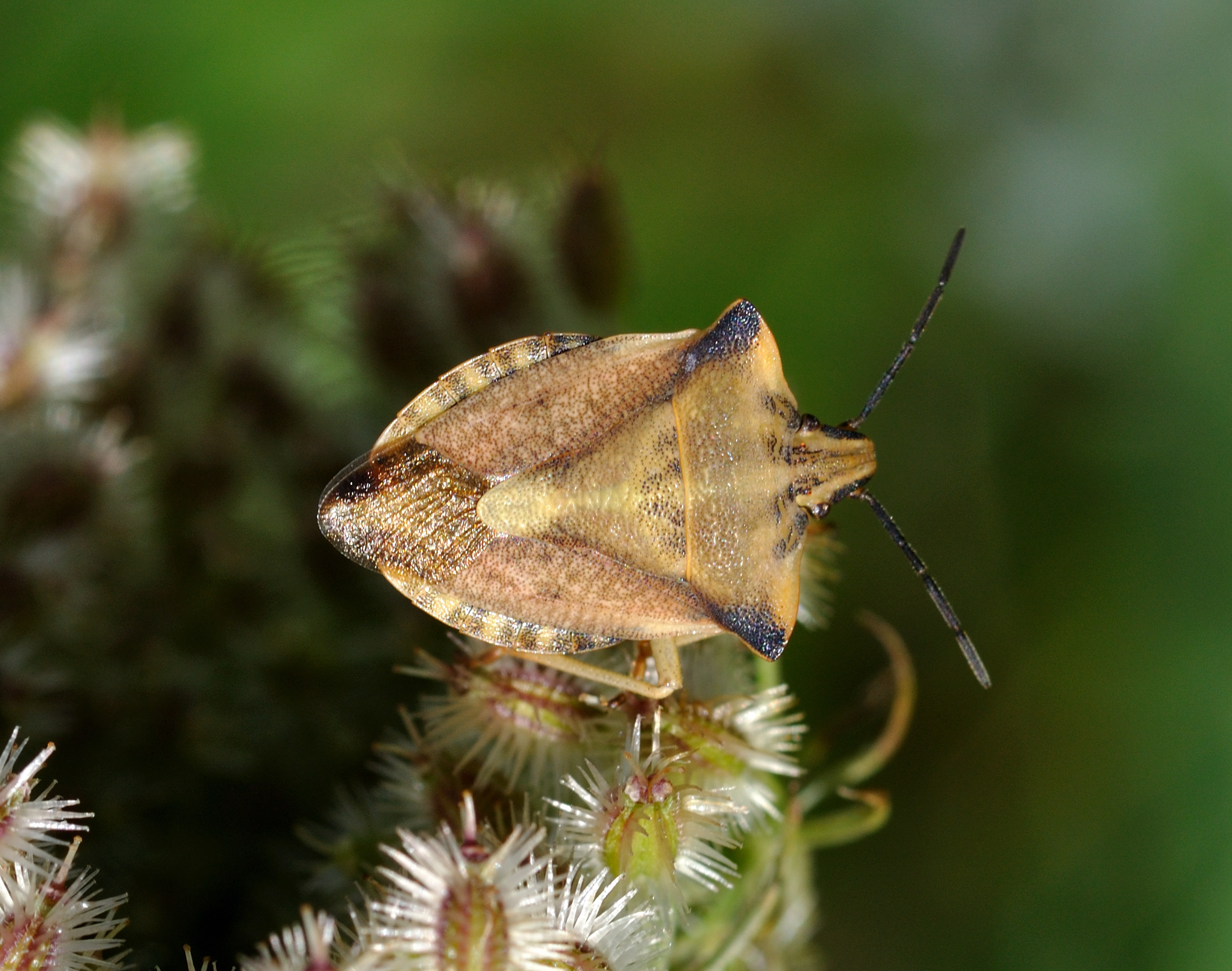
- Adult

Scientific classification
- Kingdom: Animalia
- Phylum: Arthropoda
- Clade: Pancrustacea
- Class: Insecta
- Order: Hemiptera
- Suborder: Heteroptera
- Family: Pentatomidae
- Genus: Carpocoris
- Species: C. fuscispinus

Binomial name
- Carpocoris fuscispinus (Boheman, 1851)

Synonyms
- Carpocoris atra Tamanini, 1959; Carpocoris flavescens Seabra, 1925; Carpocoris incerta Tamanini, 1959; Carpocoris infuscatus Seabra, 1925; Carpocoris maculifera Tamanini, 1959; Carpocoris maculosa Tamanini, 1959; Carpocoris rugicollis Seabra, 1925; Carpocoris subrufus Seabra, 1925; Cimex fuscispinus Boheman, 1850; Pentatoma hahni Flor, 1856

= Carpocoris fuscispinus =

Species of true bug

Carpocoris fuscispinus is a species of shield bug in the family Pentatomidae.

== Subspecies ==
- Carpocoris fuscispinus hahni (Flor, 1856)
- Carpocoris fuscispinus incerta (Tamanini, 1959)
- Carpocoris fuscispinus maculosa (Tamanini, 1959)
- Carpocoris fuscispinus mediterranea (Tamanini, 1959)

== Description ==
Carpocoris fuscispinus can reach a length of 11–14 millimetres (0.43–0.55 in). The basic colour of the body is quite variable, ranging from greyish yellow to reddish brown, with tiny black dots. It has a sharp angled pronotum, most prominent in the summer than in autumn. Antennae are black.

== Ecology ==
Larvae are polyphagous, but they mainly occur on plants of the families Apiaceae and Asteraceae. Adults are commonly found from June to October. These shield bugs overwinter as adults.

== Distribution and habitat ==
This species is widespread throughout Europe. It mainly occurs in deciduous and mixed forest areas.

== Gallery ==
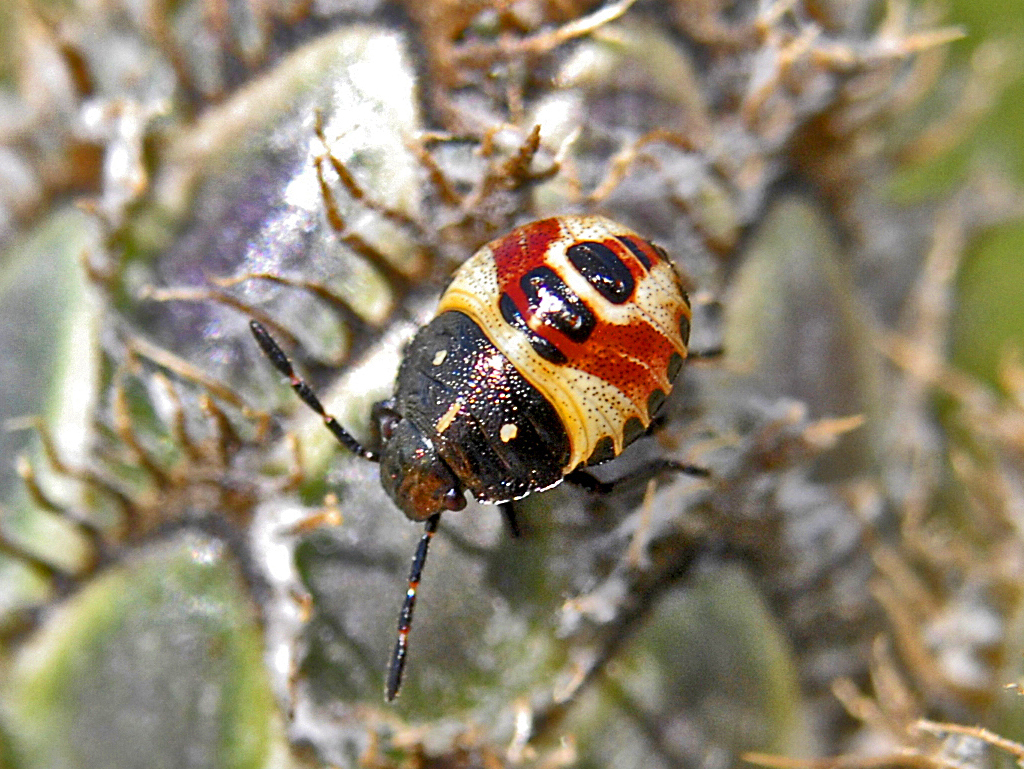
Carpocoris fuscispinus, nymph

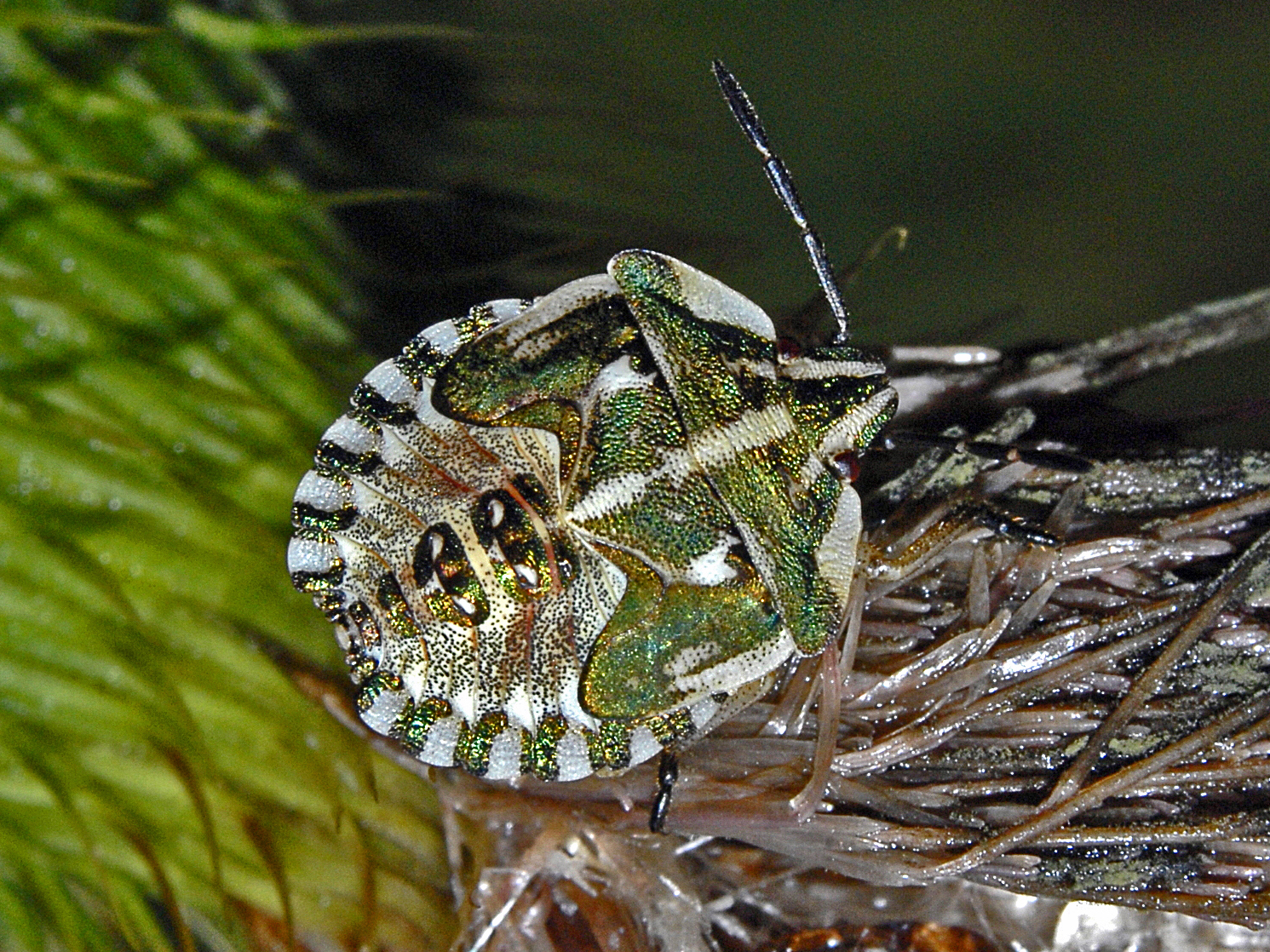
Carpocoris fuscispinus, nymph

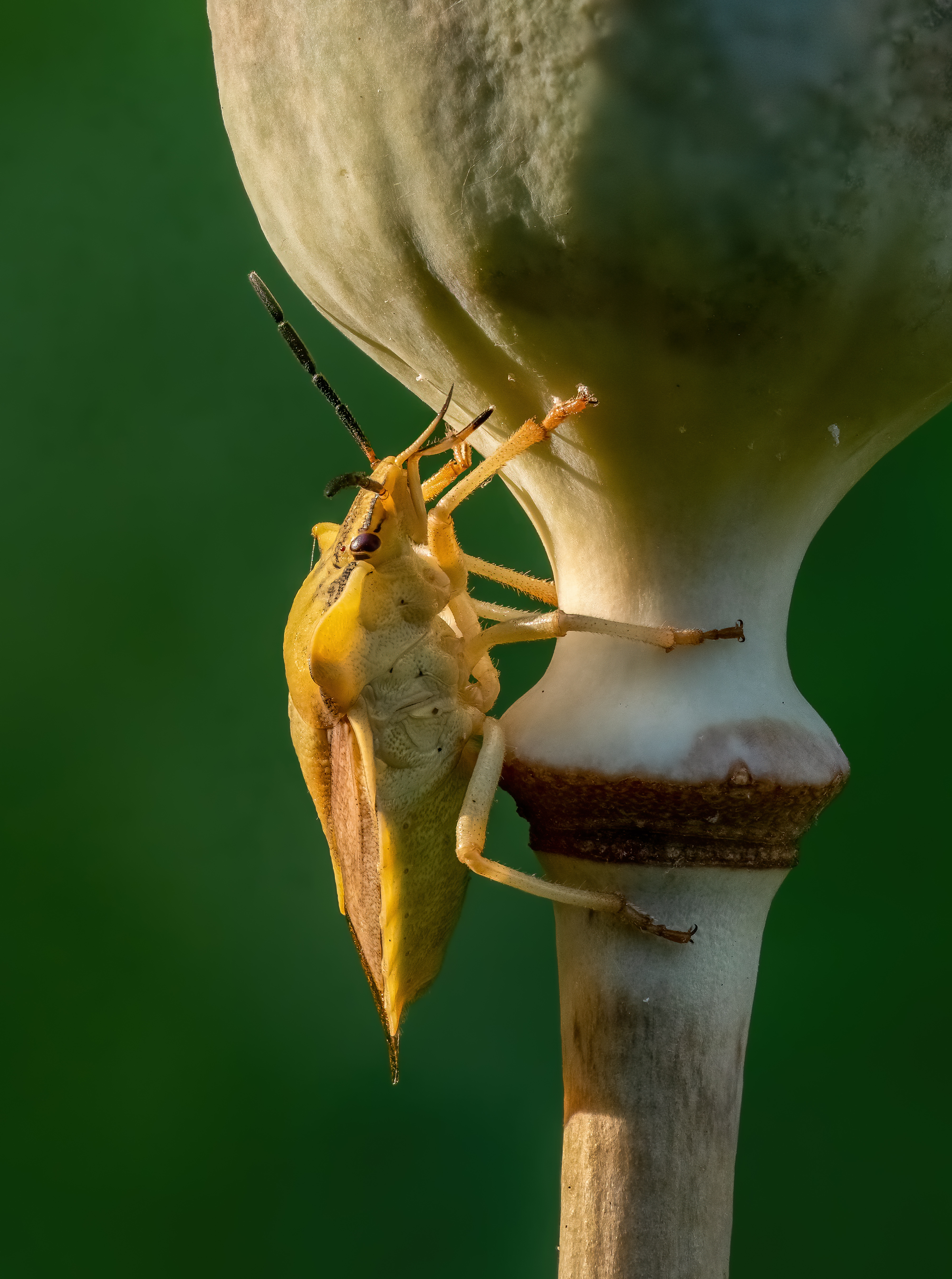
Carpocoris fuscispinus, side view, on the seed of a poppy flower

== Bibliography ==
- Michael Chinery, Insectes de France et d'Europe occidentale, Paris, Flammarion, (ISBN 978-2-0812-8823-2), pg. 74-75
- Metathoracic scent glands (MTGs) of Carpocoris fuscispinus (Boheman, 1851) (Heteroptera: Pentatomidae)
