= List of Lycosidae species =

This page lists all described species of the spider family Lycosidae as of December 29, 2013.

== Acantholycosa ==
Acantholycosa Dahl, 1908

- Acantholycosa aborigenica Zyuzin & Marusik, 1988 — Russia, Mongolia
- Acantholycosa altaiensis Marusik, Azarkina & Koponen, 2004 — Russia
- Acantholycosa azarkinae Marusik & Omelko, 2011 — Russia
- Acantholycosa azheganovae (Lobanova, 1978) — Russia
- Acantholycosa azyuzini Marusik, Hippa & Koponen, 1996 — Russia
- Acantholycosa baltoroi (Caporiacco, 1935) — Kashmir, Nepal, China
- Acantholycosa dudkoromani Marusik, Azarkina & Koponen, 2004 — Russia
- Acantholycosa dudkorum Marusik, Azarkina & Koponen, 2004 — Russia
- Acantholycosa katunensis Marusik, Azarkina & Koponen, 2004 — Russia
- Acantholycosa khakassica Marusik, Azarkina & Koponen, 2004 — Russia
- Acantholycosa kurchumensis Marusik, Azarkina & Koponen, 2004 — Kazakhstan
- Acantholycosa levinae Marusik, Azarkina & Koponen, 2004 — Russia
- Acantholycosa lignaria (Clerck, 1757) — Palearctic
- Acantholycosa logunovi Marusik, Azarkina & Koponen, 2004 — Russia
- Acantholycosa mordkovitchi Marusik, Azarkina & Koponen, 2004 — Russia
- Acantholycosa norvegica (Thorell, 1872) — Palearctic
  - Acantholycosa norvegica sudetica (L. Koch, 1875) — Europe
- Acantholycosa oligerae Marusik, Azarkina & Koponen, 2004 — Russia
- Acantholycosa paraplumalis Marusik, Azarkina & Koponen, 2004 — Russia
- Acantholycosa pedestris (Simon, 1876) — Europe
- Acantholycosa petrophila Marusik, Azarkina & Koponen, 2004 — Russia
- Acantholycosa plumalis Marusik, Azarkina & Koponen, 2004 — Russia
- Acantholycosa sayanensis Marusik, Azarkina & Koponen, 2004 — Russia
- Acantholycosa solituda (Levi & Levi, 1951) — USA, Canada
- Acantholycosa spinembolus Marusik, Azarkina & Koponen, 2004 — Russia
- Acantholycosa sterneri (Marusik, 1993) — Russia, Mongolia
- Acantholycosa sundukovi Marusik, Azarkina & Koponen, 2004 — Russia
- Acantholycosa tarbagataica Marusik & Logunov, 2011 — Kazakhstan
- Acantholycosa zinchenkoi Marusik, Azarkina & Koponen, 2004 — Russia, Kazakhstan

== Adelocosa ==
Adelocosa Gertsch, 1973

- Adelocosa anops Gertsch, 1973 — Hawaii

== Agalenocosa ==
Agalenocosa Mello-Leitao, 1944

- Agalenocosa bryantae (Roewer, 1951) — Hispaniola
- Agalenocosa chacoensis (Mello-Leitao, 1942) — Argentina
- Agalenocosa denisi (Caporiacco, 1947) — Guyana
- Agalenocosa fallax (L. Koch, 1877) — Queensland
- Agalenocosa fimbriata Mello-Leitao, 1944 — Argentina
- Agalenocosa gentilis Mello-Leitao, 1944 — Argentina
- Agalenocosa helvola (C. L. Koch, 1847) — Mexico, Colombia
- Agalenocosa kolbei (Dahl, 1908) — Bismarck Archipel
- Agalenocosa luteonigra (Mello-Leitao, 1945) — Argentina
- Agalenocosa melanotaenia (Mello-Leitao, 1941) — Argentina
- Agalenocosa pickeli (Mello-Leitao, 1937) — Brazil
- Agalenocosa punctata Mello-Leitao, 1944 — Argentina
- Agalenocosa singularis Mello-Leitao, 1944 — Argentina
- Agalenocosa subinermis (Simon, 1897) — India
- Agalenocosa yaucensis (Petrunkevitch, 1929) — Puerto Rico

== Aglaoctenus ==
Aglaoctenus Tullgren, 1905

- Aglaoctenus castaneus (Mello-Leitao, 1942) — Brazil, Ecuador, Peru, Argentina
- Aglaoctenus lagotis (Holmberg, 1876) — Colombia to Argentina
- Aglaoctenus oblongus (C. L. Koch, 1847) — Brazil, Uruguay, Argentina
- Aglaoctenus puyen Piacentini, 2011 — Argentina
- Aglaoctenus yacytata Piacentini, 2011 — Argentina

== Algidus ==
Algidus Simon, 1898

- Algidus marmoratus Simon, 1898 — Venezuela

== Allocosa ==
Allocosa Banks, 1900

- Allocosa abmingani (Hickman, 1944) — South Australia
- Allocosa absoluta (Gertsch, 1934) — USA, Mexico
- Allocosa adolphifriederici (Strand, 1913) — Central, East Africa, Zanzibar
- Allocosa albiconspersa Roewer, 1959 — Rwanda
- Allocosa albonotata (Schmidt, 1895) — Russia
- Allocosa algoensis (Pocock, 1900) — South Africa
- Allocosa alticeps (Mello-Leitao, 1944) — Argentina
- Allocosa apora (Gertsch, 1934) — USA to Costa Rica
- Allocosa aurata (Purcell, 1903) — South Africa
- Allocosa aurichelis Roewer, 1959 — South Africa
- Allocosa bersabae Roewer, 1959 — Namibia
- Allocosa biserialis Roewer, 1959 — Congo
- Allocosa brasiliensis (Petrunkevitch, 1910) — Brazil, Uruguay, Argentina, Chile
- Allocosa caboverdensis Schmidt & Krause, 1995 — Cape Verde Islands
- Allocosa calamarica (Strand, 1914) — Colombia
- Allocosa cambridgei (Simon, 1876) — Turkey, Syria
- Allocosa chamberlini (Gertsch, 1934) — USA
- Allocosa clariventris (Guy, 1966) — Morocco
- Allocosa comotti (Thorell, 1887) — Myanmar
- Allocosa danneili (Dahl, 1908) — Bismarck Archipel
- Allocosa delagoa Roewer, 1959 — Mozambique
- Allocosa delesserti (Caporiacco, 1941) — Ethiopia
- Allocosa deserticola (Simon, 1898) — Egypt
- Allocosa dingosaeformis (Guy, 1966) — Morocco
- Allocosa dubia (Walckenaer, 1837) — Brazil
- Allocosa dufouri (Simon, 1876) — Portugal, Spain
- Allocosa edeala Roewer, 1959 — Cameroon
- Allocosa efficiens Roewer, 1959 — Congo, Rwanda
- Allocosa excusor (L. Koch, 1867) — Queensland
- Allocosa exserta Roewer, 1959 — Botswana, South Africa
- Allocosa faberrima (Simon, 1910) — Namibia
- Allocosa finkei (Hickman, 1944) — South Australia
- Allocosa flavisternis (L. Koch, 1877) — Queensland, New South Wales
- Allocosa floridiana (Chamberlin, 1908) — USA
- Allocosa funerea (Hentz, 1844) — USA
- Allocosa furtiva (Gertsch, 1934) — USA
- Allocosa gabesia Roewer, 1959 — Tunisia
- Allocosa glochidea Roewer, 1959 — Namibia
- Allocosa gorontalensis (Merian, 1911) — Sulawesi
- Allocosa gracilitarsis (Purcell, 1903) — South Africa
- Allocosa guianensis (Caporiacco, 1947) — Guyana
- Allocosa halei (Hickman, 1944) — Northern Territory
- Allocosa handschini (Schenkel, 1937) — Morocco
- Allocosa hasselti (L. Koch, 1877) — Queensland, South Australia
- Allocosa hirsuta (Bösenberg & Lenz, 1895) — Central, East Africa
- Allocosa hostilis (L. Koch, 1877) — Fiji
- Allocosa hugonis (Strand, 1911) — Aru Islands
- Allocosa illegalis (Strand, 1906) — Ethiopia
- Allocosa ituriana (Strand, 1913) — Central Africa
- Allocosa iturianella Roewer, 1959 — Kenya, Uganda
- Allocosa kalaharensis (Simon, 1910) — Namibia, South Africa
- Allocosa karissimbica (Strand, 1913) — Central, East Africa
- Allocosa kazibana Roewer, 1959 — Congo, Rwanda, Tanzania
- Allocosa kulagini (Spassky, 1941) — Tajikistan
- Allocosa laetella (Strand, 1907) — Moluccas
- Allocosa lawrencei (Roewer, 1951) — South Africa
- Allocosa leucotricha Roewer, 1959 — Congo
- Allocosa lombokensis (Strand, 1913) — Lombok
- Allocosa mafensis (Lawrence, 1927) — Namibia
- Allocosa mahengea Roewer, 1959 — Tanzania
- Allocosa manmaka Roewer, 1960 — Afghanistan
- Allocosa maroccana Roewer, 1959 — Morocco
- Allocosa marshalli (Pocock, 1901) — South Africa
- Allocosa martinicensis (Strand, 1910) — Martinique
- Allocosa marua Roewer, 1959 — Cameroon
- Allocosa mascatensis (Simon, 1898) — Oman
- Allocosa mexicana (Banks, 1898) — Mexico
- Allocosa millica (Strand, 1906) — USA
- Allocosa mirabilis (Strand, 1906) — Ethiopia
- Allocosa mogadorensis (Simon, 1909) — Morocco
- Allocosa mokiensis Gertsch, 1934 — USA
- Allocosa molicola (Strand, 1906) — Ethiopia
- Allocosa montana Roewer, 1959 — Tanzania
- Allocosa morelosiana (Gertsch & Davis, 1940) — USA, Mexico
- Allocosa mossambica Roewer, 1959 — Mozambique
- Allocosa mossamedesa Roewer, 1959 — Angola
- Allocosa mulaiki (Gertsch, 1934) — USA
- Allocosa mutilata Mello-Leitao, 1937 — Brazil
- Allocosa nanahuensis (Badcock, 1932) — Paraguay
- Allocosa nebulosa Roewer, 1959 — Congo
- Allocosa nigella (Caporiacco, 1940) — Ethiopia
- Allocosa nigripes (Guy, 1966) — Morocco
- Allocosa nigriventris (Guy, 1966) — Morocco
- Allocosa nigrofulva (Caporiacco, 1955) — Venezuela
- Allocosa noctuabunda (Montgomery, 1904) — USA, Mexico
- Allocosa obscuroides (Strand, 1906) — Java, Australia
- Allocosa obturata (Lawrence, 1928) — Namibia
- Allocosa olivieri (Simon, 1876) — Syria, Israel
- Allocosa orinus (Chamberlin, 1916) — Peru
- Allocosa otavia Roewer, 1959 — Namibia
- Allocosa palabunda (L. Koch, 1877) — Australia, New Caledonia
- Allocosa pallideflava (Lawrence, 1936) — Namibia
- Allocosa panamena Chamberlin, 1925 — Mexico to Ecuador
- Allocosa paraguayensis (Roewer, 1951) — Paraguay
- Allocosa pardala (Strand, 1909) — Brazil
- Allocosa parva (Banks, 1894) — USA to Costa Rica
- Allocosa parvivulva (Lawrence, 1927) — Namibia
- Allocosa pellita Roewer, 1960 — Afghanistan
- Allocosa perfecta Roewer, 1959 — Namibia
- Allocosa pistia (Strand, 1913) — Central, East Africa
- Allocosa plumipes Roewer, 1959 — Tanzania
- Allocosa pugnatrix (Keyserling, 1877) — Central America, West Indies
- Allocosa pulchella Roewer, 1959 — Namibia
- Allocosa pylora Chamberlin, 1925 — USA
- Allocosa quadrativulva (Caporiacco, 1955) — Venezuela
- Allocosa retenta (Gertsch & Wallace, 1935) — USA
- Allocosa ruwenzorensis (Strand, 1913) — East Africa
- Allocosa samoana (Roewer, 1951) — Samoa
- Allocosa sangtoda Roewer, 1960 — Afghanistan
- Allocosa schoenlandi (Pocock, 1900) — South Africa
- Allocosa schubotzi (Strand, 1913) — Rwanda
- Allocosa sefrana (Schenkel, 1937) — Algeria
- Allocosa sennaris Roewer, 1959 — Sudan
- Allocosa sjostedti (Lessert, 1926) — East Africa, Rwanda
- Allocosa soluta (Tullgren, 1905) — Bolivia
- Allocosa sublata (Montgomery, 1902) — USA
- Allocosa suboculata Guy, 1966 — North Africa
- Allocosa subparva Dondale & Redner, 1983 — USA, Mexico
- Allocosa tagax (Thorell, 1897) — Myanmar
- Allocosa tangana Roewer, 1959 — Tanzania
- Allocosa tarentulina (Audouin, 1826) — North Africa
- Allocosa tenebrosa (Thorell, 1897) — Myanmar
- Allocosa testacea Roewer, 1959 — South Africa
- Allocosa thieli (Dahl, 1908) — Bismarck Archipel
- Allocosa tremens (O. P.-Cambridge, 1876) — North Africa
- Allocosa tuberculipalpa (Caporiacco, 1940) — Central, East Africa
- Allocosa umtalica (Purcell, 1903) — East, Southern Africa
- Allocosa utahana Dondale & Redner, 1983 — USA
- Allocosa venezuelica (Caporiacco, 1955) — Venezuela
- Allocosa veracruzana (Gertsch & Davis, 1940) — Mexico
- Allocosa wittei Roewer, 1959 — Congo
- Allocosa woodwardi (Simon, 1909) — Western Australia
- Allocosa yurae (Strand, 1908) — Peru, Chile
- Allocosa zualella (Strand, 1907) — New South Wales

== Allotrochosina ==
Allotrochosina Roewer, 1960

- Allotrochosina karri Vink, 2001 — Western Australia
- Allotrochosina schauinslandi (Simon, 1899) — New Zealand, Chatham Islands
- Allotrochosina walesiana Framenau, 2008 — New South Wales

== Alopecosa ==
Alopecosa Simon, 1885

- Alopecosa accentuata (Latreille, 1817) — Palearctic
- Alopecosa aculeata (Clerck, 1757) — Holarctic
- Alopecosa akkolka Marusik, 1995 — Kazakhstan, China
- Alopecosa albofasciata (Brulle, 1832) — Mediterranean to Central Asia
  - Alopecosa albofasciata rufa (Franganillo, 1918) — Spain
- Alopecosa albostriata (Grube, 1861) — Russia, Kazakhstan, China, Korea
- Alopecosa albovittata (Schmidt, 1895) — Russia
- Alopecosa alpicola (Simon, 1876) — Palearctic
  - Alopecosa alpicola soriculata (Simon, 1876) — France, Italy
  - Alopecosa alpicola vidua (Simon, 1937) — France
- Alopecosa andesiana (Berland, 1913) — Ecuador
- Alopecosa artenarensis Wunderlich, 1992 — Canary Islands
- Alopecosa atis Caporiacco, 1949 — North Africa
- Alopecosa atypica Ponomarev, 2008 — Kazakhstan
- Alopecosa auripilosa (Schenkel, 1953) — Russia, China, Korea
- Alopecosa aurita Chen, Song & Kim, 2001 — China
- Alopecosa azsheganovae Esyunin, 1996 — Russia
- Alopecosa balinensis (Giltay, 1935) — Bali
- Alopecosa barbipes (Sundevall, 1833) — Palearctic
  - Alopecosa barbipes oreophila (Simon, 1937) — France
- Alopecosa beckeri (Thorell, 1875) — Ukraine
- Alopecosa camerunensis Roewer, 1960 — Cameroon
- Alopecosa canaricola Schmidt, 1982 — Canary Islands
- Alopecosa cedroensis Wunderlich, 1992 — Canary Islands
- Alopecosa chagyabensis Hu & Li, 1987 — China
- Alopecosa cinnameopilosa (Schenkel, 1963) — Russia, China, Korea, Japan
- Alopecosa cronebergi (Thorell, 1875) — Hungary, Russia, Ukraine
- Alopecosa cuneata (Clerck, 1757) — Palearctic
- Alopecosa cursor (Hahn, 1831) — Palearctic
  - Alopecosa cursor cursorioides Charitonov, 1969 — Russia, Central Asia
- Alopecosa curtohirta Tang, Urita & Song, 1993 — China
- Alopecosa deserta Ponomarev, 2007 — Kazakhstan
- Alopecosa disca Tang et al., 1997 — China
- Alopecosa dryada Cordes, 1996 — Greece
- Alopecosa edax (Thorell, 1875) — Poland, China
- Alopecosa ermolaevi Savelyeva, 1972 — Kazakhstan
- Alopecosa etrusca Lugetti & Tongiorgi, 1969 — Italy, Turkey
- Alopecosa exasperans (O. P.-Cambridge, 1877) — Canada, Greenland
- Alopecosa fabrilis (Clerck, 1757) — Palearctic
  - Alopecosa fabrilis trinacriae Lugetti & Tongiorgi, 1969 — Sicily
- Alopecosa farinosa (Herman, 1879) — Central Asia
- Alopecosa fedotovi (Charitonov, 1946) — Central Asia
- Alopecosa fuerteventurensis Wunderlich, 1992 — Canary Islands
- Alopecosa fulvastra Caporiacco, 1955 — Venezuela
- Alopecosa gomerae (Strand, 1911) — Canary Islands
- Alopecosa gracilis (Bösenberg, 1895) — Canary Islands
- Alopecosa grancanariensis Wunderlich, 1992 — Canary Islands
- Alopecosa hamata (Schenkel, 1963) — China
- Alopecosa hermiguensis Wunderlich, 1992 — Canary Islands
- Alopecosa himalayaensis Hu, 2001 — China
- Alopecosa hingganica Tang, Urita & Song, 1993 — Mongolia, China
- Alopecosa hirta (Kulczynski, 1908) — Russia
- Alopecosa hirtipes (Kulczynski, 1907) — Canada, Alaska, Russia
- Alopecosa hoevelsi Schmidt & Barensteiner, 2000 — China
- Alopecosa hokkaidensis Tanaka, 1985 — Russia, China, Japan
- Alopecosa huabanna Chen, Song & Gao, 2000 — China
- Alopecosa hui Chen, Song & Kim, 2001 — China
- Alopecosa inderensis Ponomarev, 2007 — Kazakhstan
- Alopecosa inimica (O. P.-Cambridge, 1885) — Tajikistan
- Alopecosa inquilina (Clerck, 1757) — Palearctic
- Alopecosa irinae Lobanova, 1978 — Russia
- Alopecosa kalahariana Roewer, 1960 — Botswana
- Alopecosa kalavrita Buchar, 2001 — Greece
- Alopecosa kaplanovi Oliger, 1983 — Russia
- Alopecosa kasakhstanica Savelyeva, 1972 — Russia, Kazakhstan
- Alopecosa kochi (Keyserling, 1877) — North America
- Alopecosa kovblyuki Nadolny & Ponomarev, 2012 — Russia, Ukraine
- Alopecosa kratochvili (Schenkel, 1963) — China
- Alopecosa kronebergi Andreeva, 1976 — Central Asia
- Alopecosa krynickii (Thorell, 1875) — Ukraine
- Alopecosa kulczynski Sternbergs, 1979 — Russia
- Alopecosa kulczynskii (Bösenberg, 1895) — Canary Islands
- Alopecosa kulsaryensis Ponomarev, 2012 — Kazakhstan
- Alopecosa kungurica Esyunin, 1996 — Russia
- Alopecosa kuntzi Denis, 1953 — Sicily, Yemen
- Alopecosa laciniosa (Simon, 1876) — France
- Alopecosa lallemandi (Berland, 1913) — Ecuador
- Alopecosa latifasciata (Kroneberg, 1875) — Central Asia
- Alopecosa leonhardii (Strand, 1913) — Central Australia
- Alopecosa lessertiana Brignoli, 1983 — China
- Alopecosa licenti (Schenkel, 1953) — Russia, Mongolia, China, Korea
- Alopecosa lindbergi Roewer, 1960 — Afghanistan
- Alopecosa linzhan Chen & Song, 2003 — China
- Alopecosa litvinovi Izmailova, 1989 — Russia
- Alopecosa longicymbia Savelyeva, 1972 — Kazakhstan
- Alopecosa madigani (Hickman, 1944) — Northern Territory
- Alopecosa mariae (Dahl, 1908) — Palearctic
  - Alopecosa mariae orientalis (Kolosvary, 1934) — Hungary
- Alopecosa marikovskyi Logunov, 2013 — Kazakhstan
- Alopecosa medvedevi Ponomarev, 2009 — Kazakhstan
- Alopecosa mikhailovi Omelko, Marusik & Koponen, 2013 — Sakhalin Islands
- Alopecosa moesta (Holmberg, 1876) — Argentina
- Alopecosa mojonia (Mello-Leitao, 1941) — Argentina
- Alopecosa moriutii Tanaka, 1985 — Russia, Korea, Japan
- Alopecosa mutabilis (Kulczynski, 1908) — Russia, Alaska
- Alopecosa nagpag Chen, Song & Kim, 2001 — China
- Alopecosa nemurensis (Strand, 1907) — Japan
- Alopecosa nigricans (Simon, 1886) — Argentina, Falkland Islands
- Alopecosa nitidus Hu, 2001 — China
- Alopecosa notabilis (Schmidt, 1895) — Kazakhstan
- Alopecosa nybelini Roewer, 1960 — Afghanistan
- Alopecosa oahuensis (Keyserling, 1890) — Hawaii
- Alopecosa obscura Schmidt, 1980 — Canary Islands
- Alopecosa obsoleta (C. L. Koch, 1847) — Turkmenistan
- Alopecosa orbisaca Peng et al., 1997 — China
- Alopecosa orotavensis (Strand, 1916) — Canary Islands
- Alopecosa osa Marusik, Hippa & Koponen, 1996 — Russia
- Alopecosa osellai Lugetti & Tongiorgi, 1969 — Spain
- Alopecosa ovalis Chen, Song & Gao, 2000 — China
- Alopecosa palmae Schmidt, 1982 — Canary Islands
- Alopecosa pelusiaca (Audouin, 1826) — North Africa
- Alopecosa pentheri (Nosek, 1905) — Bulgaria, Greece to Azerbaijan
- Alopecosa pictilis (Emerton, 1885) — Holarctic
- Alopecosa pinetorum (Thorell, 1856) — Palearctic
- Alopecosa psammophila Buchar, 2001 — Czech Republic, Slovakia, Hungary, Russia
- Alopecosa pseudocuneata (Schenkel, 1953) — China
- Alopecosa pulverulenta (Clerck, 1757) — Palearctic
  - Alopecosa pulverulenta tridentina (Thorell, 1875) — Austria
- Alopecosa raddei (Simon, 1889) — Central Asia
- Alopecosa rapa (Karsch, 1881) — Gilbert Islands
- Alopecosa reimoseri (Kolosvary, 1934) — Hungary
- Alopecosa restricta Mello-Leitao, 1940 — Argentina
- Alopecosa roeweri (Rosca, 1937) — Ukraine
- Alopecosa rosea Mello-Leitao, 1945 — Argentina
- Alopecosa saurica Marusik, 1995 — Kazakhstan
- Alopecosa schmidti (Hahn, 1835) — Palearctic
- Alopecosa sciophila Ponomarev, 2008 — Kazakhstan
- Alopecosa sibirica (Kulczynski, 1908) — Russia, Mongolia, China
- Alopecosa simoni (Thorell, 1872) — Mediterranean
- Alopecosa sokhondoensis Logunov & Marusik, 1995 — Russia
- Alopecosa solitaria (Herman, 1879) — Europe, Russia
- Alopecosa solivaga (Kulczynski, 1901) — Russia, Mongolia, China
  - Alopecosa solivaga annulata (Kulczynski, 1916) — Russia
  - Alopecosa solivaga borea (Kulczynski, 1908) — Russia
  - Alopecosa solivaga katunjica (Ermolajev, 1937) — Russia
  - Alopecosa solivaga lineata (Kulczynski, 1916) — Russia
- Alopecosa spasskyi Ponomarev, 2008 — Kazakhstan
- Alopecosa spinata Yu & Song, 1988 — China
- Alopecosa steppica Ponomarev, 2007 — Russia
- Alopecosa strandi (Rosca, 1936) — Romania, Ukraine
- Alopecosa striatipes (C. L. Koch, 1839) — Europe to Central Asia
- Alopecosa sublimbata Roewer, 1960 — Bioko
- Alopecosa subrufa (Schenkel, 1963) — Russia, Mongolia, China
- Alopecosa subsolitaria Savelyeva, 1972 — Kazakhstan
- Alopecosa subvalida Guy, 1966 — Morocco
- Alopecosa sulzeri (Pavesi, 1873) — Palearctic
- Alopecosa taeniata (C. L. Koch, 1835) — Palearctic
- Alopecosa taeniopus (Kulczynski, 1895) — Bulgaria to China
- Alopecosa tanakai Omelko & Marusik, 2008 — Russia
- Alopecosa thaleri Hepner & Paulus, 2007 — Canary Islands
- Alopecosa trabalis (Clerck, 1757) — Europe to Central Asia
  - Alopecosa trabalis albica (Franganillo, 1913) — Spain
- Alopecosa tunetana Roewer, 1960 — Tunisia
- Alopecosa uiensis Esyunin, 1996 — Russia
- Alopecosa upembania Roewer, 1960 — Congo
- Alopecosa valida (Lucas, 1846) — Morocco, Algeria
- Alopecosa virgata (Kishida, 1909) — Russia, Korea, Japan
- Alopecosa volubilis Yoo, Kim & Tanaka, 2004 — Russia, Korea, Japan
- Alopecosa wenxianensis Tang et al., 1997 — China
- Alopecosa xilinensis Peng et al., 1997 — China
- Alopecosa xiningensis Hu, 2001 — China
- Alopecosa xinjiangensis Hu & Wu, 1989 — Mongolia, China
- Alopecosa yamalensis Esyunin, 1996 — Russia
- Alopecosa zyuzini Logunov & Marusik, 1995 — Russia, Mongolia

== Amblyothele ==
Amblyothele Simon, 1910

- Amblyothele albocincta Simon, 1910 — Botswana
- Amblyothele atlantica Russell-Smith, Jocque & Alderweireldt, 2009 — Cameroon
- Amblyothele ecologica Russell-Smith, Jocque & Alderweireldt, 2009 — South Africa
- Amblyothele hamatula Russell-Smith, Jocque & Alderweireldt, 2009 — Ivory Coast
- Amblyothele kivumba Russell-Smith, Jocque & Alderweireldt, 2009 — Rwanda
- Amblyothele latedissipata Russell-Smith, Jocque & Alderweireldt, 2009 — Tanzania, Mozambique, South Africa
- Amblyothele longipes Russell-Smith, Jocque & Alderweireldt, 2009 — Ivory Coast, Togo
- Amblyothele togona Roewer, 1960 — Ivory Coast, Cameroon, Togo, Congo, Kenya

== Anomalomma ==
Anomalomma Simon, 1890

- Anomalomma harishi Dyal, 1935 — Pakistan
- Anomalomma lycosinum Simon, 1890 — Java
- Anomalomma rhodesianum Roewer, 1960 — Zimbabwe

== Anomalosa ==
Anomalosa Roewer, 1960

- Anomalosa kochi (Simon, 1898) — Queensland
- Anomalosa oz Framenau, 2006 — South Australia, New South Wales, Victoria

== Anoteropsis ==
Anoteropsis L. Koch, 1878

- Anoteropsis adumbrata (Urquhart, 1887) — New Zealand, Stewart Islands
- Anoteropsis aerescens (Goyen, 1887) — New Zealand
- Anoteropsis alpina Vink, 2002 — New Zealand
- Anoteropsis arenivaga (Dalmas, 1917) — New Zealand
- Anoteropsis blesti Vink, 2002 — New Zealand
- Anoteropsis canescens (Goyen, 1887) — New Zealand
- Anoteropsis cantuaria Vink, 2002 — New Zealand
- Anoteropsis flavescens L. Koch, 1878 — New Zealand
- Anoteropsis flavovittata Simon, 1880 — New Caledonia
- Anoteropsis forsteri Vink, 2002 — New Zealand, Stewart Islands
- Anoteropsis hallae Vink, 2002 — New Zealand
- Anoteropsis hilaris (L. Koch, 1877) — New Zealand, Stewart Islands, Auckland Islands
- Anoteropsis insularis Vink, 2002 — Chatham Islands, Pitt Islands
- Anoteropsis lacustris Vink, 2002 — New Zealand
- Anoteropsis litoralis Vink, 2002 — New Zealand
- Anoteropsis montana Vink, 2002 — New Zealand
- Anoteropsis okatainae Vink, 2002 — New Zealand
- Anoteropsis papuana Thorell, 1881 — New Guinea
- Anoteropsis ralphi (Simon, 1905) — Chatham Islands
- Anoteropsis senica (L. Koch, 1877) — New Zealand, Stewart Islands
- Anoteropsis urquharti (Simon, 1898) — New Zealand
- Anoteropsis virgata (Karsch, 1880) — Polynesia
- Anoteropsis westlandica Vink, 2002 — New Zealand

== Arctosa ==
Arctosa C. L. Koch, 1847

- Arctosa albida (Simon, 1898) — South Africa
- Arctosa albopellita (L. Koch, 1875) — Ethiopia
- Arctosa algerina Roewer, 1960 — Algeria
- Arctosa aliusmodi (Karsch, 1880) — Polynesia
- Arctosa alluaudi Guy, 1966 — Morocco
- Arctosa alpigena (Doleschall, 1852) — Holarctic
  - Arctosa alpigena lamperti Dahl, 1908 — Central, Eastern Europe
- Arctosa amylaceoides (Schenkel, 1936) — China
- Arctosa andina (Chamberlin, 1916) — Peru
- Arctosa astuta (GerstÃ€cker, 1873) — Central Africa
- Arctosa atriannulipes (Strand, 1906) — Ethiopia
- Arctosa atroventrosa (Lenz, 1886) — Madagascar
- Arctosa aussereri (Keyserling, 1877) — Puerto Rico, Colombia
- Arctosa bacchabunda (Karsch, 1884) — Sao Tome
- Arctosa bakva (Roewer, 1960) — Afghanistan
- Arctosa berlandi (Caporiacco, 1949) — East Africa
- Arctosa bicoloripes (Roewer, 1960) — Rwanda
- Arctosa biseriata Roewer, 1960 — Congo
- Arctosa bogotensis (Keyserling, 1877) — Colombia
- Arctosa brauni (Strand, 1916) — East Africa
- Arctosa brevialva (Franganillo, 1913) — Spain
- Arctosa brevispina (Lessert, 1915) — Central, East Africa
- Arctosa camerunensis Roewer, 1960 — Cameroon
- Arctosa capensis Roewer, 1960 — South Africa
- Arctosa chungjooensis Paik, 1994 — Korea
- Arctosa cinerea (Fabricius, 1777) — Palearctic, Congo
  - Arctosa cinerea obscura (Franganillo, 1913) — Spain
- Arctosa coreana Paik, 1994 — Korea
- Arctosa daisetsuzana (Saito, 1934) — Japan
- Arctosa darountaha Roewer, 1960 — Afghanistan
- Arctosa denticulata Jimenez & Dondale, 1984 — Mexico
- Arctosa depectinata (Bösenberg & Strand, 1906) — China, Japan
- Arctosa depuncta (O. P.-Cambridge, 1876) — Libya, Egypt
- Arctosa deserta (O. P.-Cambridge, 1872) — Syria
- Arctosa dissonans (O. P.-Cambridge, 1872) — Syria, Lebanon, Israel
- Arctosa ebicha Yaginuma, 1960 — China, Korea, Japan
- Arctosa edeana Roewer, 1960 — Cameroon
- Arctosa emertoni Gertsch, 1934 — USA, Canada
- Arctosa ephippiata Roewer, 1960 — Cameroon
- Arctosa epiana (Berland, 1938) — New Hebrides
- Arctosa erythraeana Roewer, 1960 — Ethiopia
- Arctosa excellens (Simon, 1876) — Portugal, Spain
- Arctosa fessana Roewer, 1960 — Libya
- Arctosa figurata (Simon, 1876) — Europe, Russia
- Arctosa frequentissima Caporiacco, 1947 — Central, East Africa
- Arctosa fujiii Tanaka, 1985 — China, Japan
- Arctosa fulvolineata (Lucas, 1846) — Europe, Mallorca, North Africa
- Arctosa fusca (Keyserling, 1877) — Central America, West Indies
- Arctosa gougu Chen & Song, 1999 — China
- Arctosa hallasanensis Paik, 1994 — Korea
- Arctosa harraria Roewer, 1960 — Ethiopia
- Arctosa hikosanensis Tanaka, 1985 — Japan
- Arctosa himalayensis Tikader & Malhotra, 1980 — India
- Arctosa hottentotta Roewer, 1960 — Namibia
- Arctosa humicola (Bertkau, 1880) — Brazil, Guyana
- Arctosa hunanensis Yin, Peng & Bao, 1997 — China
- Arctosa inconspicua (Bryant, 1948) — Hispaniola
- Arctosa indica Tikader & Malhotra, 1980 — India, China
- Arctosa insignita (Thorell, 1872) — USA, Canada, Alaska, Greenland, Russia
- Arctosa intricaria (C. L. Koch, 1847) — Mediterranean
- Arctosa ipsa (Karsch, 1879) — Russia, Korea, Japan
- Arctosa janetscheki Buchar, 1976 — Nepal
- Arctosa kadjahkaia Roewer, 1960 — Afghanistan
- Arctosa kansuensis (Schenkel, 1936) — China
- Arctosa kassenjea (Strand, 1913) — Central, East Africa
- Arctosa kawabe Tanaka, 1985 — Russia, Korea, Japan
- Arctosa kazibana Roewer, 1960 — Congo
- Arctosa keniana (Roewer, 1960) — Congo
- Arctosa keumjeungsana Paik, 1994 — Russia, Korea
- Arctosa khudiensis (Sinha, 1951) — India, China
- Arctosa kiangsiensis (Schenkel, 1963) — China
- Arctosa kirkiana (Strand, 1913) — Central, East Africa
- Arctosa kiwuana (Strand, 1913) — Central, East Africa
- Arctosa kolosvaryi (Caporiacco, 1947) — Ethiopia
- Arctosa labiata Tso & Chen, 2004 — Taiwan
- Arctosa laccophila (Simon, 1910) — Guinea-Bissau
- Arctosa lacupemba (Roewer, 1960) — Congo
- Arctosa lacustris (Simon, 1876) — Canary Islands, Mallorca, Mediterranean
- Arctosa lagodechiensis Mcheidze, 1997 — Georgia
- Arctosa lama Dondale & Redner, 1983 — USA, Canada
- Arctosa laminata Yu & Song, 1988 — China, Japan
- Arctosa lawrencei (Roewer, 1960) — South Africa
- Arctosa leaeniformis (Simon, 1910) — Botswana
- Arctosa leopardus (Sundevall, 1833) — Palearctic
- Arctosa lesserti Reimoser, 1934 — India
- Arctosa letourneuxi (Simon, 1885) — Morocco to Tunisia
- Arctosa lightfooti (Purcell, 1903) — South Africa
- Arctosa litigiosa Roewer, 1960 — Congo, Tanzania
- Arctosa littoralis (Hentz, 1844) — North, Central America
- Arctosa liujiapingensis Yin et al., 1997 — China
- Arctosa lutetiana (Simon, 1876) — Europe, Russia
- Arctosa maculata (Hahn, 1822) — Europe, Russia, Turkey
- Arctosa maderana Roewer, 1960 — Madeira
- Arctosa marfieldi Roewer, 1960 — Cameroon
- Arctosa marocensis Roewer, 1960 — Morocco
- Arctosa meinerti (Thorell, 1875) — Algeria
- Arctosa meitanensis Yin et al., 1993 — China
- Arctosa minuta F. O. P.-Cambridge, 1902 — USA to Guyana
- Arctosa mittensa Yin et al., 1993 — China
- Arctosa mossambica Roewer, 1960 — Mozambique
- Arctosa mulani (Dyal, 1935) — India, Pakistan
- Arctosa nava Roewer, 1955 — Iran
- Arctosa niccensis (Strand, 1907) — Japan
- Arctosa ningboensis Yin, Bao & Zhang, 1996 — China
- Arctosa nivosa (Purcell, 1903) — South Africa
- Arctosa nonsignata Roewer, 1960 — Congo
- Arctosa nyembeensis (Strand, 1916) — East Africa
- Arctosa obscura Denis, 1953 — Yemen
- Arctosa oneili (Purcell, 1903) — South Africa
- Arctosa otaviensis Roewer, 1960 — Namibia
- Arctosa pardosina (Simon, 1898) — Uzbekistan
- Arctosa pargongensis Paik, 1994 — Korea
- Arctosa pelengea Roewer, 1960 — Congo
- Arctosa perita (Latreille, 1799) — Holarctic
  - Arctosa perita arenicola (Simon, 1937) — France
- Arctosa personata (L. Koch, 1872) — Western Mediterranean
- Arctosa pichoni Schenkel, 1963 — China
- Arctosa picturella (Strand, 1906) — Ethiopia
- Arctosa poecila Caporiacco, 1939 — Ethiopia
- Arctosa politana Roewer, 1960 — Ethiopia
- Arctosa promontorii (Pocock, 1900) — South Africa
- Arctosa pseudoleopardus Ponomarev, 2007 — Russia
- Arctosa pugil (Bertkau, 1880) — Brazil
- Arctosa pungcheunensis Paik, 1994 — Korea
- Arctosa quadripunctata (Lucas, 1846) — North Africa
- Arctosa raptor (Kulczynski, 1885) — Russia, Nepal, USA, Canada
- Arctosa ravida Ponomarev, 2007 — Kazakhstan
- Arctosa recurva Yu & Song, 1988 — China
- Arctosa renidescens Buchar & Thaler, 1995 — Central Europe
- Arctosa ripaecola (Roewer, 1960) — Tanzania
- Arctosa rubicunda (Keyserling, 1877) — USA, Canada
- Arctosa rufescens Roewer, 1960 — Cameroon
- Arctosa sanctaerosae Gertsch & Wallace, 1935 — USA
- Arctosa sandeshkhaliensis Majumder, 2004 — India
- Arctosa sapiranga Silva & Lise, 2009 — Brazil
- Arctosa schensiensis Schenkel, 1963 — China
- Arctosa schweinfurthi (Strand, 1906) — Ethiopia
- Arctosa scopulitibiis (Strand, 1906) — Ethiopia
- Arctosa serii Roth & Brown, 1976 — Mexico
- Arctosa serrulata Mao & Song, 1985 — China
- Arctosa similis Schenkel, 1938 — Canary Islands, Morocco, Portugal to Croatia
- Arctosa simoni Guy, 1966 — Turkey
- Arctosa sjostedti Roewer, 1960 — Tanzania
- Arctosa sordulenta (Thorell, 1899) — Cameroon
- Arctosa springiosa Yin et al., 1993 — China
- Arctosa stigmosa (Thorell, 1875) — France, Norway to Ukraine
- Arctosa subamylacea (Bösenberg & Strand, 1906) — Kazakhstan, China, Korea, Japan
- Arctosa swatowensis (Strand, 1907) — China
- Arctosa tanakai Barrion & Litsinger, 1995 — Philippines
- Arctosa tappaensis Gajbe, 2004 — India
- Arctosa tbilisiensis Mcheidze, 1946 — Bulgaria, Greece to Georgia
- Arctosa tenuissima (Purcell, 1903) — South Africa
- Arctosa testacea Roewer, 1960 — Tanzania
- Arctosa togona Roewer, 1960 — Togo
- Arctosa transvaalana Roewer, 1960 — South Africa
- Arctosa tridens (Simon, 1937) — Algeria
- Arctosa tridentata Chen & Song, 1999 — China
- Arctosa truncata Tso & Chen, 2004 — Taiwan
- Arctosa upembana Roewer, 1960 — Congo
- Arctosa vaginalis Yu & Song, 1988 — China
- Arctosa variana C. L. Koch, 1847 — Mediterranean to Central Asia
- Arctosa villica (Lucas, 1846) — Western Mediterranean
- Arctosa virgo (Chamberlin, 1925) — USA
- Arctosa wittei Roewer, 1960 — Congo, Tanzania
- Arctosa workmani (Strand, 1909) — Paraguay
- Arctosa xunyangensis Wang & Qiu, 1992 — China
- Arctosa yasudai (Tanaka, 2000) — Japan
- Arctosa ziyunensis Yin, Peng & Bao, 1997 — China

== Arctosippa ==
Arctosippa Roewer, 1960

- Arctosippa gracilis (Keyserling, 1881) — Peru

== Arctosomma ==
Arctosomma Roewer, 1960

- Arctosomma trochosiforme (Strand, 1906) — Ethiopia

== Artoria ==
Artoria Thorell, 1877

- Artoria albopedipalpis Framenau, 2002 — Victoria
- Artoria albopilata (Urquhart, 1893) — Queensland to South Australia, Tasmania
- Artoria alta Framenau, 2004 — New South Wales
- Artoria amoena (Roewer, 1960) — Congo
- Artoria avona Framenau, 2002 — South Australia, Victoria
- Artoria barringtonensis Framenau & Baehr, 2018
- Artoria beaury Framenau & Baehr, 2018
- Artoria belfordensis Framenau & Baehr, 2018
- Artoria berenice (L. Koch, 1877) — Queensland to Tasmania, New Caledonia, Vanuatu
- Artoria bondi Framenau & Baehr, 2018
- Artoria booderee Framenau & Baehr, 2018
- Artoria cingulipes Simon, 1909 — Western Australia, South Australia
- Artoria flavimana Simon, 1909 — Western Australia to New South Wales
- Artoria gloriosa (Rainbow, 1920) — Lord Howe Islands
- Artoria hebridisiana (Berland, 1938) — New Hebrides
- Artoria hospita Vink, 2002 — New Zealand
- Artoria howquaensis Framenau, 2002 — South Australia, Victoria
- Artoria impedita (Simon, 1909) — Western Australia
- Artoria ligulacea (Qu, Peng & Yin, 2009) — China
- Artoria lineata (L. Koch, 1877) — South Australia, New South Wales to Tasmania
- Artoria linnaei Framenau, 2008 — Western Australia
- Artoria lycosimorpha Strand, 1909 — South Africa
- Artoria maculatipes (Roewer, 1960) — Namibia
- Artoria mckayi Framenau, 2002 — Queensland to Tasmania
- Artoria minima (Berland, 1938) — New Hebrides
- Artoria palustris Dahl, 1908 — New Guinea, Bismarck Archipel
- Artoria parvula Thorell, 1877 — China, Philippines, Sulawesi, Northern Territory
- Artoria pruinosa (L. Koch, 1877) — New South Wales
- Artoria quadrata Framenau, 2002 — Queensland, New South Wales, Victoria
- Artoria schizocoides Framenau & Hebets, 2007 — Western Australia
- Artoria segrega Vink, 2002 — New Zealand
- Artoria separata Vink, 2002 — New Zealand
- Artoria taeniifera Simon, 1909 — Western Australia, New South Wales
- Artoria thorelli (Berland, 1929) — Samoa, Marquesas Islands
- Artoria triangularis Framenau, 2002 — South Australia, Queensland to Tasmania
- Artoria ulrichi Framenau, 2002 — New South Wales, Victoria
- Artoria victoriensis Framenau, Gotch & Austin, 2006 — South Australia, New South Wales, Victoria

== Artoriellula ==
Artoriellula Roewer, 1960

- Artoriellula bicolor (Simon, 1898) — South Africa
- Artoriellula celebensis (Merian, 1911) — Sulawesi

== Artoriopsis ==
Artoriopsis Framenau, 2007

- Artoriopsis anacardium Framenau, 2007 — Northern Territory, Queensland
- Artoriopsis eccentrica Framenau, 2007 — Western Australia, South Australia, Victoria
- Artoriopsis expolita (L. Koch, 1877) — Australia, Tasmania
- Artoriopsis joergi Framenau, 2007 — Western Australia, South Australia
- Artoriopsis klausi Framenau, 2007 — South Australia, New South Wales, Victoria
- Artoriopsis melissae Framenau, 2007 — Queensland to Tasmania
- Artoriopsis whitehouseae Framenau, 2007 — Queensland, New South Wales

== Aulonia ==
Aulonia C. L. Koch, 1847

- Aulonia albimana (Walckenaer, 1805) — Palearctic
- Aulonia kratochvili Dunin, Buchar & Absolon, 1986 — Greece to Central Asia

== Auloniella ==
Auloniella Roewer, 1960

- Auloniella maculisterna Roewer, 1960 — Tanzania

== Birabenia ==
Birabenia Mello-Leitao, 1941

- Birabenia birabenae Mello-Leitao, 1941 — Argentina
- Birabenia vittata (Mello-Leitao, 1945) — Argentina, Uruguay

== Bogdocosa ==
Bogdocosa Ponomarev & Belosludtsev, 2008

- Bogdocosa kronebergi (Andreeva, 1976) — Russia, Central Asia, Iran, China

== Brevilabus ==
Brevilabus Strand, 1908

- Brevilabus gillonorum Cornic, 1980 — Ivory Coast
- Brevilabus oryx (Simon, 1886) — Senegal, Ethiopia

== Bristowiella ==
Bristowiella Saaristo, 1980

- Bristowiella kartalensis Alderweireldt, 1988 — Comoro Islands
- Bristowiella seychellensis (Bristowe, 1973) — Seychelles, Aldabra, Comoro Islands

== Camptocosa ==
Camptocosa Dondale, Jimenez & Nieto, 2005

- Camptocosa parallela

== Caporiaccosa ==
Caporiaccosa Roewer, 1960

- Caporiaccosa arctosaeformis (Caporiacco, 1940) — Ethiopia

== Caspicosa ==
Caspicosa Ponomarev, 2007

- Caspicosa kulsaryensis Ponomarev, 2007 — Kazakhstan
- Caspicosa manytchensis Ponomarev, 2007 — Russia

== Costacosa ==
Costacosa Framenau & Leung, 2013

- Costacosa dondalei Framenau & Leung, 2013 — Western Australia
- Costacosa torbjorni Framenau & Leung, 2013 — Western Australia

== Crocodilosa ==
Crocodilosa Caporiacco, 1947

- Crocodilosa kittenbergeri Caporiacco, 1947 — East Africa
- Crocodilosa leucostigma (Simon, 1885) — India
- Crocodilosa maindroni (Simon, 1897) — India
- Crocodilosa ovicula (Thorell, 1895) — Myanmar
- Crocodilosa virulenta (O. P.-Cambridge, 1876) — Egypt

== Cynosa ==
Cynosa Caporiacco, 1933

- Cynosa agedabiae Caporiacco, 1933 — North Africa

== Dejerosa ==
Dejerosa Roewer, 1960

- Dejerosa picta Roewer, 1960 — Mozambique

== Deliriosa ==
Deliriosa Kovblyuk, 2009

- Deliriosa karadagensis Kovblyuk, 2009 — Ukraine

== Diahogna ==
Diahogna Roewer, 1960

- Diahogna exculta (L. Koch, 1876) — New South Wales, New Caledonia
- Diahogna hildegardae Framenau, 2006 — New South Wales, Victoria
- Diahogna martensi (Karsch, 1878) — New South Wales, Victoria, South Australia, Tasmania
- Diahogna pisauroides Framenau, 2006 — Northern Territory

== Diapontia ==
Diapontia Keyserling, 1876

- Diapontia niveovittata Mello-Leitao, 1945 — Argentina
- Diapontia pourtaleensis Mello-Leitao, 1944 — Argentina
- Diapontia senescens Mello-Leitao, 1944 — Argentina
- Diapontia uruguayensis Keyserling, 1877 — Brazil, Peru, Uruguay, Argentina

== Dingosa ==
Dingosa Roewer, 1955

- Dingosa humphreysi (McKay, 1985) — Southern Australia
- Dingosa liopus (Chamberlin, 1916) — Peru
- Dingosa murata Framenau & Baehr, 2007 — Southern Australia
- Dingosa serrata (L. Koch, 1877) — Southern Australia
- Dingosa simsoni (Simon, 1898) — Southern Australia, Tasmania
- Dingosa venefica (Keyserling, 1891) — Brazil

== Dolocosa ==
Dolocosa Roewer, 1960

- Dolocosa dolosa (O. P.-Cambridge, 1873) — St. Helena

== Donacosa ==
Donacosa Alderweireldt & Jocque, 1991

- Donacosa merlini Alderweireldt & Jocque, 1991 — Spain

== Dorjulopirata ==
Dorjulopirata Buchar, 1997

- Dorjulopirata dorjulanus Buchar, 1997 — Bhutan

== Draposa ==
Draposa Kronestedt, 2010

- Draposa amkhasensis (Tikader & Malhotra, 1976) — India
- Draposa atropalpis (Gravely, 1924) — India, Sri Lanka
- Draposa burasantiensis (Tikader & Malhotra, 1976) — India, China
- Draposa lyrivulva (Bösenberg & Strand, 1906) — Pakistan, India, Sri Lanka
- Draposa nicobarica (Thorell, 1891) — Nicobar Islands
- Draposa oakleyi Gravely, 1924 — Pakistan, India, Bangladesh
- Draposa porpaensis (Gajbe, 2004) — India
- Draposa subhadrae (Patel & Reddy, 1993) — India, Sri Lanka
- Draposa tenasserimensis (Thorell, 1895) — Myanmar, possibly Sumatra, Java
- Draposa zhanjiangensis (Yin et al., 1995) — China, possibly Malaysia, Sumatra, Borneo

== Edenticosa ==
Edenticosa Roewer, 1960

- Edenticosa edentula (Simon, 1910) — Bioko

== Evippa ==
Evippa Simon, 1882

- Evippa aculeata (Kroneberg, 1875) (Central Asia and Caucasus)
- Evippa aequalis Alderweireldt, 1991 (Burkina Faso, Senegal and Sudan)
- Evippa apsheronica Marusik, Guseinov & Koponen, 2003 (Azerbaijan, European Russia and Ukraine)
- Evippa arenaria (Audouin, 1826) (Sahara Desert, but likely introduced to Israel and UAE)
- Evippa badchysica Sternbergs, 1979 (southwestern Turkmenistan)
- Evippa banarensis Tikader & Malhotra, 1980 (Rajastan and likely neighbouring territories, India)
- Evippa benevola (O. Pickard-Cambridge, 1885) (Iran)
- Evippa caucasica Marusik, Guseinov & Koponen, 2003 (Azerbaijan)
- Evippa concolor (Kroneberg, 1875) (Tajikistan)
- Evippa douglasi Hogg, 1912 (China)
- Evippa eltonica Dunin, 1994 (Iran, northwestern Kazakhstan and Elton lake ,Russia)
- Evippa fortis Roewer, 1955 (Iran and likely introduced to UAE)
- Evippa jabalpurensis Gajbe, 2004 (Eastern India)
- Evippa jocquei Alderweireldt, 1991 (North Africa and likely introduced to UAE)
- Evippa kazachstanica Ponomarev, 2007 (Kazakhstan)
- Evippa kirchshoferae Roewer, 1959 (Spain and Tunisia)
- Evippa lugubris Chen, Song & Kim, 1998 (Belarus, European Russia and Ukraine)
- Evippa luteipalpis Roewer, 1955 (eastern Iran)
- Evippa massaica (Roewer, 1959) (Tanzania(?))
- Evippa nigerrima (Miller & Buchar, 1972) (Afganistan)
- Evippa onager Simon, 1895 (Xinjiang, China and very less likely Turkmenistan)
- Evippa praelongipes (O. Pickard-Cambridge, 1871) (Central Asia)
- Evippa projecta Alderweireldt, 1991 (Kenya)
- Evippa rajasthanea Tikader & Malhotra, 1980 (Rajasthan, India)
- Evippa rubiginosa Simon, 1885 (South India)
- Evippa russellsmithi Alderweireldt, 1991 (Ethiopia and Somalia)
- Evippa schenkeli Sternbergs, 1979 (southwestern Turkmenistan)
- Evippa shivajii Tikader & Malhotra, 1980
- Evippa sibirica Marusik, 1995 (from north-

eastern Kazakhstan to Tuva and Gobi-Altai Aimak in Mongolia)

- Evippa sjostedti Schenkel, 1936 (Central Asia, mostly in Mongolia)
- Evippa soderbomi Schenkel, 1936 (Mongolia and northern China)
- Evippa sohani Tikader & Malhotra, 1980 (Maharashtra, India)
- Evippa solanensis Tikader & Malhotra, 1980 (northernmost India)
- Evippa strandi (Lessert, 1926) (Congo, DRC , Rwanda and Tanzania)
- Evippa turkmenica Sternbergs, 1979 (Turkmenistan(?))

== Evippomma ==
Evippomma Roewer, 1959

- Evippomma albomarginatum Alderweireldt, 1992 — Senegal to Ethiopia
- Evippomma evippiforme (Caporiacco, 1935) — Karakorum
- Evippomma evippinum (Simon, 1897) — India
- Evippomma plumipes (Lessert, 1936) — East, Southern Africa
- Evippomma simoni Alderweireldt, 1992 — Sudan, Egypt
- Evippomma squamulatum (Simon, 1898) — Southern Africa

== Foveosa ==
Foveosa Russell-Smith, Alderweireldt & Jocque, 2007

- Foveosa adunca Russell-Smith, Alderweireldt & Jocque, 2007 — South Africa
- Foveosa albicapillis Russell-Smith, Alderweireldt & Jocque, 2007 — West Africa
- Foveosa foveolata (Purcell, 1903) — Central, East, Southern Africa
- Foveosa infuscata Russell-Smith, Alderweireldt & Jocque, 2007 — Nigeria, Ghana, Ivory Coast
- Foveosa tintinabulum Russell-Smith, Alderweireldt & Jocque, 2007 — Congo, Kenya

== Geolycosa ==
Geolycosa Montgomery, 1904

- Geolycosa aballicola (Strand, 1906) — Ethiopia
- Geolycosa albimarginata (Badcock, 1932) — Paraguay
- Geolycosa appetens Roewer, 1960 — Namibia
- Geolycosa ashantica (Strand, 1916) — Ghana
- Geolycosa atroscopulata Roewer, 1955 — Iran
- Geolycosa atrosellata Roewer, 1960 — Congo
- Geolycosa bridarollii (Mello-Leitao, 1945) — Argentina
- Geolycosa buyebalana Roewer, 1960 — Congo
- Geolycosa carli (Reimoser, 1934) — India
- Geolycosa charitonovi (Mcheidze, 1997) — Russia, Abkhazia, Georgia, Azerbaijan
- Geolycosa conspersa (Thorell, 1877) — Myanmar, Borneo, Sulawesi
- Geolycosa cyrenaica (Simon, 1908) — North Africa
- Geolycosa diffusa Roewer, 1960 — Cameroon
- Geolycosa disposita Roewer, 1960 — Angola
- Geolycosa diversa Roewer, 1960 — Rwanda
- Geolycosa domifex (Hancock, 1899) — USA, Canada
- Geolycosa dunini Zyuzin & Logunov, 2000 — Georgia, Armenia, Azerbaijan
- Geolycosa egena (L. Koch, 1877) — Queensland
- Geolycosa escambiensis Wallace, 1942 — USA
- Geolycosa excussa (Tullgren, 1905) — Bolivia, Argentina
- Geolycosa fatifera (Hentz, 1842) — USA
- Geolycosa festina (L. Koch, 1877) — Queensland
- Geolycosa flavichelis Roewer, 1955 — Iran
- Geolycosa forsaythi (Dahl, 1908) — Bismarck Archipel
- Geolycosa gaerdesi Roewer, 1960 — Namibia
- Geolycosa gofensis (Strand, 1906) — Central Africa
- Geolycosa gosoga (Chamberlin, 1925) — USA
- Geolycosa habilis Roewer, 1960 — Congo, East Africa
- Geolycosa hectoria (Pocock, 1900) — South Africa
- Geolycosa hubbelli Wallace, 1942 — USA
- Geolycosa hyltonscottae (Mello-Leitao, 1941) — Argentina
- Geolycosa iaffa (Strand, 1913) — Israel
- Geolycosa impudica (Mello-Leitao, 1944) — Argentina
- Geolycosa incertula (Mello-Leitao, 1941) — Argentina
- Geolycosa infensa (L. Koch, 1877) — Queensland, New South Wales
- Geolycosa insulata (Mello-Leitao, 1944) — Argentina
- Geolycosa ituricola (Strand, 1913) — Central Africa
- Geolycosa katekeana Roewer, 1960 — Congo
- Geolycosa kijabica (Strand, 1916) — East Africa
- Geolycosa lancearia (Mello-Leitao, 1940) — Argentina
- Geolycosa latifrons Montgomery, 1904 — USA
- Geolycosa liberiana Roewer, 1960 — Liberia
- Geolycosa lindneri (Karsch, 1879) — West, Central Africa
- Geolycosa lusingana (Roewer, 1959) — Congo
- Geolycosa micanopy Wallace, 1942 — USA
- Geolycosa minor (Simon, 1910) — Bioko
- Geolycosa missouriensis (Banks, 1895) — USA, Canada
- Geolycosa natalensis Roewer, 1960 — South Africa
- Geolycosa nolotthensis (Simon, 1910) — Namibia, South Africa
- Geolycosa nossibeensis (Strand, 1907) — Madagascar
- Geolycosa ornatipes (Bryant, 1935) — USA
- Geolycosa patellonigra Wallace, 1942 — USA
- Geolycosa pikei (Marx, 1881) — USA
- Geolycosa rafaelana (Chamberlin, 1928) — USA
- Geolycosa raptatorides (Strand, 1909) — Uruguay
- Geolycosa riograndae Wallace, 1942 — USA
- Geolycosa rogersi Wallace, 1942 — USA
- Geolycosa rubrotaeniata (Keyserling, 1877) — Colombia
- Geolycosa rufibarbis (Mello-Leitao, 1947) — Brazil
- Geolycosa sangilia (Roewer, 1955) — Colombia
- Geolycosa schulzi (Dahl, 1908) — Bismarck Archipel
- Geolycosa sexmaculata Roewer, 1960 — Afghanistan
- Geolycosa shinkuluna Roewer, 1960 — Congo
- Geolycosa suahela (Strand, 1913) — Central, East Africa
- Geolycosa subvittata (Pocock, 1900) — South Africa
- Geolycosa tangana (Roewer, 1959) — Tanzania
- Geolycosa ternetzi (Mello-Leitao, 1939) — Paraguay
- Geolycosa timorensis (Thorell, 1881) — Timor
- Geolycosa togonia Roewer, 1960 — Togo
- Geolycosa turricola (Treat, 1880) — USA
- Geolycosa uinticolens (Chamberlin, 1936) — USA
- Geolycosa urbana (O. P.-Cambridge, 1876) — North, Central Africa to India
  - Geolycosa urbana hova (Strand, 1907) — Madagascar
- Geolycosa uruguayaca (Strand, 1909) — Uruguay
- Geolycosa vultuosa (C. L. Koch, 1838) — Southeastern Europe to Central Asia
- Geolycosa wrighti (Emerton, 1912) — USA, Canada
- Geolycosa xera McCrone, 1963 — USA
  - Geolycosa xera archboldi McCrone, 1963 — USA

== Gladicosa ==
Gladicosa Brady, 1987

- Gladicosa bellamyi (Gertsch & Wallace, 1937) — USA
- Gladicosa euepigynata (Montgomery, 1904) — USA
- Gladicosa gulosa (Walckenaer, 1837) — USA, Canada
- Gladicosa huberti (Chamberlin, 1924) — USA
- Gladicosa pulchra (Keyserling, 1877) — USA

== Gnatholycosa ==
Gnatholycosa Mello-Leitao, 1940

- Gnatholycosa spinipalpis Mello-Leitao, 1940 — Argentina

== Hesperocosa ==
Hesperocosa Gertsch & Wallace, 1937

- Hesperocosa unica (Gertsch & Wallace, 1935) — USA

== Hippasa ==
Hippasa Simon, 1885

- Hippasa affinis Lessert, 1933 — Angola
- Hippasa afghana Roewer, 1960 — Afghanistan
- Hippasa agelenoides (Simon, 1884) — India to Taiwan
- Hippasa albopunctata Thorell, 1899 — Cameroon, Ivory Coast
- Hippasa australis Lawrence, 1927 — Southern Africa
- Hippasa babai Tanikawa, 2007 — Japan
- Hippasa bifasciata Buchar, 1997 — Bhutan
- Hippasa brechti Alderweireldt & Jocque, 2005 — Ivory Coast, Togo
- Hippasa charamaensis Gajbe, 2004 — India
- Hippasa cinerea Simon, 1898 — Africa
- Hippasa decemnotata Simon, 1910 — West Africa
- Hippasa elienae Alderweireldt & Jocque, 2005 — Tanzania
- Hippasa fabreae Gajbe & Gajbe, 1999 — India
- Hippasa flavicoma Caporiacco, 1935 — Karakorum
- Hippasa funerea Lessert, 1925 — Southern Africa
- Hippasa greenalliae (Blackwall, 1867) — India, Bangladesh, Sri Lanka, China
- Hippasa hansae Gajbe & Gajbe, 1999 — India
- Hippasa haryanensis Arora & Monga, 1994 — India
- Hippasa himalayensis Gravely, 1924 — India
- Hippasa holmerae Thorell, 1895 — India to Philippines
  - Hippasa holmerae sundaica Thorell, 1895 — Singapore
- Hippasa innesi Simon, 1889 — Egypt
- Hippasa lamtoensis Dresco, 1981 — Ivory Coast
- Hippasa loeffleri (Roewer, 1955) — Iran
- Hippasa loundesi Gravely, 1924 — India
- Hippasa lycosina Pocock, 1900 — India, China, Laos
- Hippasa madhuae Tikader & Malhotra, 1980 — India
- Hippasa madraspatana Gravely, 1924 — India
- Hippasa marginata Roewer, 1960 — Cameroon
- Hippasa olivacea (Thorell, 1887) — Myanmar, India
- Hippasa partita (O. P.-Cambridge, 1876) — Egypt to India, Central Asia
- Hippasa pisaurina Pocock, 1900 — Iraq, India, Pakistan, Bangladesh
- Hippasa simoni (Thorell, 1887) — Myanmar
- Hippasa sinai Alderweireldt & Jocque, 2005 — Egypt, Saudi Arabia
- Hippasa valiveruensis Patel & Reddy, 1993 — India
- Hippasa wigglesworthi Gajbe & Gajbe, 1999 — India

== Hippasella ==
Hippasella Mello-Leitao, 1944

- Hippasella alhue Piacentini, 2011 — Argentina
- Hippasella arapensis (Strand, 1908) — Peru
- Hippasella guaquiensis (Strand, 1908) — Peru, Bolivia, Argentina

== Hoggicosa ==
Hoggicosa Roewer, 1960

- Hoggicosa alfi Langlands & Framenau, 2010 — Australia
- Hoggicosa bicolor (Hogg, 1905) — Australia
- Hoggicosa brennani Langlands & Framenau, 2010 — Queensland, New South Wales, South Australia
- Hoggicosa castanea (Hogg, 1905) — Australia
- Hoggicosa duracki (McKay, 1975) — Western Australia
- Hoggicosa forresti (McKay, 1973) — Western Australia, South Australia
- Hoggicosa natashae Langlands & Framenau, 2010 — Queensland, New South Wales, South Australia
- Hoggicosa snelli (McKay, 1975) — Western Australia
- Hoggicosa storri (McKay, 1973) — Western Australia
- Hoggicosa wolodymyri Langlands & Framenau, 2010 — Australia

== Hogna ==
Hogna Simon, 1885

- Hogna adjacens Roewer, 1959 — Southern Africa
- Hogna afghana (Roewer, 1960) — Afghanistan
- Hogna agadira (Roewer, 1960) — Morocco
- Hogna albemarlensis (Banks, 1902) — Galapagos Islands
- Hogna alexandria (Roewer, 1960) — Egypt
- Hogna alticeps (Kroneberg, 1875) — Central Asia
- Hogna ammophila (Wallace, 1942) — USA
- Hogna andreinii Reimoser, 1937 — Ethiopia
- Hogna angusta (Tullgren, 1901) — USA
- Hogna antelucana (Montgomery, 1904) — USA
- Hogna antiguiana Roewer, 1955 — Antigua
- Hogna archaeologica (Chamberlin, 1925) — Mexico
- Hogna argentinensis (Mello-Leitao, 1941) — Argentina
- Hogna atramentata (Karsch, 1879) — Central, East Africa
- Hogna auricoma (Keyserling, 1891) — Brazil
- Hogna badia (Keyserling, 1877) — Cuba, Central America
- Hogna balearica (Thorell, 1873) — Balearic Islands
- Hogna baliana Roewer, 1959 — Cameroon
- Hogna baltimoriana (Keyserling, 1877) — USA, Canada
- Hogna bellatrix (L. Koch, 1865) — Australia
- Hogna beniana (Strand, 1913) — Central, East Africa
- Hogna bergsoei (Thorell, 1875) — Russia, Central Asia
- Hogna bhougavia Roewer, 1960 — Afghanistan
- Hogna bicoloripes (Roewer, 1960) — Cameroon
- Hogna bimaculata (Purcell, 1903) — South Africa
- Hogna biscoitoi Wunderlich, 1992 — Madeira
- Hogna bivittata (Mello-Leitao, 1939) — Argentina
- Hogna bonifacioi Barrion & Litsinger, 1995 — Philippines
- Hogna bottegoi Caporiacco, 1940 — Ethiopia
- Hogna bowonglangi (Merian, 1911) — Sulawesi
- Hogna brevitarsis (F. O. P.-Cambridge, 1902) — Mexico to Panama
- Hogna brunnea (Bösenberg, 1895) — Canary Islands
- Hogna bruta (Karsch, 1880) — Polynesia
- Hogna burti (Hickman, 1944) — South Australia
- Hogna canariana (Roewer, 1960) — Canary Islands
- Hogna carolinensis (Walckenaer, 1805) — USA, Mexico
- Hogna chickeringi (Chamberlin & Ivie, 1936) — Panama
- Hogna cinica (Tongiorgi, 1977) — St. Helena
- Hogna coloradensis (Banks, 1894) — USA, Mexico
- Hogna colosii (Caporiacco, 1947) — Guyana
- Hogna commota (Gertsch, 1934) — Colombia
- Hogna conspersa (L. Koch, 1882) — Balearic Islands
- Hogna constricta (F. O. P.-Cambridge, 1902) — Guatemala
- Hogna cosquin (Mello-Leitao, 1941) — Argentina
- Hogna crispipes (L. Koch, 1877) — Australia, New Guinea, New Hebrides, Polynesia, New Zealand, Norfolk Islands
- Hogna dauana Roewer, 1959 — Ethiopia
- Hogna defucata Roewer, 1959 — Congo
- Hogna denisi Roewer, 1959 — South Africa
- Hogna deweti Roewer, 1959 — South Africa
- Hogna diyari Framenau, Gotch & Austin, 2006 — Queensland, New South Wales, South Australia
- Hogna duala Roewer, 1959 — Cameroon
- Hogna efformata Roewer, 1959 — Namibia
- Hogna electa Roewer, 1959 — Tanzania
- Hogna enecens Roewer, 1959 — Kenya
- Hogna ericeticola (Wallace, 1942) — USA
- Hogna espanola Baert & Maelfait, 2008 — Galapagos Islands
- Hogna estrix Roewer, 1959 — Namibia
- Hogna etoshana Roewer, 1959 — Namibia
- Hogna exigua (Roewer, 1960) — Namibia
- Hogna exsiccatella (Strand, 1916) — Guatemala
- Hogna felina (L. Koch, 1878) — Azerbaijan
- Hogna ferocella (Strand, 1916) — Canary Islands
- Hogna ferox (Lucas, 1838) — Canary Islands, Mediterranean
- Hogna filicum (Karsch, 1880) — Polynesia
- Hogna flava Roewer, 1959 — Namibia
- Hogna forsteri Caporiacco, 1955 — Venezuela
- Hogna fraissei (L. Koch, 1882) — Mallorca
- Hogna frondicola (Emerton, 1885) — USA, Canada
- Hogna furva (Thorell, 1899) — Cameroon, Sierra Leone, Bioko
  - Hogna furva cingulipes (Simon, 1910) — Annobon Islands
- Hogna furvescens (Simon, 1910) — Botswana
- Hogna gabonensis Roewer, 1959 — Gabon
- Hogna galapagoensis (Banks, 1902) — Galapagos Islands
- Hogna graeca (Roewer, 1951) — Greece
- Hogna gratiosa Roewer, 1959 — Zanzibar
- Hogna grazianii (Caporiacco, 1939) — Ethiopia
- Hogna gumia (Petrunkevitch, 1911) — Bolivia
- Hogna guttatula (F. O. P.-Cambridge, 1902) — Mexico
- Hogna hawaiiensis (Simon, 1899) — Hawaii
- Hogna heeri (Thorell, 1875) — Madeira
- Hogna hendrickxi Baert & Maelfait, 2008 — Galapagos Islands
- Hogna hereroana (Roewer, 1960) — Namibia
- Hogna hibernalis (Strand, 1906) — Ethiopia
- Hogna hickmani Caporiacco, 1955 — Venezuela
- Hogna himalayensis (Gravely, 1924) — India, Bhutan, China
- Hogna hippasimorpha (Strand, 1913) — Central Africa
- Hogna idonea Roewer, 1959 — South Africa
- Hogna immansueta (Simon, 1909) — Western Australia
- Hogna indefinida (Mello-Leitao, 1941) — Argentina
- Hogna inexorabilis (O. P.-Cambridge, 1869) — St. Helena
- Hogna infulata Roewer, 1959 — South Africa
- Hogna ingens (Blackwall, 1857) — Madeira
- Hogna inhambania Roewer, 1955 — Mozambique
- Hogna inominata (Simon, 1886) — Thailand
- Hogna inops (Thorell, 1890) — Sumatra, Borneo, Sulawesi
- Hogna insulana (L. Koch, 1882) — Mallorca
- Hogna insularum (Kulczynski, 1899) — Madeira
- Hogna interrita Roewer, 1959 — Zimbabwe
- Hogna irascibilis (O. P.-Cambridge, 1885) — Turkmenistan
- Hogna irumua (Strand, 1913) — Central Africa
- Hogna jacquesbreli Baert & Maelfait, 2008 — Galapagos Islands
- Hogna jiafui Peng et al., 1997 — China
- Hogna juanensis (Strand, 1907) — Mozambique
- Hogna junco Baert & Maelfait, 2008 — Galapagos Islands
- Hogna kabwea Roewer, 1959 — Congo
- Hogna kankunda Roewer, 1959 — Congo
- Hogna karschi (Roewer, 1951) — Sao Tome
- Hogna kuyani Framenau, Gotch & Austin, 2006 — Australia
- Hogna labrea (Chamberlin & Ivie, 1942) — USA
- Hogna lacertosa (L. Koch, 1877) — South Australia
- Hogna lambarenensis (Simon, 1910) — Congo
- Hogna landanae (Simon, 1877) — West Africa, Angola
- Hogna landanella Roewer, 1959 — Angola
- Hogna lawrencei (Roewer, 1960) — South Africa
- Hogna lenta (Hentz, 1844) — USA
- Hogna leprieuri (Simon, 1876) — Algeria
- Hogna leucocephala (L. Koch, 1879) — Russia
- Hogna levis (Karsch, 1879) — West, Central Africa
- Hogna liberiaca Roewer, 1959 — Liberia
- Hogna ligata (O. P.-Cambridge, 1869) — St. Helena
- Hogna likelikeae (Simon, 1900) — Hawaii
- Hogna litigiosa Roewer, 1959 — Angola
- Hogna longitarsis (F. O. P.-Cambridge, 1902) — Mexico, Costa Rica, Panama
- Hogna luctuosa (Mello-Leitao, 1947) — Brazil
- Hogna luederitzi (Simon, 1910) — Namibia, South Africa
- Hogna lufirana (Roewer, 1960) — Congo
- Hogna lupina (Karsch, 1879) — Sri Lanka
- Hogna maasi (Gertsch & Wallace, 1937) — Mexico
- Hogna mabwensis Roewer, 1959 — Congo
- Hogna maderiana (Walckenaer, 1837) — Madeira
- Hogna magnosepta (Guy, 1966) — Morocco
- Hogna maheana Roewer, 1959 — Seychelles
- Hogna manicola (Strand, 1906) — Ethiopia
- Hogna maroccana (Roewer, 1960) — Morocco
- Hogna maruana (Roewer, 1960) — Cameroon
- Hogna massaiensis (Roewer, 1960) — Tanzania
- Hogna massauana Roewer, 1959 — Ethiopia
- Hogna maurusia (Simon, 1909) — Morocco
- Hogna medellina (Strand, 1914) — Colombia
- Hogna medica (Pocock, 1889) — Iran
- Hogna miami (Wallace, 1942) — USA
- Hogna migdilybs (Simon, 1886) — Senegal
- Hogna morosina (Banks, 1909) — Costa Rica
- Hogna munoiensis Roewer, 1959 — Congo
- Hogna nairobia (Roewer, 1960) — Kenya
- Hogna nefasta Tongiorgi, 1977 — St. Helena
- Hogna nervosa (Keyserling, 1891) — Brazil
- Hogna nigerrima (Roewer, 1960) — Tanzania
- Hogna nigrichelis (Roewer, 1955) — Iran
- Hogna nigrosecta (Mello-Leitao, 1940) — Argentina
- Hogna nimia Roewer, 1959 — Tanzania
- Hogna nonannulata Wunderlich, 1995 — Madeira
- Hogna nychthemera (Bertkau, 1880) — Brazil
- Hogna oaxacana (Gertsch & Wallace, 1937) — Mexico
- Hogna ocellata (L. Koch, 1878) — Azerbaijan
- Hogna ocyalina (Simon, 1910) — Namibia
- Hogna optabilis Roewer, 1959 — Congo
- Hogna ornata (Perty, 1833) — Brazil
- Hogna osceola (Gertsch & Wallace, 1937) — USA
- Hogna otaviensis (Roewer, 1960) — Namibia
- Hogna pardalina (Bertkau, 1880) — Brazil
- Hogna parvagenitalia (Guy, 1966) — Canary Islands
- Hogna patens Roewer, 1959 — Zimbabwe
- Hogna patricki (Purcell, 1903) — Southern Africa
- Hogna pauciguttata Roewer, 1959 — Mozambique
- Hogna persimilis (Banks, 1898) — Mexico
- Hogna perspicua Roewer, 1959 — Ethiopia
- Hogna petersi (Karsch, 1878) — Mozambique
- Hogna petiti (Simon, 1876) — Congo
- Hogna placata Roewer, 1959 — Lesotho
- Hogna planithoracis (Mello-Leitao, 1938) — Argentina
- Hogna posticata (Banks, 1904) — USA
- Hogna principum (Simon, 1910) — Principe
- Hogna propria Roewer, 1959 — Tanzania
- Hogna proterva Roewer, 1959 — Congo
- Hogna pseudoceratiola (Wallace, 1942) — USA
- Hogna pseudoradiata (Guy, 1966) — possibly Morocco
- Hogna pulchella (Keyserling, 1877) — Colombia
- Hogna pulla (Bösenberg & Lenz, 1895) — East Africa
- Hogna pulloides (Strand, 1908) — Ethiopia
- Hogna radiata (Latreille, 1817) — Central Europe to Central Asia, Central Africa
  - Hogna radiata clara (Franganillo, 1913) — Spain
  - Hogna radiata minor (Simon, 1876) — Mediterranean
- Hogna raffrayi (Simon, 1876) — East Africa, Zanzibar
- Hogna reducta (Bryant, 1942) — Virgin Islands
- Hogna reimoseri Roewer, 1959 — Ethiopia
- Hogna rizali Barrion & Litsinger, 1995 — Philippines
- Hogna rubetra (Schenkel, 1963) — China
- Hogna rubromandibulata (O. P.-Cambridge, 1885) — Yarkand, Karakorum
- Hogna rufimanoides (Strand, 1908) — Peru, Bolivia
- Hogna ruricolaris (Simon, 1910) — Botswana
- Hogna sanctithomasi (Petrunkevitch, 1926) — St. Thomas
- Hogna sanctivincentii (Simon, 1897) — Virgin Islands, St. Vincent
- Hogna sanisabel (Strand, 1909) — Uruguay
- Hogna sansibarensis (Strand, 1907) — Zanzibar
- Hogna schmitzi Wunderlich, 1992 — Madeira
- Hogna schreineri (Purcell, 1903) — Namibia, South Africa
- Hogna schultzei (Simon, 1910) — Namibia
- Hogna senilis (L. Koch, 1877) — New South Wales
- Hogna simoni Roewer, 1959 — Cameroon, Congo, Angola
- Hogna simplex (L. Koch, 1882) — Mallorca
- Hogna sinaia Roewer, 1959 — Egypt
- Hogna snodgrassi Banks, 1902 — Galapagos Islands
- Hogna spenceri (Pocock, 1898) — Rwanda, South Africa
- Hogna sternalis (Bertkau, 1880) — Brazil
- Hogna stictopyga (Thorell, 1895) — India, Myanmar, Singapore
- Hogna straeleni Roewer, 1959 — Congo, Rwanda, Tanzania
- Hogna subaustralis (Strand, 1908) — Peru
- Hogna subligata (L. Koch, 1877) — Queensland
- Hogna subrufa (Karsch, 1878) — Tasmania
- Hogna subtilis (Bryant, 1942) — Virgin Islands
- Hogna suprenans (Chamberlin, 1924) — USA
- Hogna swakopmundensis (Strand, 1916) — Namibia
- Hogna tantilla (Bryant, 1948) — Hispaniola
- Hogna ternetzi (Mello-Leitao, 1939) — Paraguay
- Hogna teteana Roewer, 1959 — Mozambique
- Hogna thetis (Simon, 1910) — Principe
- Hogna tigana (Gertsch & Wallace, 1935) — USA
- Hogna timuqua (Wallace, 1942) — USA
- Hogna tivior (Chamberlin & Ivie, 1936) — Panama
- Hogna tlaxcalana (Gertsch & Davis, 1940) — Mexico
- Hogna transvaalica (Simon, 1898) — South Africa
- Hogna travassosi (Mello-Leitao, 1939) — Brazil
- Hogna truculenta (O. P.-Cambridge, 1876) — Egypt
- Hogna trunca Yin, Bao & Zhang, 1996 — China
- Hogna unicolor Roewer, 1959 — Mozambique
- Hogna vachoni Caporiacco, 1954 — French Guiana
- Hogna variolosa (Mello-Leitao, 1941) — Argentina
- Hogna ventrilineata Caporiacco, 1954 — French Guiana
- Hogna volxemi (Bertkau, 1880) — Brazil
- Hogna vulpina (C. L. Koch, 1847) — Brazil
- Hogna wallacei (Chamberlin & Ivie, 1944) — USA
- Hogna watsoni (Gertsch, 1934) — USA
- Hogna willeyi (Pocock, 1899) — Bismarck Archipel
- Hogna yauliensis (Strand, 1908) — Peru
- Hogna zorodes (Mello-Leitao, 1942) — Argentina
- Hogna zuluana Roewer, 1959 — South Africa

== Hognoides ==
Hognoides Roewer, 1960

- Hognoides ukrewea Roewer, 1960 — Tanzania
- Hognoides urbanides (Strand, 1907) — Madagascar

== Hyaenosa ==
Hyaenosa Caporiacco, 1940

- Hyaenosa clarki (Hogg, 1912) — China
- Hyaenosa effera (O. P.-Cambridge, 1872) — North Africa, Israel, Lebanon
- Hyaenosa invasa Savelyeva, 1972 — Central Asia
- Hyaenosa ruandana Roewer, 1960 — Rwanda
- Hyaenosa strandi Caporiacco, 1940 — Ethiopia

== Hygrolycosa ==
Hygrolycosa Dahl, 1908

- Hygrolycosa alpigena Yu & Song, 1988 — China
- Hygrolycosa rubrofasciata (Ohlert, 1865) — Palearctic
- Hygrolycosa strandi Caporiacco, 1948 — Greece
- Hygrolycosa umidicola Tanaka, 1978 — Japan

== Karakumosa ==
Karakumosa Logunov & Ponomarev, 2020

- Karakumosa alticeps (Kroneberg, 1875) – Kazakhstan
- Karakumosa badkhyzica Logunov & Ponomarev, 2020 – Turkmenistan
- Karakumosa gromovi Logunov & Ponomarev, 2020 – Uzbekistan
- Karakumosa medica (Pocock, 1889) – Afghanistan
- Karakumosa repetek Logunov & Ponomarev, 2020 (type) – Turkmenistan
- Karakumosa reshetnikovi Logunov & Fomichev, 2021 – Tajikistan
- Karakumosa shmatkoi Logunov & Ponomarev, 2020 – Azerbaijan, Russia (Europe), Kazakhstan
- Karakumosa tashkumyr Logunov & Ponomarev, 2020 – Kyrgyzstan
- Karakumosa turanica Logunov & Ponomarev, 2020 – Turkmenistan
- Karakumosa zyuzini Logunov & Ponomarev, 2020 – Uzbekistan

== Kangarosa ==
Kangarosa Framenau, 2010

- Kangarosa alboguttulata (L. Koch, 1878) — Queensland, New South Wales
- Kangarosa focarius Framenau, 2010 — Victoria
- Kangarosa ludwigi Framenau, 2010 — Queensland, New South Wales
- Kangarosa nothofagus Framenau, 2010 — Victoria
- Kangarosa ossea Framenau, 2010 — Queensland
- Kangarosa pandura Framenau, 2010 — New South Wales, Australian Capital Territory, Victoria
- Kangarosa properipes (Simon, 1909) — Western Australia
- Kangarosa tasmaniensis Framenau, 2010 — Tasmania
- Kangarosa tristicula (L. Koch, 1877) — Queensland, New South Wales
- Kangarosa yannicki Framenau, 2010 — New South Wales

== Katableps ==
Katableps Jocque, Russell-Smith & Alderweireldt, 2011

- Katableps masoala Jocque, Russell-Smith & Alderweireldt, 2011 — Madagascar
- Katableps perinet Jocque, Russell-Smith & Alderweireldt, 2011 — Madagascar
- Katableps pudicus Jocque, Russell-Smith & Alderweireldt, 2011 — Madagascar

== Knoelle ==
Knoelle Framenau, 2006

- Knoelle clara (L. Koch, 1877) — Australia

== Kuncosa ==
- Kuncosa fujiii (Tanaka, 1985) – Japan
- Kuncosa hikosanensis (Tanaka, 1985) – Japan
- Kuncosa kwangreungensis (Paik & Tanaka, 1986) – Korea
- Kuncosa ningboensis (Yin, Bao & Zhang, 1996) – China
- Kuncosa zhui (Yu & Song, 1988) – China

== Lobizon ==
Lobizon Piacentini & Grismado, 2009

- Lobizon corondaensis (Mello-Leitao, 1941) — Argentina
- Lobizon humilis (Mello-Leitao, 1944) — Argentina
- Lobizon minor (Mello-Leitao, 1941) — Argentina
- Lobizon ojangureni Piacentini & Grismado, 2009 — Argentina
- Lobizon otamendi Piacentini & Grismado, 2009 — Argentina

== Loculla ==
Loculla Simon, 1910

- Loculla austrocaspia Roewer, 1955 — Iran
- Loculla massaica Roewer, 1960 — Tanzania
- Loculla rauca Simon, 1910 — Sao Tome
  - Loculla rauca minor Simon, 1910 — Sao Tome
- Loculla senzea Roewer, 1960 — Congo

== Lycosa ==
Lycosa Latreille, 1804

- Lycosa abnormis Guy, 1966 — North Africa
- Lycosa accurata (Becker, 1886) — Mexico
- Lycosa adusta Banks, 1898 — Mexico
- Lycosa affinis Lucas, 1846 — Algeria
- Lycosa anclata Franganillo, 1946 — Cuba
- Lycosa apacha Chamberlin, 1925 — USA
- Lycosa approximata (O. P.-Cambridge, 1885) — Yarkand
- Lycosa aragogi Nadolny & Zamani, 2017 — Iran
- Lycosa arambagensis Biswas & Biswas, 1992 — India
- Lycosa ariadnae McKay, 1979 — Western Australia
- Lycosa articulata Costa, 1875 — Israel
- Lycosa artigasi Casanueva, 1980 — Chile
- Lycosa asiatica Sytshevskaja, 1980 — Tajikistan
- Lycosa aurea Hogg, 1896 — Central Australia
- Lycosa auroguttata (Keyserling, 1891) — Brazil
- Lycosa australicola (Strand, 1913) — Western Australia, Northern Territory
- Lycosa australis Simon, 1884 — Chile
- Lycosa balaramai Patel & Reddy, 1993 — India
- Lycosa barnesi Gravely, 1924 — India
- Lycosa baulnyi Simon, 1876 — North Africa
- Lycosa bedeli Simon, 1876 — North Africa
- Lycosa beihaiensis Yin, Bao & Zhang, 1995 — China
- Lycosa bezzii Mello-Leitao, 1944 — Argentina
- Lycosa bhatnagari Sadana, 1969 — India
- Lycosa biolleyi Banks, 1909 — Costa Rica
- Lycosa bistriata Gravely, 1924 — India, Bhutan
- Lycosa boninensis Tanaka, 1989 — Taiwan, Japan
- Lycosa bonneti Guy & Carricaburu, 1967 — Algeria
- Lycosa brunnea F. O. P.-Cambridge, 1902 — Costa Rica, Guatemala, Mexico
- Lycosa caenosa Rainbow, 1899 — New Caledonia, New Hebrides
- Lycosa canescens Schenkel, 1963 — China
- Lycosa capensis Simon, 1898 — South Africa
- Lycosa carbonelli Costa & Capocasale, 1984 — Uruguay
- Lycosa carmichaeli Gravely, 1924 — India
- Lycosa cerrofloresiana Petrunkevitch, 1925 — El Salvador to Panama
- Lycosa chaperi Simon, 1885 — India, Pakistan
- Lycosa choudhuryi Tikader & Malhotra, 1980 — India, China
- Lycosa cingara (C. L. Koch, 1847) — Egypt
- Lycosa clarissa Roewer, 1951 — Spain
- Lycosa coelestis L. Koch, 1878 — China, Korea, Japan
- Lycosa connexa Roewer, 1960 — South Africa
- Lycosa contestata Montgomery, 1903 — USA
- Lycosa corallina McKay, 1974 — Australia
- Lycosa coreana Paik, 1994 — Korea
- Lycosa cowlei Hogg, 1896 — Central Australia
- Lycosa cretacea Simon, 1898 — North Africa
- Lycosa dacica (Pavesi, 1898) — Romania
- Lycosa danjiangensis Yin, Zhao & Bao, 1997 — China
- Lycosa dilatata F. O. P.-Cambridge, 1902 — Mexico to El Salvador
- Lycosa dimota Simon, 1909 — Western Australia
- Lycosa discolor Walckenaer, 1837 — USA
- Lycosa elysae Tongiorgi, 1977 — St. Helena
- Lycosa emuncta Banks, 1898 — Mexico
- Lycosa erjianensis Yin & Zhao, 1996 — China
- Lycosa erythrognatha Lucas, 1836 — Brazil, Uruguay, Paraguay, Argentina
- Lycosa eutypa Chamberlin, 1925 — Panama
- Lycosa falconensis Schenkel, 1953 — Venezuela
- Lycosa fasciiventris Dufour, 1835 — Spain, Morocco
- Lycosa fernandezi (F. O. P.-Cambridge, 1899) — Juan Fernandez Islands
- Lycosa ferriculosa Chamberlin, 1919 — USA
- Lycosa formosana Saito, 1936 — Taiwan
- Lycosa frigens (Kulczynski, 1916) — Russia
- Lycosa fuscana Pocock, 1901 — India
- Lycosa futilis Banks, 1898 — Mexico
- Lycosa geotubalis Tikader & Malhotra, 1980 — India
- Lycosa gibsoni McKay, 1979 — Western Australia
- Lycosa gigantea (Roewer, 1960) — South Africa
- Lycosa gilberta Hogg, 1905 — New South Wales, Victoria, South Australia
- Lycosa gobiensis Schenkel, 1936 — Mongolia, China
- Lycosa godeffroyi L. Koch, 1865 — Australia
- Lycosa goliathus Pocock, 1901 — India
- Lycosa grahami Fox, 1935 — China
- Lycosa guayaquiliana Mello-Leitao, 1939 — Ecuador
- Lycosa hickmani (Roewer, 1955) — New Guinea, Northern Australia
- Lycosa hildegardae Casanueva, 1980 — Chile
- Lycosa hispanica (Walckenaer, 1837) — Spain
  - Lycosa hispanica dufouri (Strand, 1916) — Spain
- Lycosa horrida (Keyserling, 1877) — Colombia
- Lycosa howarthi Gertsch, 1973 — Hawaii
- Lycosa illicita Gertsch, 1934 — Mexico
- Lycosa immanis L. Koch, 1879 — Russia
- Lycosa impavida Walckenaer, 1837 — USA
- Lycosa implacida Nicolet, 1849 — Chile
- Lycosa indagatrix Walckenaer, 1837 — India, Sri Lanka
- Lycosa indomita Nicolet, 1849 — Chile
- Lycosa infesta Walckenaer, 1837 — USA
- Lycosa injusta Banks, 1898 — Mexico
- Lycosa innocua Doleschall, 1859 — Amboina
- Lycosa inornata Blackwall, 1862 — Brazil
- Lycosa insulana (Bryant, 1923) — Barbados
- Lycosa insularis Lucas, 1857 — Cuba
- Lycosa intermedialis Roewer, 1955 — Libya
- Lycosa interstitialis (Strand, 1906) — Algeria
- Lycosa inviolata Roewer, 1960 — South Africa
- Lycosa iranii Pocock, 1901 — India
- Lycosa ishikariana (Saito, 1934) — Russia, Japan
- Lycosa isolata Bryant, 1940 — Cuba
- Lycosa jagadalpurensis Gajbe, 2004 — India
- Lycosa kempi Gravely, 1924 — India, Pakistan, Bhutan, China
- Lycosa koyuga McKay, 1979 — Western Australia
- Lycosa labialis Mao & Song, 1985 — China, Korea
- Lycosa labialisoides Peng et al., 1997 — China
- Lycosa laeta L. Koch, 1877 — Eastern Australia
- Lycosa lambai Tikader & Malhotra, 1980 — India
- Lycosa langei Mello-Leitao, 1947 — Brazil
- Lycosa lativulva F. O. P.-Cambridge, 1902 — Guatemala
- Lycosa lebakensis Doleschall, 1859 — Java
- Lycosa leuckarti (Thorell, 1870) — Australia
- Lycosa leucogastra Mello-Leitao, 1944 — Argentina
- Lycosa leucophaeoides (Roewer, 1951) — Queensland
- Lycosa leucophthalma Mello-Leitao, 1940 — Argentina
- Lycosa leucotaeniata (Mello-Leitao, 1947) — Brazil
- Lycosa liliputana Nicolet, 1849 — Chile
- Lycosa longivulva F. O. P.-Cambridge, 1902 — Guatemala
- Lycosa macedonica (Giltay, 1932) — Macedonia
- Lycosa mackenziei Gravely, 1924 — Pakistan, India, Bangladesh
- Lycosa maculata Butt, Anwar & Tahir, 2006 — Pakistan
- Lycosa madagascariensis Vinson, 1863 — Madagascar
- Lycosa madani Pocock, 1901 — India
- Lycosa magallanica Karsch, 1880 — Chile
- Lycosa magnifica Hu, 2001 — China
- Lycosa mahabaleshwarensis Tikader & Malhotra, 1980 — India
- Lycosa masteri Pocock, 1901 — India
- Lycosa matusitai Nakatsudi, 1943 — Japan to Micronesia
- Lycosa maya Chamberlin, 1925 — Mexico
- Lycosa mexicana Banks, 1898 — Mexico
- Lycosa minae (Dönitz & Strand, 1906) — Japan
- Lycosa molyneuxi Hogg, 1905 — New South Wales
- Lycosa mordax Walckenaer, 1837 — USA
- Lycosa moulmeinensis Gravely, 1924 — Myanmar
- Lycosa mukana Roewer, 1960 — Congo
- Lycosa munieri Simon, 1876 — North Africa
- Lycosa muntea (Roewer, 1960) — Congo
- Lycosa musgravei McKay, 1974 — New South Wales, Victoria
- Lycosa niceforoi Mello-Leitao, 1941 — Colombia
- Lycosa nigricans Butt, Anwar & Tahir, 2006 — Pakistan
- Lycosa nigromarmorata Mello-Leitao, 1941 — Colombia
- Lycosa nigropunctata Rainbow, 1915 — South Australia
- Lycosa nigrotaeniata Mello-Leitao, 1941 — Colombia
- Lycosa nigrotibialis Simon, 1884 — India, Bhutan, Myanmar
- Lycosa nilotica Audouin, 1826 — Egypt
- Lycosa nordenskjoldi Tullgren, 1905 — Brazil, Bolivia
- Lycosa oculata Simon, 1876 — Western Mediterranean
- Lycosa ovalata Franganillo, 1930 — Cuba
- Lycosa pachana Pocock, 1898 — Central, Southern Africa
- Lycosa palliata Roewer, 1960 — South Africa
- Lycosa pampeana Holmberg, 1876 — Paraguay, Argentina
- Lycosa paranensis Holmberg, 1876 — Brazil, Argentina
- Lycosa parvipudens Karsch, 1881 — Gilbert Islands
- Lycosa patagonica Simon, 1886 — Chile
- Lycosa pavlovi Schenkel, 1953 — China
- Lycosa perkinsi Simon, 1904 — Hawaii
- Lycosa perspicua Roewer, 1960 — South Africa
- Lycosa philadelphiana Walckenaer, 1837 — USA
- Lycosa phipsoni Pocock, 1899 — India to China, Taiwan
  - Lycosa phipsoni leucophora (Thorell, 1887) — Myanmar
- Lycosa pia (Bösenberg & Strand, 1906) — Japan
- Lycosa pictipes (Keyserling, 1891) — Brazil, Argentina
- Lycosa pictula Pocock, 1901 — India
- Lycosa pintoi Mello-Leitao, 1931 — Brazil
- Lycosa piochardi Simon, 1876 — Syria
  - Lycosa piochardi infraclara (Strand, 1915) — Israel
- Lycosa poliostoma (C. L. Koch, 1847) — Brazil, Paraguay, Uruguay, Argentina
- Lycosa poonaensis Tikader & Malhotra, 1980 — India
- Lycosa porteri Simon, 1904 — Chile
- Lycosa praegrandis C. L. Koch, 1836 — Greece to Central Asia
  - Lycosa praegrandis discoloriventer Caporiacco, 1949 — Albania
- Lycosa praestans Roewer, 1960 — Botswana
- Lycosa proletarioides Mello-Leitao, 1941 — Argentina
- Lycosa prolifica Pocock, 1901 — India
- Lycosa pulchella (Thorell, 1881) — New Guinea, Bismarck Archipel
- Lycosa punctiventralis (Roewer, 1951) — Mexico
- Lycosa quadrimaculata Lucas, 1858 — Gabon
- Lycosa rimicola Purcell, 1903 — South Africa
- Lycosa ringens Tongiorgi, 1977 — St. Helena
- Lycosa rostrata Franganillo, 1930 — Cuba
- Lycosa rufisterna Schenkel, 1953 — China
- Lycosa russea Schenkel, 1953 — China
- Lycosa sabulosa (O. P.-Cambridge, 1885) — Yarkand
- Lycosa salifodina McKay, 1976 — Western Australia
- Lycosa salvadorensis Kraus, 1955 — El Salvador
- Lycosa separata (Roewer, 1960) — Mozambique
- Lycosa septembris (Strand, 1906) — Ethiopia
- Lycosa sericovittata Mello-Leitao, 1939 — Brazil
- Lycosa serranoa Tullgren, 1901 — Chile
- Lycosa shahapuraensis Gajbe, 2004 — India
- Lycosa shaktae Bhandari & Gajbe, 2001 — India
- Lycosa shansia (Hogg, 1912) — China, Mongolia
- Lycosa shillongensis Tikader & Malhotra, 1980 — India
- Lycosa signata Lenz, 1886 — Madagascar
- Lycosa signiventris Banks, 1909 — El Salvador, Costa Rica
- Lycosa sigridae (Strand, 1917) — Mexico
- Lycosa similis Banks, 1892 — USA
- Lycosa singoriensis (Laxmann, 1770) — Palearctic
- Lycosa sochoi Mello-Leitao, 1947 — Brazil
- Lycosa storeniformis Simon, 1910 — Guinea-Bissau
- Lycosa subfusca F. O. P.-Cambridge, 1902 — Mexico, Costa Rica
- Lycosa suzukii Yaginuma, 1960 — Russia, China, Korea, Japan
- Lycosa sylvatica (Roewer, 1951) — Algeria
- Lycosa tarantula (Linnaeus, 1758) — Southeastern Europe, Mediterranean, Near East
  - Lycosa tarantula carsica Caporiacco, 1949 — Italy
  - Lycosa tarantula cisalpina Simon, 1937 — France
- Lycosa tarantuloides Perty, 1833 — Brazil
- Lycosa tasmanicola Roewer, 1960 — Tasmania
- Lycosa teranganicola (Strand, 1911) — Aru Islands
- Lycosa terrestris Butt, Anwar & Tahir, 2006 — Pakistan
- Lycosa tetrophthalma Mello-Leitao, 1939 — Paraguay
- Lycosa thoracica Patel & Reddy, 1993 — India
- Lycosa thorelli (Keyserling, 1877) — Colombia to Argentina
- Lycosa tista Tikader, 1970 — India
- Lycosa transversa F. O. P.-Cambridge, 1902 — Guatemala
- Lycosa trichopus (Roewer, 1960) — Afghanistan
- Lycosa tula (Strand, 1913) — Western Australia
- Lycosa u-album Mello-Leitao, 1938 — Argentina
- Lycosa vachoni Guy, 1966 — Algeria
- Lycosa vellutina Mello-Leitao, 1941 — Colombia
- Lycosa ventralis F. O. P.-Cambridge, 1902 — Mexico
- Lycosa vittata Yin, Bao & Zhang, 1995 — China
- Lycosa wadaiensis Roewer, 1960 — Chad
- Lycosa wangi Yin, Peng & Wang, 1996 — China
- Lycosa woonda McKay, 1979 — Western Australia
- Lycosa wroughtoni Pocock, 1899 — India
- Lycosa wulsini Fox, 1935 — China
- Lycosa yalkara McKay, 1979 — Western Australia
- Lycosa yerburyi Pocock, 1901 — Sri Lanka
- Lycosa yizhangensis Yin, Peng & Wang, 1996 — China
- Lycosa yunnanensis Yin, Peng & Wang, 1996 — China

== Lycosella ==
Lycosella Thorell, 1890

- Lycosella annulata Simon, 1900 — Hawaii
- Lycosella minuta Thorell, 1890 — Sumatra
- Lycosella spinipes Simon, 1900 — Hawaii
- Lycosella tenera Thorell, 1890 — Sumatra
  - Lycosella tenera bisulcata Thorell, 1890 — Sumatra

== Lysania ==
Lysania Thorell, 1890

- Lysania deangia Li, Wang & Zhang, 2013 — China
- Lysania pygmaea Thorell, 1890 — China, Malaysia
- Lysania sabahensis Lehtinen & Hippa, 1979 — Borneo

== Mainosa ==
Mainosa Framenau, 2006

- Mainosa longipes (L. Koch, 1878) — Western Australia, South Australia

== Malimbosa ==
Malimbosa Roewer, 1960

- Malimbosa lamperti (Strand, 1906) — West Africa

== Margonia ==
Margonia Hippa & Lehtinen, 1983

- Margonia himalayensis (Gravely, 1924) — India

== Megarctosa ==
Megarctosa Caporiacco, 1948

- Megarctosa aequioculata (Strand, 1906) — Ethiopia
- Megarctosa argentata (Denis, 1947) — North Africa
- Megarctosa bamiana Roewer, 1960 — Afghanistan
- Megarctosa caporiaccoi Roewer, 1960 — Cameroon
- Megarctosa gobiensis (Schenkel, 1936) — Mongolia
- Megarctosa melanostoma (Mello-Leitao, 1941) — Argentina
- Megarctosa naccai Caporiacco, 1948 — Greece

== Melocosa ==
Melocosa Gertsch, 1937

- Melocosa fumosa (Emerton, 1894) — USA, Canada, Alaska
- Melocosa gertschi Mello-Leitao, 1947 — Brazil

== Minicosa ==
Minicosa Alderweireldt & Jocque, 2007

- Minicosa neptuna Alderweireldt & Jocque, 2007 — South Africa

== Molitorosa ==
Molitorosa Roewer, 1960

- Molitorosa molitor (Bertkau, 1880) — Brazil

== Mongolicosa ==
Mongolicosa Marusik, Azarkina & Koponen, 2004

- Mongolicosa buryatica Marusik, Azarkina & Koponen, 2004 — Russia
- Mongolicosa glupovi Marusik, Azarkina & Koponen, 2004 — Russia
- Mongolicosa gobiensis Marusik, Azarkina & Koponen, 2004 — Mongolia
- Mongolicosa mongolensis Marusik, Azarkina & Koponen, 2004 — Mongolia
- Mongolicosa pseudoferruginea (Schenkel, 1936) — China
- Mongolicosa songi Marusik, Azarkina & Koponen, 2004 — Mongolia, China

== Mustelicosa ==
Mustelicosa Roewer, 1960

- Mustelicosa dimidiata (Thorell, 1875) — Russia, Ukraine, Turkmenistan, Mongolia, China
- Mustelicosa ordosa (Hogg, 1912) — China

== Navira ==
Navira Piacentini & Grismado, 2009

- Navira naguan Piacentini & Grismado, 2009 — Argentina

== Notocosa ==
Notocosa Vink, 2002

- Notocosa bellicosa (Goyen, 1888) — New Zealand

== Oculicosa ==
Oculicosa Zyuzin, 1993

- Oculicosa supermirabilis Zyuzin, 1993 — Kazakhstan, Uzbekistan, Turkmenistan

== Ocyale ==
Ocyale Audouin, 1826

- Ocyale dewinterae Alderweireldt, 1996 — Malawi, Namibia
- Ocyale discrepans Roewer, 1960 — Ethiopia
- Ocyale fera Strand, 1908 — Madagascar
- Ocyale grandis Alderweireldt, 1996 — Togo, Congo, Namibia
- Ocyale guttata (Karsch, 1878) — Tanzania to South Africa
- Ocyale huachoi (Mello-Leitao, 1942) — Peru
- Ocyale kalpiensis Gajbe, 2004 — India
- Ocyale kumari Dyal, 1935 — Pakistan
- Ocyale lanca (Karsch, 1879) — Sri Lanka
- Ocyale pelliona (Audouin, 1826) — North Africa
- Ocyale pilosa (Roewer, 1960) — West Africa to Myanmar
- Ocyale qiongzhongensis Yin & Peng, 1997 — China

== Orinocosa ==
Orinocosa Chamberlin, 1916

- Orinocosa aymara Chamberlin, 1916 — Peru
- Orinocosa celerierae Cornic, 1976 — Ivory Coast
- Orinocosa guentheri (Pocock, 1899) — Iran
- Orinocosa hansi (Strand, 1916) — Southern Africa
- Orinocosa paraguensis (Gertsch & Wallace, 1937) — Paraguay
- Orinocosa priesneri Roewer, 1959 — Egypt
- Orinocosa pulchra Caporiacco, 1947 — Guyana
- Orinocosa securifer (Tullgren, 1905) — Argentina
- Orinocosa stirlingae (Hogg, 1905) — New South Wales
- Orinocosa tropica Roewer, 1959 — Uganda

== Orthocosa ==
Orthocosa Roewer, 1960

- Orthocosa ambigua (Denis, 1947) — Egypt
- Orthocosa orophila (Thorell, 1887) — Myanmar
- Orthocosa semicincta (L. Koch, 1877) — Queensland
- Orthocosa sternomaculata (Mello-Leitao, 1943) — Brazil
- Orthocosa tokunagai (Saito, 1936) — China

== Paratrochosina ==
Paratrochosina Roewer, 1960

- Paratrochosina amica (Mello-Leitao, 1941) — Argentina
- Paratrochosina insolita (L. Koch, 1879) — Canada, Alaska, Russia
- Paratrochosina sagittigera (Roewer, 1951) — Russia

== Pardosa ==
Pardosa C. L. Koch, 1847

- Pardosa abagensis Ovtsharenko, 1979 — Russia, Abkhazia
- Pardosa aciculifera Chen, Song & Li, 2001 — China
- Pardosa acorensis Simon, 1883 — Azores
- Pardosa adustella (Roewer, 1951) — Russia, Mongolia, China
- Pardosa aenigmatica Tongiorgi, 1966 — Italy, Turkey, Azerbaijan
- Pardosa afflicta (Holmberg, 1876) — Argentina
- Pardosa agrestis (Westring, 1861) — Palearctic
  - Pardosa agrestis purbeckensis F. O. P.-Cambridge, 1895 — Western, Central Europe
- Pardosa agricola (Thorell, 1856) — Europe to Kazakhstan
  - Pardosa agricola borussica (Dahl, 1908) — Lithuania
  - Pardosa agricola fucicola (Dahl, 1908) — Finland, Germany
- Pardosa alacris (C. L. Koch, 1833) — Europe, Russia
- Pardosa alasaniensis Mcheidze, 1997 — Georgia
- Pardosa albatula (Roewer, 1951) — Europe
- Pardosa alboannulata Yin et al., 1997 — China
- Pardosa albomaculata Emerton, 1885 — USA, Canada, Alaska, Greenland
- Pardosa algens (Kulczynski, 1908) — Canada, Alaska, Russia
- Pardosa algina (Chamberlin, 1916) — Peru
- Pardosa algoides Schenkel, 1963 — India, Bangladesh, China
- Pardosa alii Tikader, 1977 — India
- Pardosa altamontis Chamberlin & Ivie, 1946 — USA, Canada
- Pardosa alticola Alderweireldt & Jocque, 1992 — Ethiopia, Congo, Rwanda
- Pardosa altitudis Tikader & Malhotra, 1980 — India, China
- Pardosa amacuzacensis Jimenez, 1983 — Mexico
- Pardosa amamiensis (Nakatsudi, 1943) — Ryukyu Islands
- Pardosa amazonia (Thorell, 1895) — Myanmar
- Pardosa amentata (Clerck, 1757) — Europe, Russia
- Pardosa amkhasensis Tikader & Malhotra, 1976 — India
- Pardosa anchoroides Yu & Song, 1988 — China
- Pardosa ancorifera Schenkel, 1936 — China
- Pardosa anfibia Zapfe-Mann, 1979 — Chile
- Pardosa angolensis (Roewer, 1959) — Angola
- Pardosa angusta Denis, 1956 — Morocco
- Pardosa angustifrons Caporiacco, 1941 — Ethiopia
- Pardosa anomala Gertsch, 1933 — USA, Canada
- Pardosa apostoli Barrion & Litsinger, 1995 — Philippines
- Pardosa aquatilis Schmidt & Krause, 1995 — Cape Verde Islands
- Pardosa aquila Buchar & Thaler, 1998 — Russia, Georgia
- Pardosa arctica (Kulczynski, 1916) — Russia
- Pardosa astrigera L. Koch, 1878 — Russia, China, Korea, Taiwan, Japan
- Pardosa atlantica Emerton, 1913 — USA
- Pardosa atomaria (C. L. Koch, 1847) — Balkans, Cyprus, Rhodes, Aegean Islands
- Pardosa atrata (Thorell, 1873) — Palearctic
- Pardosa atromedia Banks, 1904 — USA
- Pardosa atronigra Song, 1995 — China
- Pardosa atropos (L. Koch, 1878) — China, Korea, Japan
- Pardosa aurantipes (Strand, 1906) — Ethiopia
- Pardosa azerifalcata Marusik, Guseinov & Koponen, 2003 — Azerbaijan
- Pardosa baehrorum Kronestedt, 1999 — Germany, Switzerland, Austria
- Pardosa balaghatensis Gajbe, 2004 — India
- Pardosa baoshanensis Wang & Qiu, 1991 — China
- Pardosa baraan Logunov & Marusik, 1995 — Russia, Mongolia
- Pardosa bargaonensis Gajbe, 2004 — India
- Pardosa basiri (Dyal, 1935) — Pakistan
- Pardosa bastarensis Gajbe, 2004 — India
- Pardosa baxianensis Wang & Song, 1993 — China
- Pardosa beijiangensis Hu & Wu, 1989 — China
- Pardosa bellona Banks, 1898 — USA, Mexico
- Pardosa benadira Caporiacco, 1940 — Ethiopia
- Pardosa bendamira Roewer, 1960 — Afghanistan
- Pardosa beringiana Dondale & Redner, 1987 — Canada, Alaska
- Pardosa bidentata Franganillo, 1936 — Cuba
- Pardosa bifasciata (C. L. Koch, 1834) — Palearctic
- Pardosa birabeni Mello-Leitao, 1938 — Argentina
- Pardosa birmanica Simon, 1884 — Pakistan to China, Philippines, Sumatra
- Pardosa blanda (C. L. Koch, 1833) — Palearctic
- Pardosa bleyi (Dahl, 1908) — Bismarck Archipel
- Pardosa brevimetatarsis (Strand, 1907) — Java
- Pardosa brevivulva Tanaka, 1975 — Russia, China, Korea, Japan
- Pardosa brunellii Caporiacco, 1940 — Ethiopia
- Pardosa buchari Ovtsharenko, 1979 — Russia, Georgia, Iran
- Pardosa bucklei Kronestedt, 1975 — USA, Canada
- Pardosa bukukun Logunov & Marusik, 1995 — Russia, Mongolia, China
- Pardosa burasantiensis Tikader & Malhotra, 1976 — India, China
- Pardosa buriatica Sternbergs, 1979 — Russia
- Pardosa californica Keyserling, 1887 — USA, Mexico
- Pardosa caliraya Barrion & Litsinger, 1995 — Philippines
- Pardosa canalis F. O. P.-Cambridge, 1902 — Mexico
- Pardosa caucasica Ovtsharenko, 1979 — Russia, Abkhazia, Azerbaijan
- Pardosa cavannae Simon, 1881 — Italy, Albania
- Pardosa cayennensis (Taczanowski, 1874) — French Guiana
- Pardosa cervina Schenkel, 1936 — China
- Pardosa cervinopilosa Schenkel, 1936 — China
- Pardosa chahraka Roewer, 1960 — Afghanistan
- Pardosa chambaensis Tikader & Malhotra, 1976 — India
- Pardosa chapini (Fox, 1935) — China
- Pardosa chenbuensis Yin et al., 1997 — China
- Pardosa chiapasiana Gertsch & Wallace, 1937 — Mexico
- Pardosa chindanda Roewer, 1960 — Afghanistan
- Pardosa cincta (Kulczynski, 1887) — Central, Eastern Europe
- Pardosa cinerascens (Roewer, 1951) — Madagascar
- Pardosa clavipalpis Purcell, 1903 — East, South Africa
- Pardosa cluens Roewer, 1959 — Cameroon
- Pardosa colchica Mcheidze, 1946 — Georgia, Armenia, Azerbaijan
- Pardosa coloradensis Banks, 1894 — USA, Canada, Alaska
- Pardosa completa (Roewer, 1959) — Mozambique
- Pardosa concinna (Thorell, 1877) — USA, Canada
- Pardosa concolorata (Roewer, 1951) — Mexico
- Pardosa condolens (O. P.-Cambridge, 1885) — Central Asia
- Pardosa confalonierii Caporiacco, 1928 — North Africa
- Pardosa confusa Kronestedt, 1988 — USA
- Pardosa consimilis Nosek, 1905 — Turkey
- Pardosa costrica Chamberlin & Ivie, 1942 — Costa Rica
- Pardosa crassipalpis Purcell, 1903 — South Africa
- Pardosa crassistyla Kronestedt, 1988 — USA
- Pardosa credula (O. P.-Cambridge, 1885) — Tajikistan
- Pardosa cribrata Simon, 1876 — Southern Europe, Algeria
  - Pardosa cribrata catalonica Simon, 1937 — Spain
- Pardosa cubana Bryant, 1940 — Cuba, Jamaica, Grand Cayman Islands
- Pardosa dabiensis Chai & Yang, 1998 — China
- Pardosa dagestana Buchar & Thaler, 1998 — Russia
- Pardosa daisetsuensis Tanaka, 2005 — Japan
- Pardosa dalkhaba Roewer, 1960 — Afghanistan
- Pardosa danica (Sørensen, 1904) — Denmark
- Pardosa darolii (Strand, 1906) — Ethiopia
- Pardosa datongensis Yin, Peng & Kim, 1997 — China
- Pardosa debolinae Majumder, 2004 — India
- Pardosa delicatula Gertsch & Wallace, 1935 — USA, Mexico
- Pardosa dentitegulum Yin et al., 1997 — China
- Pardosa desolatula Gertsch & Davis, 1940 — Mexico
- Pardosa dilecta Banks, 1898 — Mexico
- Pardosa distincta (Blackwall, 1846) — USA, Canada
- Pardosa diuturna Fox, 1937 — Canada, Alaska
- Pardosa donabila Roewer, 1955 — Iran
- Pardosa dondalei Jimenez, 1986 — Mexico
- Pardosa dorsalis Banks, 1894 — USA, Canada
- Pardosa dorsuncata Lowrie & Dondale, 1981 — USA, Canada, Alaska
- Pardosa dranensis Hogg, 1922 — Vietnam
- Pardosa drenskii Buchar, 1968 — Bulgaria
- Pardosa duplicata Saha, Biswas & Raychaudhuri, 1994 — India
- Pardosa dzheminey Marusik, 1995 — Kazakhstan
- Pardosa ecatli Jimenez, 1985 — Mexico
- Pardosa eiseni (Thorell, 1875) — Palearctic
- Pardosa ejusmodi (O. P.-Cambridge, 1872) — Syria
- Pardosa elegans (Thorell, 1875) — Russia
- Pardosa elegantula (Roewer, 1959) — Congo
- Pardosa enucleata Roewer, 1959 — South Africa
- Pardosa erupticia (Strand, 1913) — Rwanda
- Pardosa eskovi Kronestedt & Marusik, 2011 — Russia
- Pardosa evanescens Alderweireldt & Jocque, 2008 — Ivory Coast
- Pardosa evelinae Wunderlich, 1984 — Eastern Europe
- Pardosa falcata Schenkel, 1963 — Mongolia, China
- Pardosa falcifera F. O. P.-Cambridge, 1902 — USA to Costa Rica
- Pardosa falcula F. O. P.-Cambridge, 1902 — Guatemala
- Pardosa fallax Barnes, 1959 — Mexico
- Pardosa fastosa (Keyserling, 1877) — Costa Rica to Ecuador
  - Pardosa fastosa viota (Strand, 1914) — Colombia
- Pardosa femoralis Simon, 1876 — France, Spain, Russia
- Pardosa fengi Marusik, Nadolny & Omelko, 2013 — China
- Pardosa ferruginea (L. Koch, 1870) — Palearctic
- Pardosa flammula Mello-Leitao, 1945 — Argentina
- Pardosa flata Qu, Peng & Yin, 2010 — China
- Pardosa flavida (O. P.-Cambridge, 1885) — Yarkand, Turkmenistan, China
- Pardosa flavipalpis F. O. P.-Cambridge, 1902 — Mexico
- Pardosa flavipes Hu, 2001 — China
- Pardosa flavisterna Caporiacco, 1935 — Pakistan, India
- Pardosa fletcheri (Gravely, 1924) — Pakistan, India, Nepal
- Pardosa floridana (Banks, 1896) — USA, Cuba
- Pardosa fortunata (O. P.-Cambridge, 1885) — Central Asia
- Pardosa fritzeni Ballarin et al., 2012 — Kyrgyzstan
- Pardosa fulvipes (Collett, 1876) — Palearctic
- Pardosa furcifera (Thorell, 1875) — Canada, Alaska, Greenland, Iceland
- Pardosa fuscosoma Wunderlich, 1992 — Canary Islands
- Pardosa fuscula (Thorell, 1875) — USA, Canada, Alaska
- Pardosa gastropicta Roewer, 1959 — Kenya
- Pardosa gefsana Roewer, 1959 — Spain, Sicily, Sardinia, North Africa
- Pardosa gerhardti (Strand, 1922) — Sumatra
- Pardosa ghigii Caporiacco, 1932 — Morocco
- Pardosa ghourbanda Roewer, 1960 — Afghanistan
- Pardosa giebeli (Pavesi, 1873) — Europe
- Pardosa glabra Mello-Leitao, 1938 — Argentina
- Pardosa glacialis (Thorell, 1872) — Holarctic
- Pardosa golbagha Roewer, 1960 — Afghanistan
- Pardosa gopalai Patel & Reddy, 1993 — India
- Pardosa gothicana Lowrie & Dondale, 1981 — USA
- Pardosa gracilenta (Lucas, 1846) — Algeria
- Pardosa graminea Tanaka, 1985 — China, Japan
- Pardosa groenlandica (Thorell, 1872) — Russia, Alaska, Canada, USA, Greenland
- Pardosa gromovi Ballarin et al., 2012 — Kazakhstan
- Pardosa guadalajarana Dondale & Redner, 1984 — Mexico to El Salvador
- Pardosa guerechka Roewer, 1960 — Afghanistan
- Pardosa gusarensis Marusik, Guseinov & Koponen, 2003 — Azerbaijan
- Pardosa haibeiensis Yin et al., 1995 — China
- Pardosa hamifera F. O. P.-Cambridge, 1902 — Mexico, Honduras, Jamaica, Hispaniola
- Pardosa hartmanni (Roewer, 1959) — Tanzania
- Pardosa hatanensis Urita, Tang & Song, 1993 — China
- Pardosa haupti Song, 1995 — China
- Pardosa hedini Schenkel, 1936 — Russia, China, Korea, Japan
- Pardosa herbosa Jo & Paik, 1984 — Russia, China, Korea, Japan
- Pardosa hetchi Chamberlin & Ivie, 1942 — USA
- Pardosa heterophthalma (Simon, 1898) — India to Java
- Pardosa hohxilensis Song, 1995 — China
- Pardosa hokkaido Tanaka & Suwa, 1986 — Russia, Japan
- Pardosa hortensis (Thorell, 1872) — Palearctic
- Pardosa hydaspis Caporiacco, 1935 — Karakorum
- Pardosa hyperborea (Thorell, 1872) — Holarctic
- Pardosa hypocrita (Simon, 1882) — Yemen
- Pardosa ibex Buchar & Thaler, 1998 — Russia, Georgia
- Pardosa ilgunensis Nosek, 1905 — Turkey
- Pardosa incerta Nosek, 1905 — Turkey, Russia, Azerbaijan
- Pardosa indecora L. Koch, 1879 — Russia, China
- Pardosa iniqua (O. P.-Cambridge, 1876) — Egypt
- Pardosa injucunda (O. P.-Cambridge, 1876) — Africa
- Pardosa inopina (O. P.-Cambridge, 1876) — Egypt to East Africa
- Pardosa inquieta (O. P.-Cambridge, 1876) — Egypt
- Pardosa intermedia (Bösenberg, 1903) — Germany
- Pardosa invenusta (C. L. Koch, 1837) — Greece
- Pardosa irretita Simon, 1886 — Thailand, Malaysia, Borneo
- Pardosa irriensis Barrion & Litsinger, 1995 — Philippines
- Pardosa isago Tanaka, 1977 — Russia, China, Korea, Japan
- Pardosa italica Tongiorgi, 1966 — Southern Europe to China
  - Pardosa italica valenta Zyuzin, 1976 — Central Asia
- Pardosa izabella Chamberlin & Ivie, 1942 — Guatemala
- Pardosa jabalpurensis Gajbe & Gajbe, 1999 — India
- Pardosa jaikensis Ponomarev, 2007 — Russia, Kazakhstan
- Pardosa jambaruensis Tanaka, 1990 — China, Taiwan, Okinawa
- Pardosa jartica Urita, Tang & Song, 1993 — China
- Pardosa jaundea (Roewer, 1960) — Cameroon
- Pardosa jeniseica Eskov & Marusik, 1995 — Russia, Kazakhstan
- Pardosa jergeniensis Ponomarev, 1979 — Russia, Kazakhstan
- Pardosa jinpingensis Yin et al., 1997 — China
- Pardosa josemitensis (Strand, 1908) — USA
- Pardosa kalpiensis Gajbe, 2004 — India
- Pardosa karagonis (Strand, 1913) — Central, East Africa
  - Pardosa karagonis nivicola Lessert, 1926 — Tanzania
- Pardosa katangana Roewer, 1959 — Congo
- Pardosa kavango Alderweireldt & Jocque, 1992 — Namibia, Botswana
- Pardosa knappi Dondale, 2007 — USA
- Pardosa kondeana Roewer, 1959 — East Africa
- Pardosa krausi (Roewer, 1959) — Tanzania
- Pardosa kronestedti Song, Zhang & Zhu, 2002 — China
- Pardosa kupupa (Tikader, 1970) — India, China
- Pardosa labradorensis (Thorell, 1875) — USA, Canada
- Pardosa laciniata Song & Haupt, 1995 — China
- Pardosa laevitarsis Tanaka & Suwa, 1986 — Japan, Okinawa
- Pardosa lagenaria Qu, Peng & Yin, 2010 — China
- Pardosa laidlawi Simon, 1901 — Malaysia
- Pardosa lapidicina Emerton, 1885 — USA, Canada
- Pardosa lapponica (Thorell, 1872) — Holarctic
- Pardosa lasciva L. Koch, 1879 — Palearctic
- Pardosa latibasa Qu, Peng & Yin, 2010 — China
- Pardosa laura Karsch, 1879 — Russia, China, Korea, Taiwan, Japan
- Pardosa lawrencei Roewer, 1959 — Tanzania
- Pardosa leipoldti Purcell, 1903 — South Africa
- Pardosa leprevosti Mello-Leitao, 1947 — Brazil
- Pardosa lignosus Ghafoor & Alvi, 2007 — Pakistan
- Pardosa lii Marusik, Nadolny & Omelko, 2013 — China
- Pardosa limata Roewer, 1959 — Namibia
- Pardosa lineata F. O. P.-Cambridge, 1902 — Mexico
- Pardosa linguata F. O. P.-Cambridge, 1902 — Mexico
- Pardosa litangensis Xu, Zhu & Kim, 2010 — China
- Pardosa littoralis Banks, 1896 — USA, Canada, Cuba
- Pardosa logunovi Kronestedt & Marusik, 2011 — Russia, Mongolia
- Pardosa lombokibia (Strand, 1915) — Lombok
- Pardosa longionycha Yin et al., 1995 — China
- Pardosa longisepta Chen & Song, 2002 — China
- Pardosa longivulva F. O. P.-Cambridge, 1902 — Mexico, Guatemala
- Pardosa lowriei Kronestedt, 1975 — USA, Canada, Alaska
- Pardosa luctinosa Simon, 1876 — Palearctic
  - Pardosa luctinosa etsinensis Schenkel, 1963 — China
  - Pardosa luctinosa marina (Kolosvary, 1940) — Balkans
- Pardosa ludia (Thorell, 1895) — Myanmar
- Pardosa lugubris (Walckenaer, 1802) — Palearctic
- Pardosa lurida Roewer, 1959 — Tanzania
- Pardosa lusingana Roewer, 1959 — Congo, Namibia
- Pardosa lycosina Purcell, 1903 — South Africa
- Pardosa lycosinella Lawrence, 1927 — Namibia
- Pardosa lyrata (Odenwall, 1901) — Russia, Mongolia
- Pardosa lyrifera Schenkel, 1936 — China, Korea, Japan
- Pardosa mabinii Barrion & Litsinger, 1995 — Philippines
- Pardosa mabweana Roewer, 1959 — Congo
- Pardosa mackenziana (Keyserling, 1877) — USA, Canada, Alaska
- Pardosa maculata Franganillo, 1931 — Cuba
- Pardosa maculatipes (Keyserling, 1887) — Chile
- Pardosa maimaneha Roewer, 1960 — Afghanistan
- Pardosa maisa Hippa & Mannila, 1982 — Finland, Austria, Hungary, Czech Republic, Poland, Russia
- Pardosa manicata Thorell, 1899 — Cameroon
- Pardosa manubriata Simon, 1898 — East, Southern Africa
- Pardosa marchei Simon, 1890 — Mariana Islands
- Pardosa marialuisae Dondale & Redner, 1984 — Mexico to Honduras
- Pardosa martensi Buchar, 1978 — Nepal
- Pardosa martinii (Pavesi, 1883) — Ethiopia
- Pardosa masareyi Mello-Leitao, 1939 — Ecuador
- Pardosa masurae Esyunin & Efimik, 1998 — Russia
- Pardosa mayana Dondale & Redner, 1984 — Mexico to Costa Rica
- Pardosa medialis Banks, 1898 — Mexico
- Pardosa mendicans (Simon, 1882) — Yemen
- Pardosa mercurialis Montgomery, 1904 — USA
- Pardosa messingerae (Strand, 1916) — West, Central, East Africa
- Pardosa metlakatla Emerton, 1917 — USA, Canada, Alaska
- Pardosa mikhailovi Ballarin et al., 2012 — Kazakhstan
- Pardosa milvina (Hentz, 1844) — USA, Canada
- Pardosa minuta Tikader & Malhotra, 1976 — India, Bangladesh
- Pardosa mionebulosa Yin et al., 1997 — China
- Pardosa miquanensis Yin et al., 1995 — China
- Pardosa mira Caporiacco, 1941 — Ethiopia
- Pardosa mixta (Kulczynski, 1887) — Europe, Turkey
- Pardosa modica (Blackwall, 1846) — USA, Canada
- Pardosa moesta Banks, 1892 — USA, Canada, Alaska
- Pardosa mongolica Kulczynski, 1901 — Russia, Tajikistan, Nepal, Mongolia, China
- Pardosa montgomeryi Gertsch, 1934 — USA, Mexico
- Pardosa monticola (Clerck, 1757) — Palearctic
  - Pardosa monticola ambigua Simon, 1937 — France
  - Pardosa monticola minima Simon, 1876 — France
  - Pardosa monticola pseudosaltuaria Simon, 1937 — France
- Pardosa mordagica Tang, Urita & Song, 1995 — China
- Pardosa morosa (L. Koch, 1870) — Europe to Central Asia
- Pardosa mtugensis (Strand, 1908) — North Africa
- Pardosa mubalea Roewer, 1959 — Congo
- Pardosa mukundi Tikader & Malhotra, 1980 — India
- Pardosa mulaiki Gertsch, 1934 — USA, Canada
- Pardosa multidontata Qu, Peng & Yin, 2010 — China
- Pardosa multivaga Simon, 1880 — China
- Pardosa muzafari Ghafoor & Alvi, 2007 — Pakistan
- Pardosa muzkolica Kononenko, 1978 — Tajikistan
- Pardosa mysorensis (Tikader & Mukerji, 1971) — India
- Pardosa naevia (L. Koch, 1875) — Egypt, Ethiopia
- Pardosa naevioides (Strand, 1916) — Namibia
- Pardosa nanica Mello-Leitao, 1941 — Argentina
- Pardosa nanyuensis Yin et al., 1995 — China
- Pardosa narymica Savelyeva, 1972 — Kazakhstan
- Pardosa nebulosa (Thorell, 1872) — Palearctic
  - Pardosa nebulosa orientalis (Kroneberg, 1875) — Russia, Georgia
- Pardosa nenilini Marusik, 1995 — Russia, Kazakhstan, Mongolia
- Pardosa nesiotis (Thorell, 1878) — Sumatra, Amboina
- Pardosa nigra (C. L. Koch, 1834) — Palearctic
- Pardosa nigriceps (Thorell, 1856) — Europe
- Pardosa ninigoriensis Mcheidze, 1997 — Georgia
- Pardosa nojimai Tanaka, 1998 — Japan
- Pardosa nordicolens Chamberlin & Ivie, 1947 — Canada, Alaska, Russia
- Pardosa nostrorum Alderweireldt & Jocque, 1992 — Mozambique, South Africa
- Pardosa novitatis (Strand, 1906) — Ethiopia
- Pardosa obscuripes Simon, 1909 — Morocco
- Pardosa observans (O. P.-Cambridge, 1876) — Egypt
- Pardosa occidentalis Simon, 1881 — Portugal, France, Sardinia
- Pardosa odenwalli Sternbergs, 1979 — Russia
- Pardosa oksalai Marusik, Hippa & Koponen, 1996 — Russia
- Pardosa oljunae Lobanova, 1978 — Russia
- Pardosa olympica Tongiorgi, 1966 — Greece
- Pardosa oncka Lawrence, 1927 — Africa
- Pardosa ontariensis Gertsch, 1933 — USA, Canada
- Pardosa orcchaensis Gajbe, 2004 — India
- Pardosa orealis Buchar, 1984 — Nepal
- Pardosa oreophila Simon, 1937 — Central, Southern Europe
- Pardosa oriens (Chamberlin, 1924) — China, Japan, Okinawa
- Pardosa orophila Gertsch, 1933 — USA, Mexico
- Pardosa orthodox Chamberlin, 1924 — USA, Mexico
- Pardosa ourayensis Gertsch, 1933 — USA
- Pardosa ovambica Roewer, 1959 — Namibia
- Pardosa ovtchinnikovi Ballarin et al., 2012 — Central Asia
- Pardosa pacata Fox, 1937 — Hong Kong
- Pardosa pahalanga Barrion & Litsinger, 1995 — Philippines
- Pardosa paleata Alderweireldt & Jocque, 1992 — Libya
- Pardosa paludicola (Clerck, 1757) — Palearctic
- Pardosa palustris (Linnaeus, 1758) — Holarctic
  - Pardosa palustris islandica (Strand, 1906) — Iceland
- Pardosa pantinii Ballarin et al., 2012 — Tajikistan
- Pardosa papilionaca Chen & Song, 2003 — China
- Pardosa paracolchica Zyuzin & Logunov, 2000 — Russia, Azerbaijan
- Pardosa paralapponica Schenkel, 1963 — Mongolia, China
- Pardosa paramushirensis (Nakatsudi, 1937) — Kurile Islands, Japan
- Pardosa paratesquorum Schenkel, 1963 — Russia, Mongolia, China
- Pardosa partita Simon, 1885 — India
- Pardosa parvula Banks, 1904 — USA
- Pardosa passibilis (O. P.-Cambridge, 1885) — Kyrgyzstan
- Pardosa patapatensis Barrion & Litsinger, 1995 — Philippines
- Pardosa pauxilla Montgomery, 1904 — USA
- Pardosa pedia Dondale, 2007 — Canada
- Pardosa persica Marusik, Ballarin & Omelko, 2012 — Iran
- Pardosa pertinax von Helversen, 2000 — Greece
- Pardosa petrunkevitchi Gertsch, 1934 — Mexico
- Pardosa pexa Hickman, 1944 — South Australia
- Pardosa pinangensis (Thorell, 1890) — Malaysia, Sumatra
- Pardosa pirkuliensis Zyuzin & Logunov, 2000 — Azerbaijan
- Pardosa plagula F. O. P.-Cambridge, 1902 — Mexico
- Pardosa plumipedata (Roewer, 1951) — Argentina
- Pardosa plumipes (Thorell, 1875) — Palearctic
- Pardosa podhorskii (Kulczynski, 1907) — Canada, Alaska, Russia
- Pardosa poecila (Herman, 1879) — Hungary
- Pardosa pontica (Thorell, 1875) — Eastern Europe to Central Asia
- Pardosa portoricensis Banks, 1901 — Puerto Rico, Virgin Islands, Antigua
- Pardosa potamophila Lawrence, 1927 — Namibia
- Pardosa praepes Simon, 1886 — Senegal
- Pardosa prativaga (L. Koch, 1870) — Europe, Russia
  - Pardosa prativaga scoparia Simon, 1937 — France
- Pardosa procurva Yu & Song, 1988 — China, Taiwan
- Pardosa profuga (Herman, 1879) — Hungary
- Pardosa prolifica F. O. P.-Cambridge, 1902 — Mexico to Panama
- Pardosa proxima (C. L. Koch, 1847) — Palearctic, Canary Islands, Azores
  - Pardosa proxima annulatoides (Strand, 1915) — Israel
  - Pardosa proxima antoni (Strand, 1915) — Israel
  - Pardosa proxima poetica Simon, 1876 — Portugal, Spain, France
- Pardosa psammodes (Thorell, 1887) — Myanmar
- Pardosa pseudoannulata (Bösenberg & Strand, 1906) — Pakistan to Japan, Philippines, Java
- Pardosa pseudochapini Peng, 2011 — China
- Pardosa pseudokaragonis (Strand, 1913) — Central Africa
- Pardosa pseudolapponica Marusik, 1995 — Kazakhstan
- Pardosa pseudomixta Marusik & Fritzén, 2009 — China
- Pardosa pseudostrigillata Tongiorgi, 1966 — Austria, Italy, Slovenia
- Pardosa pseudotorrentum Miller & Buchar, 1972 — Afghanistan
- Pardosa pullata (Clerck, 1757) — Europe, Russia, Central Asia
  - Pardosa pullata jugorum Simon, 1937 — France
- Pardosa pumilio Roewer, 1959 — Ethiopia
- Pardosa pusiola (Thorell, 1891) — India to China and Java
- Pardosa pyrenaica Kronestedt, 2007 — France, Andorra, Spain
- Pardosa qingzangensis Hu, 2001 — China
- Pardosa qinhaiensis Yin et al., 1995 — China
- Pardosa qionghuai Yin et al., 1995 — China
- Pardosa rabulana (Thorell, 1890) — Malaysia, Sumatra, Java
- Pardosa rainieriana Lowrie & Dondale, 1981 — USA, Canada
- Pardosa ramulosa (McCook, 1894) — USA, Mexico
- Pardosa ranjani Gajbe, 2004 — India
- Pardosa rara (Keyserling, 1891) — Brazil
- Pardosa rascheri (Dahl, 1908) — Bismarck Archipel
- Pardosa rhenockensis (Tikader, 1970) — India
- Pardosa rhombisepta Roewer, 1960 — Afghanistan
- Pardosa riparia (C. L. Koch, 1833) — Palearctic
- Pardosa riveti Berland, 1913 — Ecuador
- Pardosa roeweri Schenkel, 1963 — China
- Pardosa roscai (Roewer, 1951) — Bulgaria, Romania, Turkey
- Pardosa royi Biswas & Raychaudhuri, 2003 — Bangladesh
- Pardosa ruanda (Strand, 1913) — Rwanda
- Pardosa rudis Yin et al., 1995 — China
- Pardosa rugegensis (Strand, 1913) — Central Africa
- Pardosa sagei Gertsch & Wallace, 1937 — Panama
- Pardosa saltans Töpfer-Hofmann, 2000 — Europe, Turkey
- Pardosa saltonia Dondale & Redner, 1984 — USA, Mexico
- Pardosa saltuaria (L. Koch, 1870) — Central Europe to Kazakhstan
- Pardosa saltuarides (Strand, 1908) — Ethiopia
- Pardosa sangzhiensis Yin et al., 1995 — China
- Pardosa sanmenensis Yu & Song, 1988 — China
- Pardosa santamaria Barrion & Litsinger, 1995 — Philippines
- Pardosa saturatior Simon, 1937 — Central Europe
- Pardosa saxatilis (Hentz, 1844) — USA, Canada
- Pardosa schenkeli Lessert, 1904 — Palearctic
- Pardosa schreineri Purcell, 1903 — South Africa
- Pardosa schubotzi (Strand, 1913) — Central, East Africa
- Pardosa selengensis (Odenwall, 1901) — Russia, Mongolia
- Pardosa semicana Simon, 1885 — Sri Lanka, Malaysia, China
- Pardosa septentrionalis (Westring, 1861) — Northern Palearctic
- Pardosa serena (L. Koch, 1875) — Egypt
- Pardosa shuangjiangensis Yin et al., 1997 — China
- Pardosa shugangensis Yin, Bao & Peng, 1997 — China
- Pardosa shyamae (Tikader, 1970) — India, Bangladesh, China
- Pardosa sibiniformis Tang, Urita & Song, 1995 — China
- Pardosa sichuanensis Yu & Song, 1991 — China
- Pardosa sierra Banks, 1898 — Mexico
- Pardosa silvarum Hu, 2001 — China
- Pardosa sinensis Yin et al., 1995 — China
- Pardosa sinistra (Thorell, 1877) — USA, Canada
- Pardosa soccata Yu & Song, 1988 — China
- Pardosa socorroensis Jimenez, 1991 — Mexico
- Pardosa sodalis Holm, 1970 — Canada, Alaska, Russia
- Pardosa songosa Tikader & Malhotra, 1976 — India, Bangladesh, China
- Pardosa sordidata (Thorell, 1875) — Palearctic
- Pardosa sordidecolorata (Strand, 1906) — Ethiopia
- Pardosa sowerbyi Hogg, 1912 — China
- Pardosa sphagnicola (Dahl, 1908) — Europe, Russia
- Pardosa stellata (O. P.-Cambridge, 1885) — Central Asia
- Pardosa sternalis (Thorell, 1877) — North America
- Pardosa steva Lowrie & Gertsch, 1955 — North America
- Pardosa straeleni Roewer, 1959 — Congo
- Pardosa strandembriki Caporiacco, 1949 — Ethiopia
- Pardosa strena Yu & Song, 1988 — China
- Pardosa strigata Yu & Song, 1988 — China
- Pardosa strix (Holmberg, 1876) — Argentina
- Pardosa subalpina Schenkel, 1918 — Switzerland
- Pardosa subanchoroides Wang & Song, 1993 — China
- Pardosa subproximella (Strand, 1906) — Ethiopia
- Pardosa subsordidatula (Strand, 1915) — Israel
- Pardosa suchismitae Majumder, 2004 — India
- Pardosa sumatrana (Thorell, 1890) — India, China to Philippines, Sulawesi
- Pardosa sura Chamberlin & Ivie, 1941 — USA, Mexico
- Pardosa sutherlandi (Gravely, 1924) — India, Nepal
- Pardosa suwai Tanaka, 1985 — Russia, China, Japan
- Pardosa svatoni Marusik, Nadolny & Omelko, 2013 — Kazakhstan
- Pardosa taczanowskii (Thorell, 1875) — Russia, Mongolia, China
- Pardosa takahashii (Saito, 1936) — China, Taiwan, Japan, Okinawa
- Pardosa tangana Roewer, 1959 — Tanzania
- Pardosa tappaensis Gajbe, 2004 — India
- Pardosa tasevi Buchar, 1968 — Eastern Europe, Russia, Turkey, Azerbaijan
- Pardosa tatarica (Thorell, 1875) — Palearctic
  - Pardosa tatarica ligurica Simon, 1937 — Italy
  - Pardosa tatarica saturiator Caporiacco, 1948 — Greece
- Pardosa tenera Thorell, 1899 — Cameroon
- Pardosa tenuipes L. Koch, 1882 — Balearic Islands
- Pardosa tesquorum (Odenwall, 1901) — Russia, Mongolia, China, USA, Canada, Alaska
- Pardosa tesquorumoides Song & Yu, 1990 — China
- Pardosa tetonensis Gertsch, 1933 — USA
- Pardosa thalassia (Thorell, 1891) — Nicobar Islands
- Pardosa thompsoni Alderweireldt & Jocque, 1992 — East Africa
- Pardosa thorelli (Collett, 1876) — Norway
- Pardosa tikaderi Arora & Monga, 1994 — India
- Pardosa timidula (Roewer, 1951) — Yemen, Sri Lanka, Pakistan
- Pardosa torrentum Simon, 1876 — Europe, Georgia
  - Pardosa torrentum integra Denis, 1950 — France
- Pardosa trailli (O. P.-Cambridge, 1873) — Britain, Scandinavia
- Pardosa tricuspidata Tullgren, 1905 — Argentina
- Pardosa tridentis Caporiacco, 1935 — India, Nepal, Kashmir
- Pardosa trifoveata (Strand, 1907) — China
- Pardosa tristicella (Roewer, 1951) — Colombia
- Pardosa tristiculella (Roewer, 1951) — Myanmar
- Pardosa trottai Ballarin et al., 2012 — Kyrgyzstan
- Pardosa tschekiangiensis Schenkel, 1963 — China
- Pardosa tumida Barnes, 1959 — Mexico
- Pardosa tuoba Chamberlin, 1919 — USA
- Pardosa turkestanica (Roewer, 1951) — Russia, Central Asia
- Pardosa tyshchenkoi Zyuzin & Marusik, 1989 — Russia
- Pardosa uiensis Esyunin, 1996 — Russia
- Pardosa uintana Gertsch, 1933 — USA, Canada, Alaska
- Pardosa umtalica Purcell, 1903 — Southern Africa
- Pardosa uncata (Thorell, 1877) — USA
- Pardosa uncifera Schenkel, 1963 — Russia, China, Korea
- Pardosa unciferodies Qu, Peng & Yin, 2010 — China
- Pardosa unguifera F. O. P.-Cambridge, 1902 — Mexico, Guatemala
- Pardosa upembensis (Roewer, 1959) — Congo
- Pardosa utahensis Chamberlin, 1919 — USA
- Pardosa vadosa Barnes, 1959 — USA, Mexico
- Pardosa vagula (Thorell, 1890) — Sumatra, Mentawai Islands, Simeulue, Java
- Pardosa valens Barnes, 1959 — USA, Mexico
- Pardosa valida Banks, 1893 — Sierra Leone, Congo
- Pardosa vancouveri Emerton, 1917 — USA, Canada
- Pardosa vatovae Caporiacco, 1940 — Ethiopia
- Pardosa verticillifer (Strand, 1906) — Ethiopia
- Pardosa vindex (O. P.-Cambridge, 1885) — Yarkand
- Pardosa vindicata (O. P.-Cambridge, 1885) — Yarkand, Karakorum
- Pardosa vinsoni (Roewer, 1951) — Madagascar
- Pardosa virgata Kulczynski, 1901 — Mongolia
- Pardosa vittata (Keyserling, 1863) — Europe to Georgia
- Pardosa vlijmi den Hollander & Dijkstra, 1974 — France
- Pardosa vogelae Kronestedt, 1993 — USA
- Pardosa v-signata Soares & Camargo, 1948 — Brazil
- Pardosa vulvitecta Schenkel, 1936 — China
- Pardosa wagleri (Hahn, 1822) — Palearctic
  - Pardosa wagleri atra (Giebel, 1869) — Europe
- Pardosa warayensis Barrion & Litsinger, 1995 — Philippines
- Pardosa wasatchensis Gertsch, 1933 — USA
- Pardosa wuyiensis Yu & Song, 1988 — China
- Pardosa wyuta Gertsch, 1934 — USA, Canada
- Pardosa xerampelina (Keyserling, 1877) — USA, Canada, Alaska
- Pardosa xerophila Vogel, 1964 — USA, Mexico
- Pardosa xinjiangensis Hu & Wu, 1989 — China
- Pardosa yadongensis Hu & Li, 1987 — China
- Pardosa yaginumai Tanaka, 1977 — Japan
- Pardosa yamanoi Tanaka & Suwa, 1986 — Japan
- Pardosa yavapa Chamberlin, 1925 — USA
- Pardosa yongduensis Kim & Chae, 2012 — Korea
- Pardosa zhangi Song & Haupt, 1995 — China
- Pardosa zhui Yu & Song, 1988 — China
- Pardosa zionis Chamberlin & Ivie, 1942 — USA, Mexico
- Pardosa zonsteini Ballarin et al., 2012 — Central Asia
- Pardosa zorimorpha (Strand, 1907) — Madagascar
- Pardosa zuojiani Song & Haupt, 1995 — China
- Pardosa zyuzini Kronestedt & Marusik, 2011 — Russia, Mongolia

== Pardosella ==
Pardosella Caporiacco, 1939

- Pardosella delesserti Caporiacco, 1939 — Ethiopia
- Pardosella maculata Caporiacco, 1941 — Ethiopia
- Pardosella massaiensis Roewer, 1959 — Tanzania
- Pardosella tabora Roewer, 1959 — Tanzania
- Pardosella zavattarii Caporiacco, 1939 — Ethiopia

== Passiena ==
Passiena Thorell, 1890

- Passiena albipalpis Roewer, 1959 — Cameroon
- Passiena auberti (Simon, 1898) — South Africa
- Passiena spinicrus Thorell, 1890 — Malaysia, Borneo
- Passiena torbjoerni Lehtinen, 2005 — Thailand

== Pavocosa ==
Pavocosa Roewer, 1960

- Pavocosa feisica (Strand, 1915) — Caroline Islands
- Pavocosa gallopavo (Mello-Leitao, 1941) — Argentina
- Pavocosa herteli (Mello-Leitao, 1947) — Brazil
- Pavocosa langei (Mello-Leitao, 1947) — Brazil
- Pavocosa siamensis (Giebel, 1863) — Thailand

== Phonophilus ==
Phonophilus Ehrenberg, 1831

- Phonophilus portentosus Ehrenberg, 1831 — Libya

== Pirata ==
Pirata Sundevall, 1833

- Pirata abalosi (Mello-Leitao, 1942) — Argentina
- Pirata affinis Roewer, 1960 — Congo
- Pirata africana (Roewer, 1960) — Namibia
- Pirata alachuus Gertsch & Wallace, 1935 — USA
- Pirata albicomaculatus Franganillo, 1913 — Spain
- Pirata allapahae Gertsch, 1940 — USA
- Pirata apalacheus Gertsch, 1940 — USA
- Pirata aspirans Chamberlin, 1904 — USA, Canada
- Pirata brevipes (Banks, 1893) — Congo
- Pirata browni Gertsch & Davis, 1940 — Mexico
- Pirata bryantae Kurata, 1944 — Canada, Alaska
- Pirata cereipes (L. Koch, 1878) — Central Asia
- Pirata chamberlini (Lessert, 1927) — Congo, East Africa
- Pirata coreanus Paik, 1991 — Korea
- Pirata davisi Wallace & Exline, 1978 — USA, Mexico
- Pirata digitatus Tso & Chen, 2004 — Taiwan
- Pirata felix O. P.-Cambridge, 1898 — Mexico
- Pirata hiteorum Wallace & Exline, 1978 — USA
- Pirata indigenus Wallace & Exline, 1978 — USA
- Pirata iviei Wallace & Exline, 1978 — USA
- Pirata mayaca Gertsch, 1940 — USA, Bahama Islands, Cuba
- Pirata molensis (Strand, 1908) — Ethiopia
- Pirata montanoides Banks, 1892 — USA
- Pirata montanus Emerton, 1885 — USA, Canada, Russia
- Pirata nanatus Gertsch, 1940 — USA
- Pirata niokolona Roewer, 1961 — Senegal
- Pirata pagicola Chamberlin, 1925 — Mexico to Panama
- Pirata pallipes (Blackwall, 1857) — Algeria
- Pirata piratellus (Strand, 1907) — Japan
- Pirata piraticus (Clerck, 1757) — Holarctic
- Pirata piratimorphus (Strand, 1908) — USA
- Pirata piscatorius (Clerck, 1757) — Palearctic
- Pirata praedo Kulczynski, 1885 — Russia, Japan, USA, Canada
- Pirata proximus O. P.-Cambridge, 1876 — Egypt
- Pirata rubicundicoloratus (Strand, 1906) — Algeria
- Pirata sagitta (Mello-Leitao, 1941) — Argentina
- Pirata sedentarius Montgomery, 1904 — North America, Greater Antilles
- Pirata seminolus Gertsch & Wallace, 1935 — USA
- Pirata soukupi (Mello-Leitao, 1942) — Peru
- Pirata spatulatus Chai, 1985 — China
- Pirata spiniger (Simon, 1898) — USA
- Pirata subannulipes (Strand, 1906) — Ethiopia
- Pirata subniger Franganillo, 1913 — Spain
- Pirata subpiraticus (Bösenberg & Strand, 1906) — Russia, Korea, China, Japan, Java, Philippines
- Pirata suwaneus Gertsch, 1940 — USA, Bahama Islands
- Pirata sylvanus Chamberlin & Ivie, 1944 — USA
- Pirata taurirtensis (Schenkel, 1937) — Morocco
- Pirata tenuitarsis Simon, 1876 — Europe to Mongolia
- Pirata timidus (Lucas, 1846) — Algeria
- Pirata trepidus Roewer, 1960 — Namibia
- Pirata triens Wallace & Exline, 1978 — USA
- Pirata turrialbicus Wallace & Exline, 1978 — Costa Rica, Panama, Cuba
- Pirata uliginosus (Thorell, 1856) — Europe, Russia
- Pirata velox Keyserling, 1891 — Brazil
- Pirata veracruzae Gertsch & Davis, 1940 — Mexico
- Pirata welakae Wallace & Exline, 1978 — USA
- Pirata werneri (Roewer, 1960) — Morocco
- Pirata zavattarii (Caporiacco, 1941) — Ethiopia

== Piratula ==
Piratula Roewer, 1960

- Piratula borea (Tanaka, 1974) — Russia, China, Japan
- Piratula canadensis (Dondale & Redner, 1981) — Russia, Canada
- Piratula cantralli (Wallace & Exline, 1978) — USA, Canada
- Piratula clercki (Bösenberg & Strand, 1906) — China, Korea, Taiwan, Japan
- Piratula denticulata (Liu, 1987) — Russia, China, Taiwan
- Piratula gigantea (Gertsch, 1934) — USA
- Piratula hiroshii (Tanaka, 1986) — Japan
- Piratula hokkaidensis (Tanaka, 2003) — Japan
- Piratula hurkai (Buchar, 1966) — Ukraine, Russia, Georgia, Abkhazia
- Piratula hygrophila (Thorell, 1872) — Palearctic
- Piratula insularis (Emerton, 1885) — Holarctic
- Piratula iriomotensis (Tanaka, 1989) — Ryukyu Islands
- Piratula knorri (Scopoli, 1763) — Palearctic
- Piratula latitans (Blackwall, 1841) — Europe to Azerbaijan
- Piratula logunovi Omelko, Marusik & Koponen, 2011 — Russia
- Piratula longjiangensis (Yan et al., 1997) — China
- Piratula meridionalis (Tanaka, 1974) — China, Korea, Japan
- Piratula minuta (Emerton, 1885) — North America
- Piratula montigena (Liu, 1987) — China
- Piratula piratoides (Bösenberg & Strand, 1906) — Russia, Korea, China, Japan
- Piratula procurva (Bösenberg & Strand, 1906) — China, Korea, Japan
- Piratula serrulata (Song & Wang, 1984) — Russia, China
- Piratula tanakai (Brignoli, 1983) — Russia, Korea, Japan
- Piratula tenuisetacea (Chai, 1987) — China
- Piratula yaginumai (Tanaka, 1974) — Russia, China, Korea, Japan
- Piratula yesoensis (Tanaka, 1985) — Japan

== Proevippa ==
Proevippa Purcell, 1903

- Proevippa albiventris (Simon, 1898) — Namibia, South Africa
- Proevippa biampliata (Purcell, 1903) — South Africa
- Proevippa bruneipes (Purcell, 1903) — South Africa
- Proevippa dregei (Purcell, 1903) — South Africa
- Proevippa eberlanzi (Roewer, 1959) — Namibia
- Proevippa fascicularis (Purcell, 1903) — South Africa
- Proevippa hirsuta (Russell-Smith, 1981) — South Africa
- Proevippa lightfooti Purcell, 1903 — South Africa
- Proevippa schreineri (Purcell, 1903) — South Africa
- Proevippa unicolor (Roewer, 1960) — Congo
- Proevippa wanlessi (Russell-Smith, 1981) — South Africa

== Prolycosides ==
Prolycosides Mello-Leitao, 1942

- Prolycosides amblygyna (Mello-Leitao, 1942) — Argentina

== Pseudevippa ==
Pseudevippa Simon, 1910

- Pseudevippa cana Simon, 1910 — Namibia

== Pterartoria ==
Pterartoria Purcell, 1903

- Pterartoria arbuscula (Purcell, 1903) — South Africa
- Pterartoria fissivittata Purcell, 1903 — South Africa
- Pterartoria flavolimbata Purcell, 1903 — South Africa
- Pterartoria masarangi (Merian, 1911) — Sulawesi
- Pterartoria polysticta Purcell, 1903 — South Africa

== Pterartoriola ==
Pterartoriola Roewer, 1959

- Pterartoriola caldaria (Purcell, 1903) — South Africa
- Pterartoriola lativittata (Purcell, 1903) — South Africa
- Pterartoriola lompobattangi (Merian, 1911) — Sulawesi
- Pterartoriola sagae (Purcell, 1903) — South Africa
- Pterartoriola subcrucifera (Purcell, 1903) — South Africa

== Pyrenecosa ==
Pyrenecosa Marusik, Azarkina & Koponen, 2004

- Pyrenecosa pyrenaea (Simon, 1876) — France
- Pyrenecosa rupicola (Dufour, 1821) — Spain, France, Switzerland
- Pyrenecosa spinosa (Denis, 1938) — Andorra

== Rabidosa ==
Rabidosa Roewer, 1960

- Rabidosa carrana (Bryant, 1934) — USA
- Rabidosa hentzi (Banks, 1904) — USA
- Rabidosa punctulata (Hentz, 1844) — USA
- Rabidosa rabida (Walckenaer, 1837) — North America
- Rabidosa santrita (Chamberlin & Ivie, 1942) — USA

== Satta ==
Satta Lehtinen & Hippa, 1979

- Satta cannibalorum Lehtinen & Hippa, 1979 — New Guinea

== Schizocosa ==
Schizocosa Chamberlin, 1904

- Schizocosa altamontis (Chamberlin, 1916) — Peru
- Schizocosa arua (Strand, 1911) — Aru Islands
- Schizocosa astuta (Roewer, 1959) — Tanzania
- Schizocosa aulonia Dondale, 1969 — USA
- Schizocosa avida (Walckenaer, 1837) — North America
- Schizocosa bilineata (Emerton, 1885) — USA, Canada
- Schizocosa cecili (Pocock, 1901) — Zimbabwe
- Schizocosa ceratiola (Gertsch & Wallace, 1935) — USA (Florida)
- Schizocosa cespitum Dondale & Redner, 1978 — Canada
- Schizocosa chelifasciata (Mello-Leitao, 1943) — Brazil
- Schizocosa chiricahua Dondale & Redner, 1978 — USA
- Schizocosa communis (Emerton, 1885) — USA, Canada
- Schizocosa concolor (Caporiacco, 1935) — Karakorum
- Schizocosa conspicua (Roewer, 1959) — Rwanda
- Schizocosa cotabatoana Barrion & Litsinger, 1995 — Philippines
- Schizocosa crassipalpata Roewer, 1951 — USA, Canada
- Schizocosa crassipes (Walckenaer, 1837) — USA
- Schizocosa darlingi (Pocock, 1898) — Southern Africa
- Schizocosa duplex Chamberlin, 1925 — USA
- Schizocosa ehni (Lessert, 1933) — Angola
- Schizocosa floridana Bryant, 1934 — USA
- Schizocosa fragilis (Thorell, 1890) — Sumatra
- Schizocosa hebes (O. P.-Cambridge, 1885) — Yarkand
- Schizocosa hewitti (Lessert, 1915) — East Africa
- Schizocosa humilis (Banks, 1892) — USA, Canada
- Schizocosa incerta (Bryant, 1934) — USA
- Schizocosa interjecta (Roewer, 1959) — Tanzania
- Schizocosa malitiosa (Tullgren, 1905) — Bolivia, Argentina, Uruguay
- Schizocosa maxima Dondale & Redner, 1978 — USA
- Schizocosa mccooki (Montgomery, 1904) — Canada, USA, Mexico
- Schizocosa mimula (Gertsch, 1934) — USA, Mexico
- Schizocosa minahassae (Merian, 1911) — Sulawesi
- Schizocosa minnesotensis (Gertsch, 1934) — USA, Canada
- Schizocosa minor (Lessert, 1926) — East Africa
- Schizocosa obscoena (Rainbow, 1899) — New Hebrides
- Schizocosa ocreata (Hentz, 1844) — North America
- Schizocosa parricida (Karsch, 1881) — China
- Schizocosa perplexa Bryant, 1936 — USA
- Schizocosa pilipes (Karsch, 1879) — West, Central Africa
- Schizocosa proletaria (Tullgren, 1905) — Bolivia, Argentina
- Schizocosa puebla Chamberlin, 1925 — USA
- Schizocosa retrorsa (Banks, 1911) — USA, Mexico
- Schizocosa rovneri Uetz & Dondale, 1979 — USA
- Schizocosa rubiginea (O. P.-Cambridge, 1885) — Yarkand
- Schizocosa salara (Roewer, 1960) — Afghanistan
- Schizocosa salsa Barnes, 1953 — USA
- Schizocosa saltatrix (Hentz, 1844) — North America
- Schizocosa segregata Gertsch & Wallace, 1937 — USA
- Schizocosa semiargentea (Simon, 1898) — Peru
- Schizocosa serranoi (Mello-Leitao, 1941) — Brazil, Argentina
- Schizocosa stridulans Stratton, 1984 — USA
- Schizocosa subpersonata (Simon, 1910) — Namibia
- Schizocosa tamae (Gertsch & Davis, 1940) — Mexico
- Schizocosa tenera (Karsch, 1879) — West, Central Africa
- Schizocosa tristani (Banks, 1909) — Costa Rica, Panama
- Schizocosa uetzi Stratton, 1997 — USA
- Schizocosa venusta (Roewer, 1959) — Tanzania
- Schizocosa vulpecula (L. Koch, 1865) — Wallis Islands

== Shapna ==
Shapna Hippa & Lehtinen, 1983

- Shapna pluvialis Hippa & Lehtinen, 1983 — India

== Sibirocosa ==
Sibirocosa Marusik, Azarkina & Koponen, 2004

- Sibirocosa kolymensis Marusik, Azarkina & Koponen, 2004 — Russia
- Sibirocosa koponeni Omelko & Marusik, 2013 — Russia
- Sibirocosa manchurica Marusik, Azarkina & Koponen, 2004 — Russia
- Sibirocosa nadolnyi Omelko & Marusik, 2013 — Russia
- Sibirocosa sibirica (Kulczynski, 1908) — Russia
- Sibirocosa subsolana (Kulczynski, 1907) — Russia
- Sibirocosa trilikauskasi Omelko & Marusik, 2013 — Russia

== Sosippus ==
Sosippus Simon, 1888

- Sosippus agalenoides Banks, 1909 — Mexico to Costa Rica
- Sosippus californicus Simon, 1898 — USA, Mexico
- Sosippus floridanus Simon, 1898 — USA
- Sosippus janus Brady, 1972 — USA
- Sosippus mexicanus Simon, 1888 — Mexico, Guatemala
- Sosippus michoacanus Brady, 1962 — Mexico
- Sosippus mimus Chamberlin, 1924 — USA
- Sosippus placidus Brady, 1972 — USA
- Sosippus plutonus Brady, 1962 — Mexico
- Sosippus texanus Brady, 1962 — USA

== Syroloma ==
Syroloma Simon, 1900

- Syroloma major Simon, 1900 — Hawaii
- Syroloma minor Simon, 1900 — Hawaii

== Tapetosa ==
Tapetosa Framenau et al., 2009

- Tapetosa darwini Framenau et al., 2009 — Western Australia

== Tasmanicosa ==
Tasmanicosa Roewer, 1959

- Tasmanicosa tasmanica (Hogg, 1905) — Tasmania

== Tetralycosa ==
Tetralycosa Roewer, 1960

- Tetralycosa alteripa (McKay, 1976) — Western Australia
- Tetralycosa arabanae Framenau, Gotch & Austin, 2006 — South Australia
- Tetralycosa eyrei (Hickman, 1944) — South Australia, Victoria
- Tetralycosa oraria (L. Koch, 1876) — Southern Australia, Tasmania

== Tigrosa ==
Tigrosa Brady, 2012

- Tigrosa annexa (Chamberlin & Ivie, 1944) — USA
- Tigrosa aspersa (Hentz, 1844) — USA, Canada
- Tigrosa georgicola (Walckenaer, 1837) — USA
- Tigrosa grandis (Banks, 1894) — USA
- Tigrosa helluo (Walckenaer, 1837) — USA, Canada

== Trabea ==
Trabea Simon, 1876

- Trabea bipunctata (Roewer, 1959) — Congo, Rwanda, Malawi, Ethiopia
- Trabea cazorla Snazell, 1983 — Spain, Morocco, Algeria
- Trabea heteroculata Strand, 1913 — Rwanda, Tanzania, Kenya
- Trabea natalensis Russell-Smith, 1982 — South Africa
- Trabea nigriceps Purcell, 1903 — South Africa
- Trabea nigristernis Alderweireldt, 1999 — Malawi
- Trabea ornatipalpis Russell-Smith, 1982 — South Africa
- Trabea paradoxa Simon, 1876 — Southern Europe, Turkey
- Trabea purcelli Roewer, 1951 — South Africa
- Trabea rubriceps Lawrence, 1952 — South Africa
- Trabea setula Alderweireldt, 1999 — Malawi
- Trabea unicolor Purcell, 1903 — South Africa
- Trabea varia Purcell, 1903 — South Africa

== Trabeops ==
Trabeops Roewer, 1959

- Trabeops aurantiacus (Emerton, 1885) — USA, Canada

== Trebacosa ==
Trebacosa Dondale & Redner, 1981

- Trebacosa europaea Szinetar & Kancsal, 2007 (syn. Trebacosa brunhesi) — Hungary
- Trebacosa marxi (Stone, 1890) — USA, Canada

== Tricassa ==
Tricassa Simon, 1910

- Tricassa deserticola Simon, 1910 — Namibia, South Africa
- Tricassa madagascariensis Jocque & Alderweireldt, 2001 — Madagascar

== Trochosa ==
Trochosa C. L. Koch, 1847

- Trochosa abdita (Gertsch, 1934) — USA
- Trochosa adjacens O. P.-Cambridge, 1885 — Yarkand
- Trochosa albifrons (Roewer, 1960) — Congo
- Trochosa albipilosa (Roewer, 1960) — South Africa
- Trochosa albomarginata (Roewer, 1960) — Zimbabwe
- Trochosa albopunctata (Mello-Leitao, 1941) — Argentina
- Trochosa altera (Roewer, 1955) — Iran
- Trochosa alviolai Barrion & Litsinger, 1995 — Philippines
- Trochosa annulipes L. Koch, 1875 — Libya, Egypt, Ethiopia
- Trochosa aperta (Roewer, 1960) — Namibia
- Trochosa aquatica Tanaka, 1985 — China, Japan
- Trochosa arctosina Caporiacco, 1947 — Venezuela, Guyana
- Trochosa bannaensis Yin & Chen, 1995 — China
- Trochosa beltran (Mello-Leitao, 1942) — Argentina
- Trochosa bukobae (Strand, 1916) — East Africa
- Trochosa cachetiensis Mcheidze, 1997 — Georgia
- Trochosa canapii Barrion & Litsinger, 1995 — Philippines
- Trochosa charmina (Strand, 1916) — Cameroon
- Trochosa corporaali (Reimoser, 1935) — China
- Trochosa dentichelis Buchar, 1997 — Bhutan
- Trochosa entebbensis (Lessert, 1915) — Central, East Africa
- Trochosa fabella (Karsch, 1879) — West, Central Africa
- Trochosa fageli Roewer, 1960 — Congo
- Trochosa garamantica (Caporiacco, 1936) — Libya
- Trochosa gentilis (Roewer, 1960) — Cameroon
- Trochosa glarea McKay, 1979 — Queensland
- Trochosa gravelyi Buchar, 1976 — Nepal
- Trochosa guatemala Chamberlin & Ivie, 1942 — Guatemala
- Trochosa gunturensis Patel & Reddy, 1993 — India
- Trochosa himalayensis Tikader & Malhotra, 1980 — India
- Trochosa hirtipes Ponomarev, 2009 — Russia
- Trochosa hispanica Simon, 1870 — Mediterranean to Central Asia
- Trochosa hoggi (Lessert, 1926) — East Africa
- Trochosa hungarica Herman, 1879 — Hungary
- Trochosa immaculata Savelyeva, 1972 — Kazakhstan
- Trochosa impercussa Roewer, 1955 — Iran
- Trochosa infausta (Mello-Leitao, 1941) — Argentina
- Trochosa insignis O. P.-Cambridge, 1898 — Costa Rica
- Trochosa intermedia (Roewer, 1960) — Zimbabwe
- Trochosa iviei (Gertsch & Wallace, 1937) — Mexico
- Trochosa joshidana (Kishida, 1909) — Japan
- Trochosa kaieteurensis (Gertsch & Wallace, 1937) — Guyana
- Trochosa kalukanai (Simon, 1900) — Hawaii
- Trochosa liberiana (Roewer, 1960) — Liberia
- Trochosa longa Qu, Peng & Yin, 2010 — China
- Trochosa lucasi (Roewer, 1951) — Canary Islands
- Trochosa lugubris O. P.-Cambridge, 1885 — Tajikistan
- Trochosa magdalenensis (Strand, 1914) — Colombia
- Trochosa magna (Roewer, 1960) — Liberia
- Trochosa masumbica (Strand, 1916) — East Africa
- Trochosa melloi Roewer, 1951 — Brazil
- Trochosa menglaensis Yin, Bao & Wang, 1995 — China
- Trochosa minima (Roewer, 1960) — Congo, Kenya
- Trochosa moluccensis Thorell, 1878 — Amboina
- Trochosa mossambicus (Roewer, 1960) — Mozambique
- Trochosa mundamea Roewer, 1960 — Cameroon, Sierra Leone
- Trochosa niveopilosa (Mello-Leitao, 1938) — Argentina
- Trochosa obscura (Roewer, 1960) — Rwanda
- Trochosa ochracea (L. Koch, 1856) — Spain
- Trochosa papakula (Strand, 1911) — Moluccas, New Guinea
- Trochosa paranaensis (Mello-Leitao, 1937) — Brazil
- Trochosa pardaloides (Mello-Leitao, 1937) — Brazil
- Trochosa parviguttata (Strand, 1906) — Ethiopia
- Trochosa pelengena (Roewer, 1960) — Congo
- Trochosa persica (Roewer, 1955) — Iran
- Trochosa phyllis (Hogg, 1905) — South Australia
- Trochosa praetecta L. Koch, 1875 — Ethiopia
- Trochosa presumptuosa (Holmberg, 1876) — Argentina
- Trochosa propinqua O. P.-Cambridge, 1885 — Yarkand
- Trochosa pseudofurva (Strand, 1906) — Cameroon
- Trochosa punctipes (Gravely, 1924) — India
- Trochosa quinquefasciata Roewer, 1960 — Tanzania
- Trochosa reichardtiana (Strand, 1916) — Hispaniola
- Trochosa reimoseri Bristowe, 1931 — Krakatau
- Trochosa robusta (Simon, 1876) — Palearctic
- Trochosa ruandanica (Roewer, 1960) — Rwanda
- Trochosa ruricola (De Geer, 1778) — Holarctic, Bermuda
- Trochosa ruricoloides Schenkel, 1963 — China, Taiwan
- Trochosa sanlorenziana (Petrunkevitch, 1925) — Panama
- Trochosa semoni Simon, 1896 — Java
- Trochosa sepulchralis (Montgomery, 1902) — USA
- Trochosa sericea (Simon, 1898) — Brazil
- Trochosa spinipalpis (F. O. P.-Cambridge, 1895) — Palearctic
- Trochosa suiningensis Peng et al., 1997 — China
- Trochosa tangerana (Roewer, 1960) — Morocco
- Trochosa tenebrosa Keyserling, 1877 — Colombia
- Trochosa tenella Keyserling, 1877 — Colombia
- Trochosa tenuis (Roewer, 1960) — Ethiopia
- Trochosa terricola Thorell, 1856 — Holarctic
- Trochosa unmunsanensis Paik, 1994 — Korea
- Trochosa ursina (Schenkel, 1936) — China
- Trochosa vulvella (Strand, 1907) — Japan
- Trochosa werneri (Roewer, 1960) — Algeria
- Trochosa wuchangensis (Schenkel, 1963) — China
- Trochosa wundurra McKay, 1979 — Western Australia

== Trochosippa ==
Trochosippa Roewer, 1960

- Trochosippa eberlanzi Roewer, 1960 — Namibia
- Trochosippa eugeni (Roewer, 1951) — Namibia
- Trochosippa kaswabilengae Roewer, 1960 — Congo
- Trochosippa malayana (Doleschall, 1859) — Amboina
- Trochosippa meruensis (Lessert, 1926) — East Africa
- Trochosippa modesta Roewer, 1960 — South Africa
- Trochosippa nigerrima Roewer, 1960 — South Africa
- Trochosippa obscura (Mello-Leitao, 1943) — Argentina
- Trochosippa pardosella (Strand, 1906) — Ethiopia

== Tuberculosa ==
Tuberculosa Framenau & Yoo, 2006

- Tuberculosa austini Framenau & Yoo, 2006 — Queensland
- Tuberculosa harveyi Framenau & Yoo, 2006 — Northern Territory
- Tuberculosa hoggi (Framenau & Vink, 2001) — Queensland
- Tuberculosa monteithi Framenau & Yoo, 2006 — Queensland

== Varacosa ==
Varacosa Chamberlin & Ivie, 1942

- Varacosa apothetica (Wallace, 1947) — USA
- Varacosa avara (Keyserling, 1877) — USA, Canada
- Varacosa gosiuta (Chamberlin, 1908) — USA
- Varacosa hoffmannae Jimenez & Dondale, 1988 — Mexico
- Varacosa parthenus (Chamberlin, 1925) — USA
- Varacosa shenandoa (Chamberlin & Ivie, 1942) — USA, Canada

== Venator ==
Venator Hogg, 1900

- Venator marginatus Hogg, 1900 — Victoria
- Venator spenceri Hogg, 1900 — Victoria

== Venatrix ==
Venatrix Roewer, 1960

- Venatrix allopictiventris Framenau & Vink, 2001 — Queensland, New South Wales
- Venatrix amnicola Framenau, 2006 — Queensland, New South Wales, Victoria
- Venatrix archookoora Framenau & Vink, 2001 — Queensland
- Venatrix arenaris (Hogg, 1905) — Australia
- Venatrix australiensis Framenau & Vink, 2001 — Queensland, New South Wales
- Venatrix brisbanae (L. Koch, 1878) — Queensland, New South Wales
- Venatrix esposica Framenau & Vink, 2001 — Northern Territory, South Australia to Tasmania
- Venatrix fontis Framenau & Vink, 2001 — South Australia, New South Wales, Victoria
- Venatrix funesta (C. L. Koch, 1847) — Southeastern Australia, Tasmania
- Venatrix furcillata (L. Koch, 1867) — Queensland, New South Wales, Victoria, Tasmania
- Venatrix hickmani Framenau & Vink, 2001 — Queensland, New South Wales
- Venatrix konei (Berland, 1924) — Australia, Lord Howe Islands, New Zealand, New Caledonia
- Venatrix koori Framenau & Vink, 2001 — Victoria
- Venatrix kosciuskoensis (McKay, 1974) — New South Wales, Victoria
- Venatrix lapidosa (McKay, 1974) — Queensland, New South Wales, Victoria
- Venatrix magkasalubonga (Barrion & Litsinger, 1995) — Philippines
- Venatrix mckayi Framenau & Vink, 2001 — Southeastern Australia
- Venatrix ornatula (L. Koch, 1877) — Queensland, New South Wales
- Venatrix palau Framenau, 2006 — Micronesia, Palau Islands, Queensland
- Venatrix penola Framenau & Vink, 2001 — South Australia, Victoria
- Venatrix pictiventris (L. Koch, 1877) — Southeastern Australia, Tasmania
- Venatrix pseudospeciosa Framenau & Vink, 2001 — Southeastern Australia, Tasmania
- Venatrix pullastra (Simon, 1909) — Western Australia
- Venatrix roo Framenau & Vink, 2001 — South Australia
- Venatrix speciosa (L. Koch, 1877) — Eastern Australia
- Venatrix summa (McKay, 1974) — New South Wales
- Venatrix tinfos Framenau, 2006 — Western Australia

== Venonia ==
Venonia Thorell, 1894

- Venonia chaiwooi Yoo & Framenau, 2006 — Palau
- Venonia choiae Yoo & Framenau, 2006 — Sulawesi
- Venonia cinctipes (Simon, 1898) — New Guinea, Queensland
- Venonia coruscans Thorell, 1894 — Malaysia, Singapore, Borneo, Java
- Venonia infundibulum Yoo & Framenau, 2006 — Northern Territory
- Venonia joejim Yoo & Framenau, 2006 — Palau
- Venonia kimjoopili Yoo & Framenau, 2006 — Northern Territory
- Venonia kokoda Lehtinen & Hippa, 1979 — New Guinea
- Venonia micans (Simon, 1898) — Philippines, Bali, Sulawesi
- Venonia micarioides (L. Koch, 1877) — Australia
- Venonia milla Lehtinen & Hippa, 1979 — New Guinea
- Venonia muju (Chrysanthus, 1967) — New Guinea, New Britain
- Venonia nata Yoo & Framenau, 2006 — Queensland
- Venonia spirocysta Chai, 1991 — China, Taiwan
- Venonia sungahae Yoo & Framenau, 2006 — Northern Territory
- Venonia vilkkii Lehtinen & Hippa, 1979 — New Guinea, Queensland

== Vesubia ==
Vesubia Simon, 1910

- Vesubia caduca (Karsch, 1880) — Polynesia
- Vesubia jugorum (Simon, 1881) — Italy
- Vesubia vivax (Thorell, 1875) — Russia, Turkmenistan

== Wadicosa ==
Wadicosa Zyuzin, 1985

- Wadicosa benadira (Caporiacco, 1940) — Somalia, Kenya
- Wadicosa cognata Kronestedt, 2015 — Kenya
- Wadicosa commoventa Zyuzin, 1985 — Turkmenistan
- Wadicosa daliensis Yin, Peng & Zhang, 1997 — China
- Wadicosa fidelis (O. P.-Cambridge, 1872) — Palearctic, Canary Islands
- Wadicosa jocquei Kronestedt, 2015 — Seychelles, Comoro Is., Madagascar, Mauritius
- Wadicosa okinawensis (Tanaka, 1985) — Ryukyu Islands
- Wadicosa oncka (Lawrence, 1927) — Africa
- Wadicosa prasantae Ahmed et al., 2014 — Africa
- Wadicosa quadrifera (Gravely, 1924) — India, Sri Lanka
- Wadicosa russellsmithi Kronestedt, 2015 — Mauritius

== Xerolycosa ==
Xerolycosa Dahl, 1908

- Xerolycosa miniata (C. L. Koch, 1834) — Palearctic
- Xerolycosa mongolica (Schenkel, 1963) — Russia, China
- Xerolycosa nemoralis (Westring, 1861) — Palearctic
- Xerolycosa sansibarina Roewer, 1960 — Zanzibar

== Zantheres ==
Zantheres Thorell, 1887

- Zantheres gracillimus Thorell, 1887 — Myanmar

== Zenonina ==
Zenonina Simon, 1898

- Zenonina albocaudata Lawrence, 1952 — South Africa
- Zenonina fusca Caporiacco, 1941 — Ethiopia
- Zenonina mystacina Simon, 1898 — Namibia, South Africa
- Zenonina rehfousi Lessert, 1933 — Angola
- Zenonina squamulata Strand, 1908 — Ethiopia
- Zenonina vestita Simon, 1898 — Ethiopia

== Zoica ==
Zoica Simon, 1898

- Zoica bambusicola Lehtinen & Hippa, 1979 — Thailand
- Zoica bolubolu Lehtinen & Hippa, 1979 — New Guinea
- Zoica carolinensis Framenau, Berry & Beatty, 2009 — Caroline Islands
- Zoica falcata Lehtinen & Hippa, 1979 — Borneo, New Guinea
- Zoica harduarae (Biswas & Roy, 2008) — India
- Zoica minuta (McKay, 1979) — Western Australia
- Zoica oculata Buchar, 1997 — Bhutan
- Zoica pacifica Framenau, Berry & Beatty, 2009 — Marshall Islands
- Zoica parvula (Thorell, 1895) — Sri Lanka, Myanmar, Thailand, Malaysia
- Zoica puellula (Simon, 1898) — India, Sri Lanka
- Zoica unciformis Li, Wang & Zhang, 2013 — China
- Zoica wauensis Lehtinen & Hippa, 1979 — New Guinea

== Zyuzicosa ==
Zyuzicosa Logunov, 2010

- Zyuzicosa afghana (Roewer, 1960) — Afghanistan
- Zyuzicosa andreii Fomichev, 2023 — Uzbekistan
- Zyuzicosa baisunica Logunov, 2010 — Uzbekistan
- Zyuzicosa fulviventris (Kroneberg, 1875) — Uzbekistan
- Zyuzicosa gigantea Logunov, 2010 — Uzbekistan
- Zyuzicosa kopetdaghensis Logunov, 2012 — Turkmenistan
- Zyuzicosa kvak Logunov, 2023 — Tajikistan
- Zyuzicosa laetabunda (Spassky, 1941) — Tajikistan
- Zyuzicosa nenjukovi (Spassky, 1952) — Tajikistan
- Zyuzicosa nessovi Logunov, 2012 — Kyrghyzstan
- Zyuzicosa turlanica Logunov, 2010 — Kazakhstan, Uzbekistan
- Zyuzicosa uzbekistanica Logunov, 2010 — Uzbekistan
