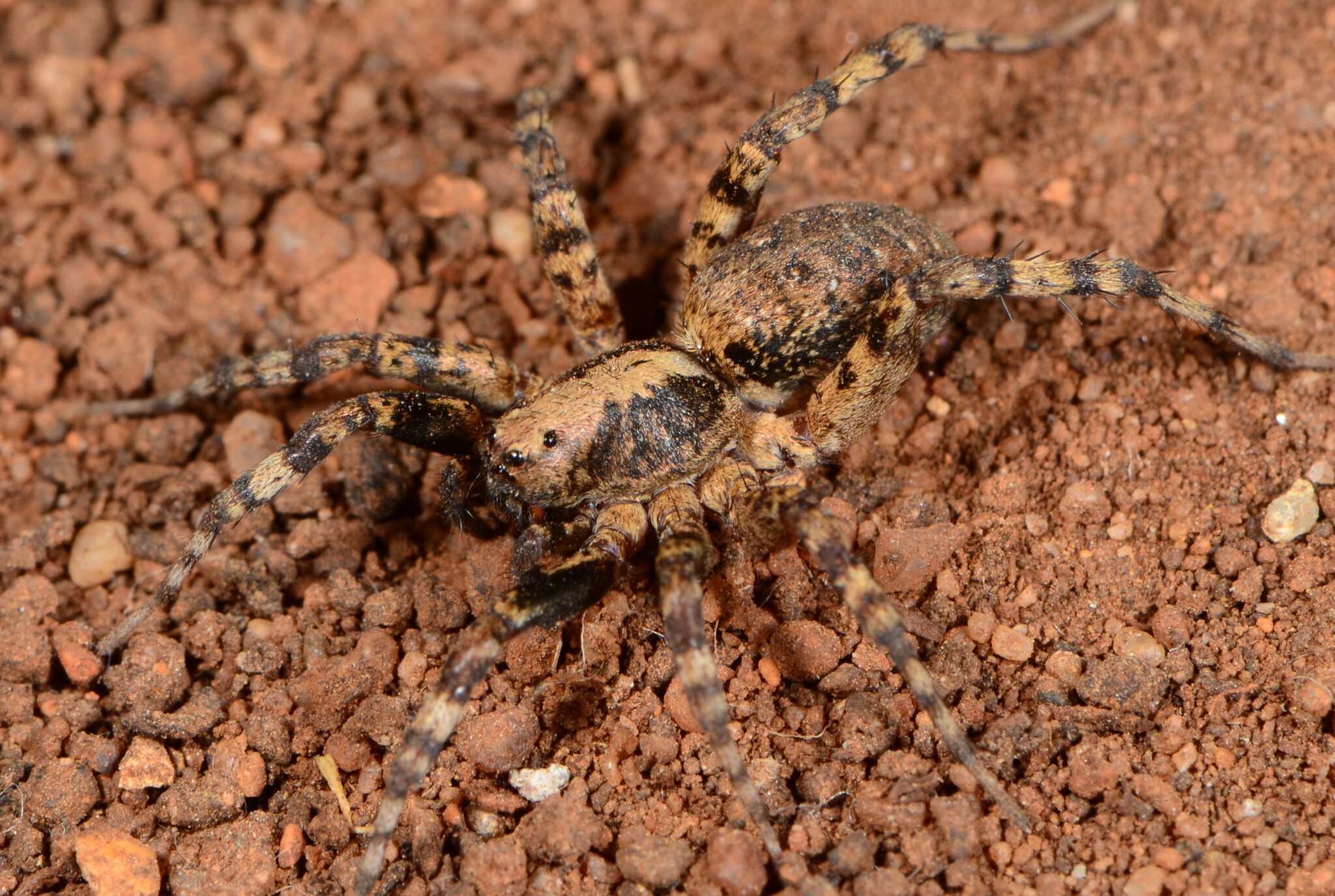
- male
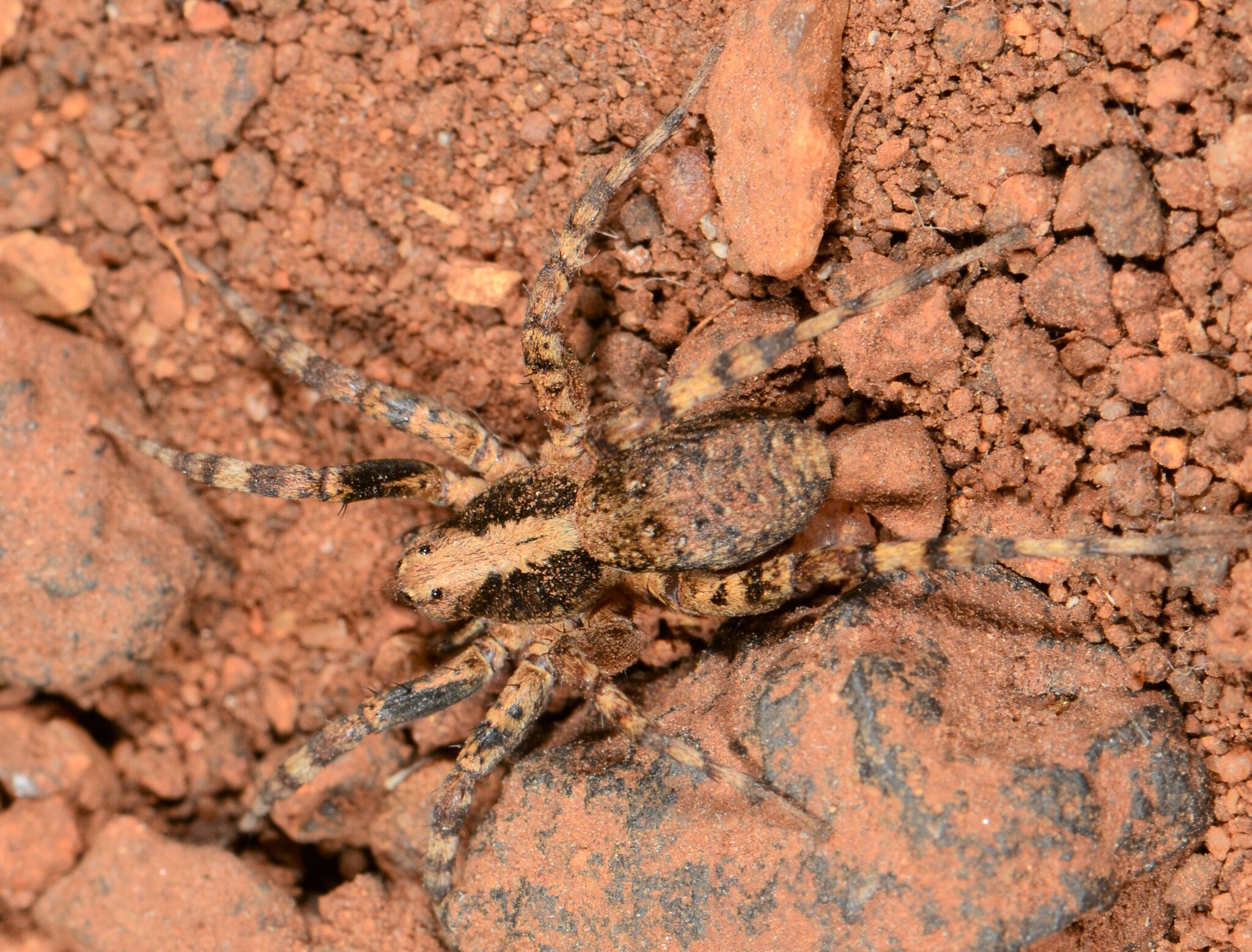
- male

Scientific classification
- Kingdom: Animalia
- Phylum: Arthropoda
- Subphylum: Chelicerata
- Class: Arachnida
- Order: Araneae
- Infraorder: Araneomorphae
- Family: Lycosidae
- Genus: Proevippa
- Species: P. schreineri

Binomial name
- Proevippa schreineri (Purcell, 1903)

Synonyms
- Anomalomma schreineri Purcell, 1903; Anomalomma bisinuata Purcell, 1903; Chaleposa bisinuata Roewer, 1955

= Proevippa schreineri =

Schreiner's Proevippa wolf spider

Species of spider

Proevippa schreineri is a species of spider in the family Lycosidae. It is found in southern Africa and is commonly known as Schreiner's Proevippa wolf spider.

== Distribution ==
Proevippa schreineri is found in Lesotho and South Africa. In South Africa, it is sampled from the provinces Eastern Cape, Free State, Gauteng, KwaZulu-Natal, Northern Cape, and Western Cape. The species occurs at altitudes ranging from 7 to 2,272 m. It has been recorded from numerous localities including Addo Elephant National Park, Golden Gate Highlands National Park, Sani Pass, Cederberg Wilderness Area, and many others.

== Habitat and ecology ==
Proevippa schreineri is a free-running ground dwelling spider sampled from the Fynbos, Grassland, Nama Karoo, Savanna, and Thicket biomes.

== Conservation ==
Proevippa schreineri is listed as Least Concern by the South African National Biodiversity Institute due to its wide geographical range. There are no significant threats to the species and it is protected in more than ten protected areas.

== Etymology ==
The species is named after S. C. Cronwright Schreiner.

== Taxonomy ==
Proevippa schreineri was originally described by Purcell in 1903 as Anomalomma schreineri from Hanover. Purcell also described Anomalomma bisinuata in the same publication, which was later synonymized with P. schreineri by Russell-Smith in 1981. The species was revised by Russell-Smith in 1981 and is known from both sexes.
