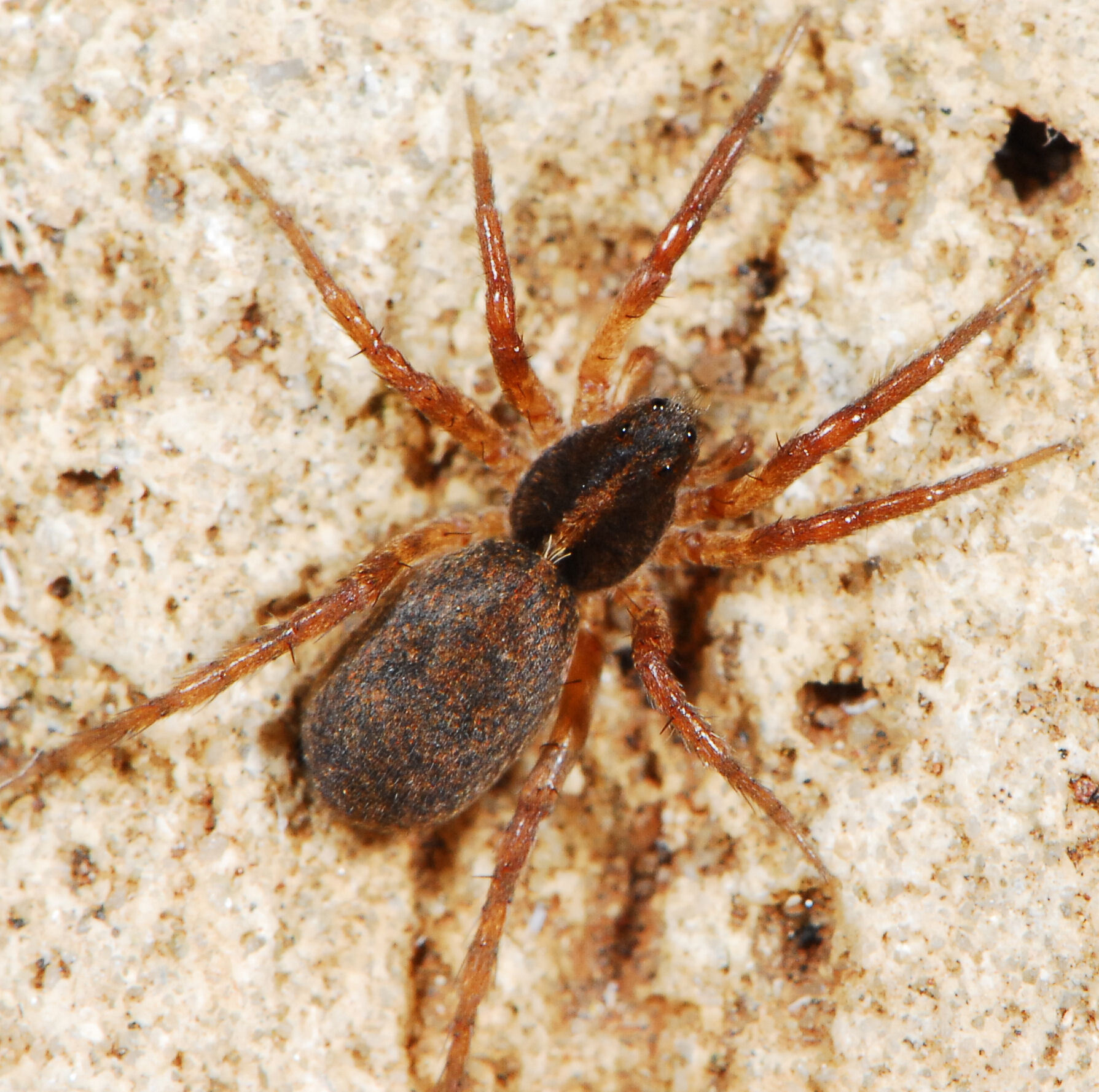
- female
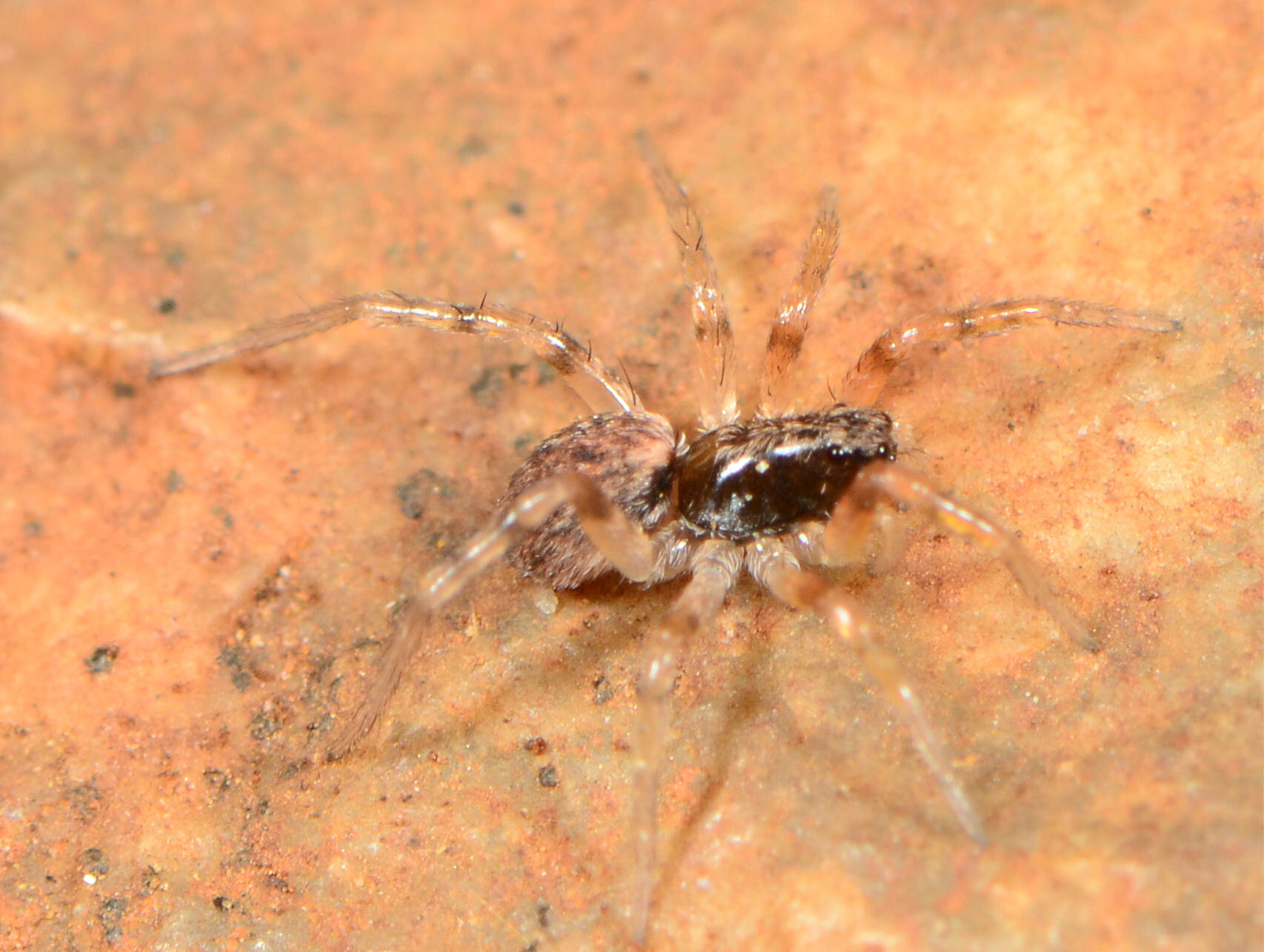
- juvenile female

Scientific classification
- Kingdom: Animalia
- Phylum: Arthropoda
- Subphylum: Chelicerata
- Class: Arachnida
- Order: Araneae
- Infraorder: Araneomorphae
- Family: Lycosidae
- Genus: Proevippa
- Species: P. albiventris

Binomial name
- Proevippa albiventris (Simon, 1898)

Synonyms
- Anomalomma albiventre Simon, 1898; Anomalomma coccineo-plumosum Simon, 1898; Chaleposa coccineoplumosa Simon, 1910

= Proevippa albiventris =

Mottled Proevippa wolf spider

Species of spider

Proevippa albiventris is a southern African species of spider in the family Lycosidae.

== Distribution ==
Proevippa albiventris is found in Namibia, Botswana, and South Africa. In South Africa, it is recorded from all provinces. The species has a very wide distribution across the country, occurring in numerous protected areas including Cederberg Wilderness Area, De Hoop Nature Reserve, Kruger National Park, and many others.

== Habitat and ecology ==
Proevippa albiventris is a free-running ground dwelling spider. It has been sampled from the Fynbos, Grassland, Nama Karoo, Savanna, and Thicket biomes at altitudes ranging from 7 to 2,329 m.

== Description ==
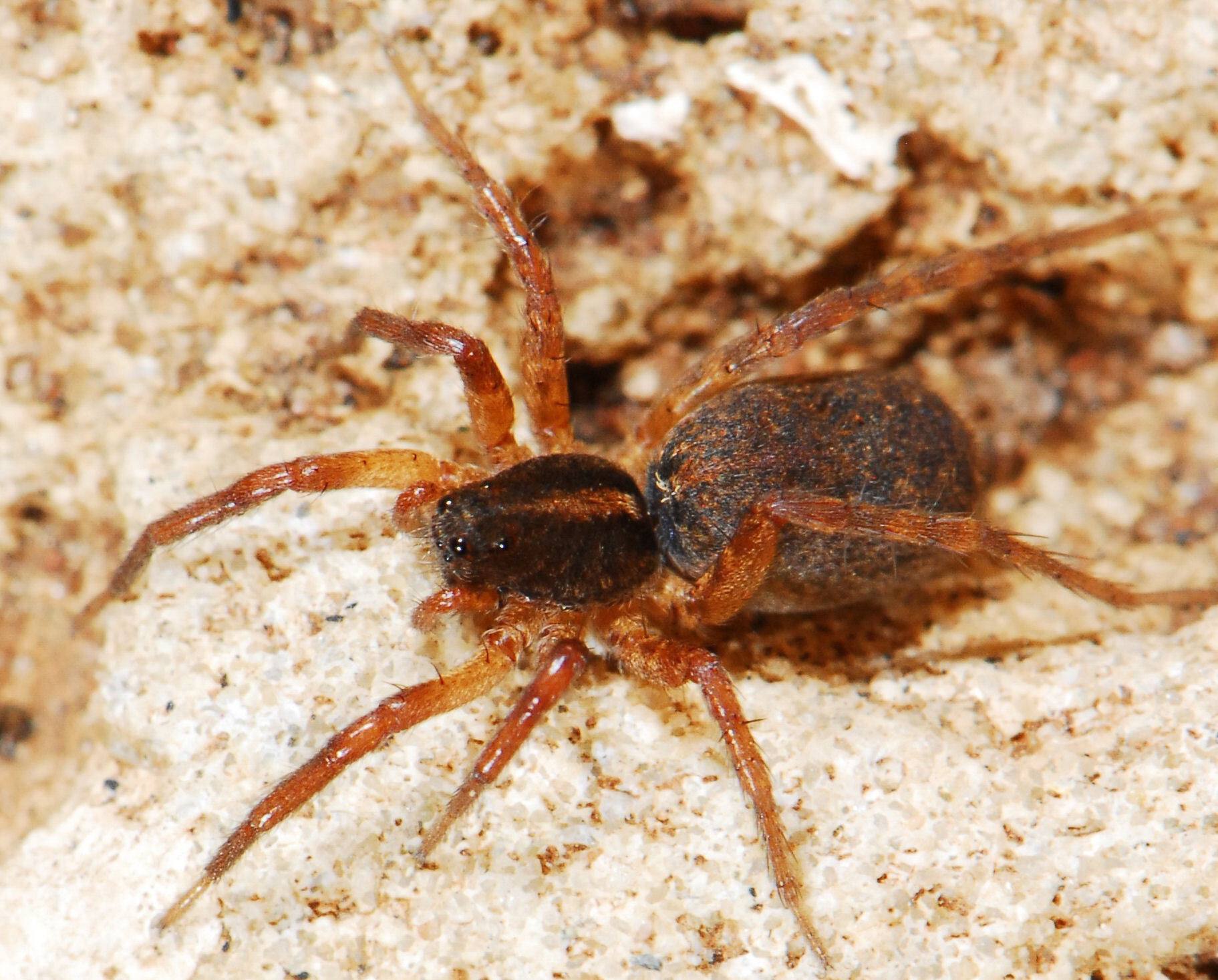
female

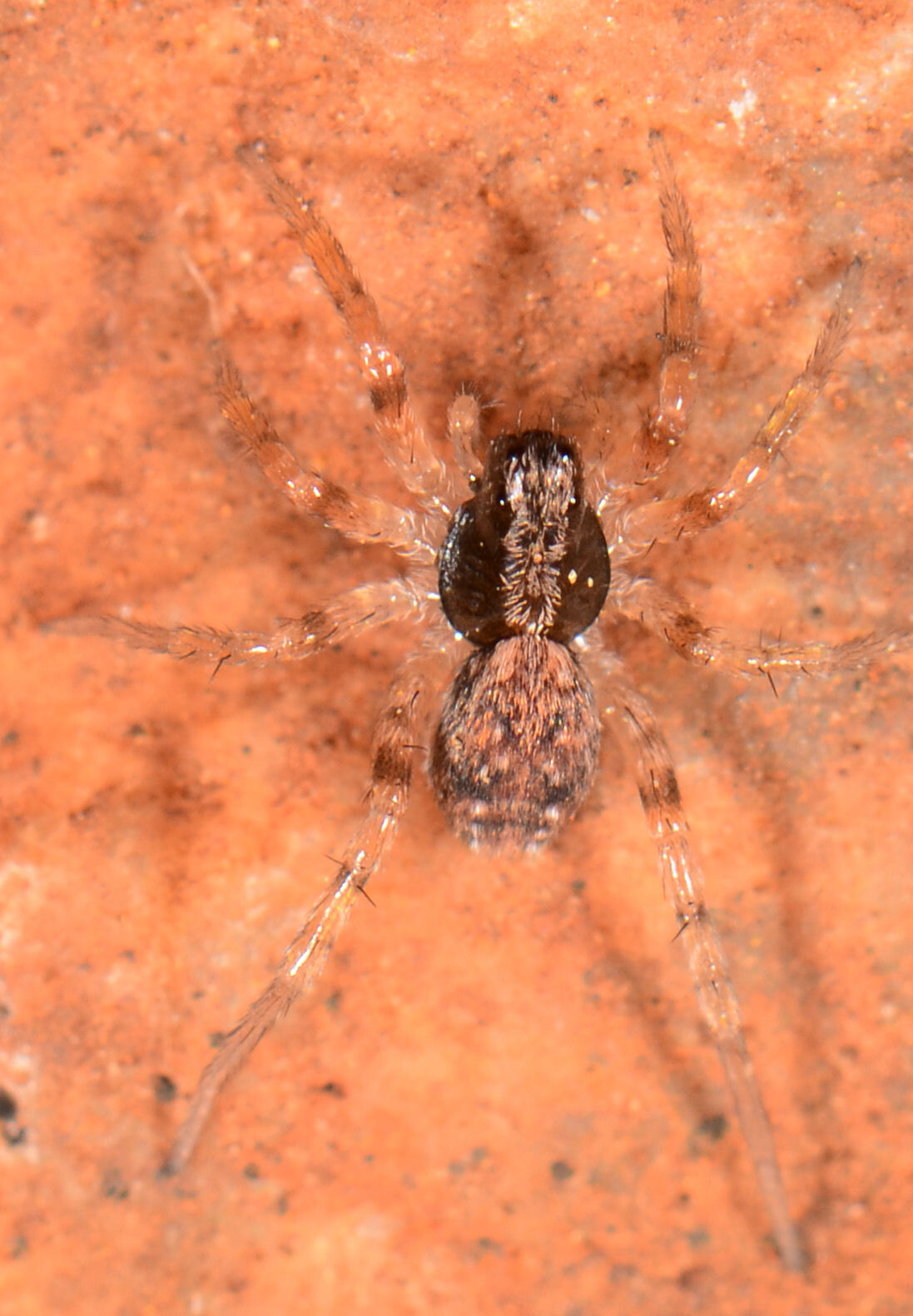
juvenile female

== Conservation ==
Proevippa albiventris is listed as Least Concern by the South African National Biodiversity Institute due to its wide distribution range. There are no significant threats to the species and it is protected in more than ten protected areas.

== Taxonomy ==
Proevippa albiventris was originally described by Eugène Simon in 1898 as Anomalomma albiventre from Makapan. Simon also described Anomalomma coccineo-plumosum in the same year, which was later synonymized with P. albiventris by Russell-Smith in 1981. The species was reviewed by Russell-Smith in 1981 and is known from both sexes.
