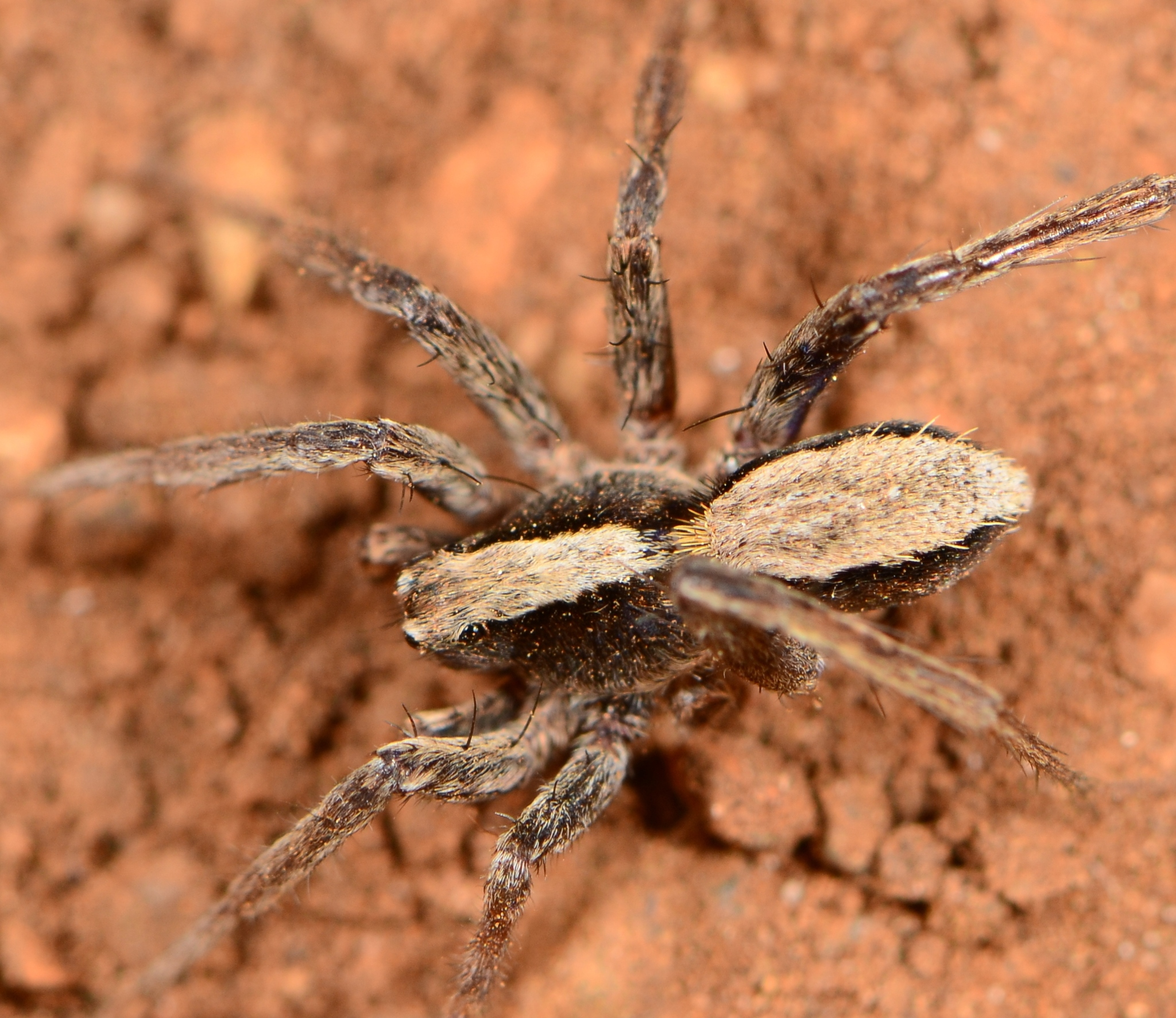
- male
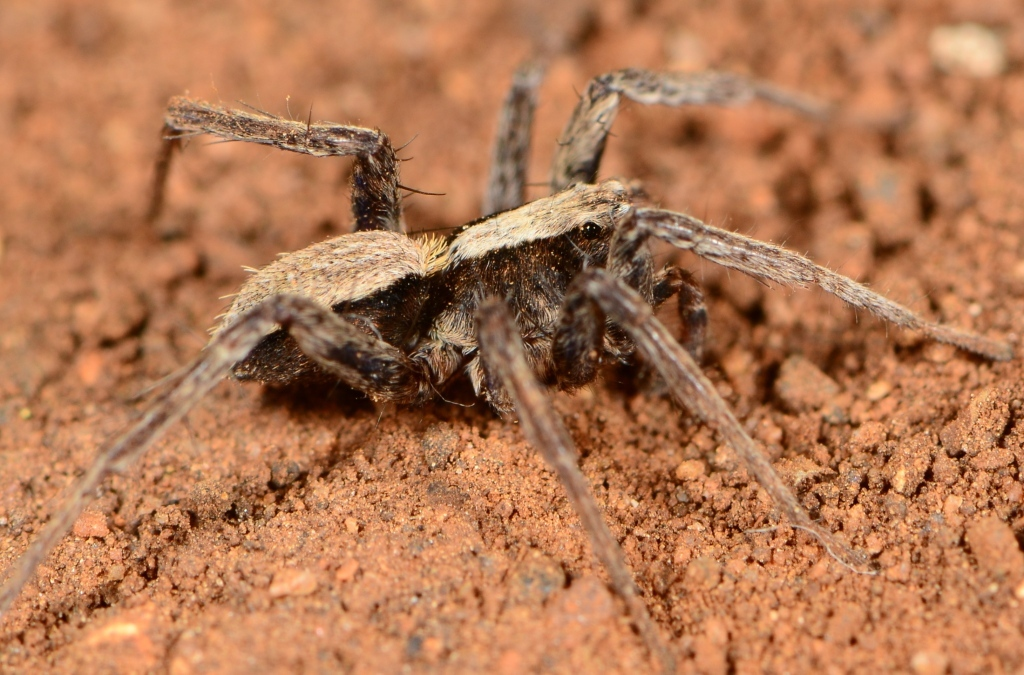
- male

Scientific classification
- Kingdom: Animalia
- Phylum: Arthropoda
- Subphylum: Chelicerata
- Class: Arachnida
- Order: Araneae
- Infraorder: Araneomorphae
- Family: Lycosidae
- Genus: Proevippa
- Species: P. fascicularis

Binomial name
- Proevippa fascicularis (Purcell, 1903)

Synonyms
- Artoria fascicularis Purcell, 1903

= Proevippa fascicularis =

Pale-banded Proevippa wolf spider

Species of spider

Proevippa fascicularis is a species of spider in the family Lycosidae. It is found in southern Africa and is commonly known as the pale-banded Proevippa wolf spider.

== Distribution ==
Proevippa fascicularis is found in Lesotho, Zimbabwe, and South Africa. In South Africa, it is recorded from eight provinces. The species has a very wide distribution and has been recorded from numerous localities across the country, including Table Mountain National Park, Golden Gate Highlands National Park, Royal Natal National Park, and Cederberg Wilderness Area.

== Habitat and ecology ==
Proevippa fascicularis is a free-running ground dwelling spider. It is widely distributed and common in dry grassland where it runs actively in more open areas. The species has been sampled from the Fynbos, Grassland, and Savanna biomes at altitudes ranging from 7 to 2,985 m.

== Description ==
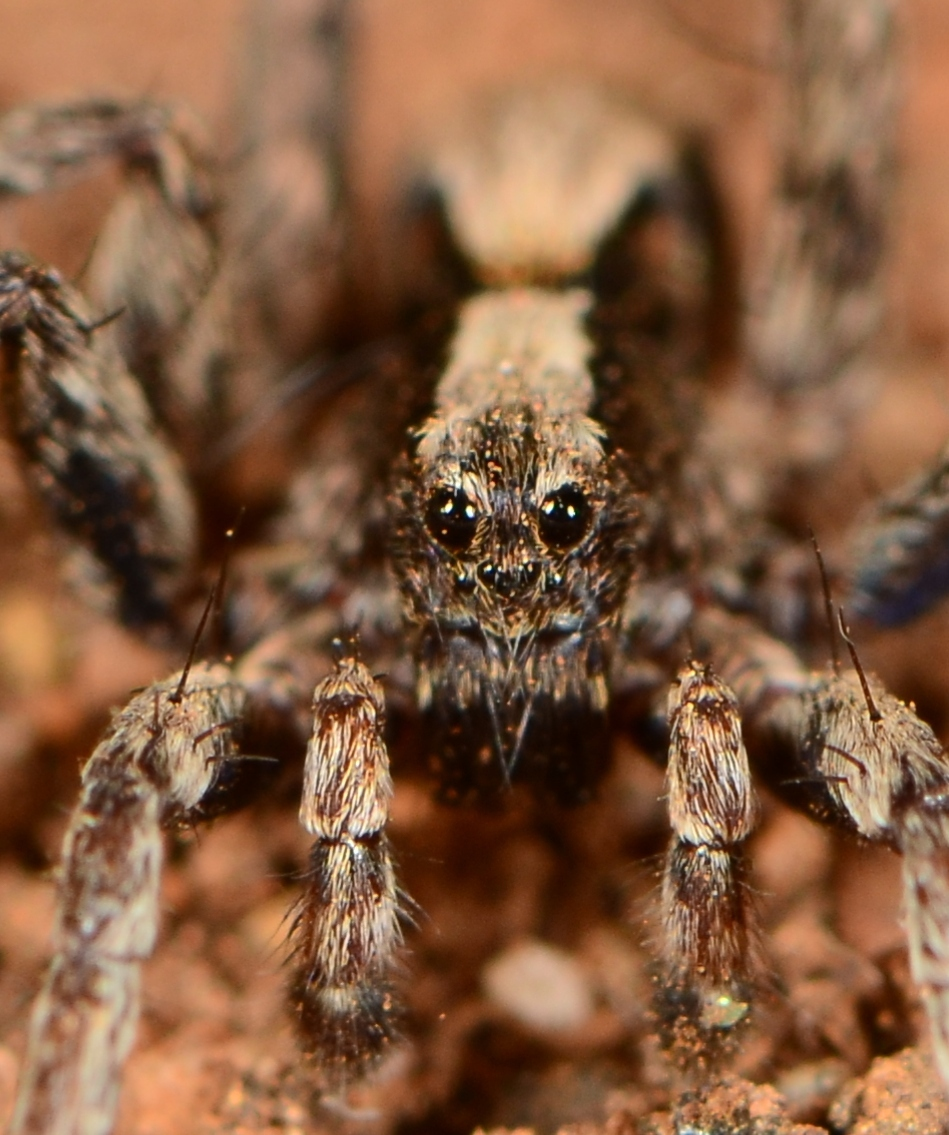
male

== Conservation ==
Proevippa fascicularis is listed as Least Concern by the South African National Biodiversity Institute due to its wide distribution range. There are no significant threats to the species and it is protected in more than ten protected areas.

== Taxonomy ==
Proevippa fascicularis was originally described by Purcell in 1903 as Artoria fascicularis from Cape Town. The species was transferred to Chaleposa by Russell-Smith in 1981, who also described the female, and subsequently moved to Proevippa. It is known from both sexes.
