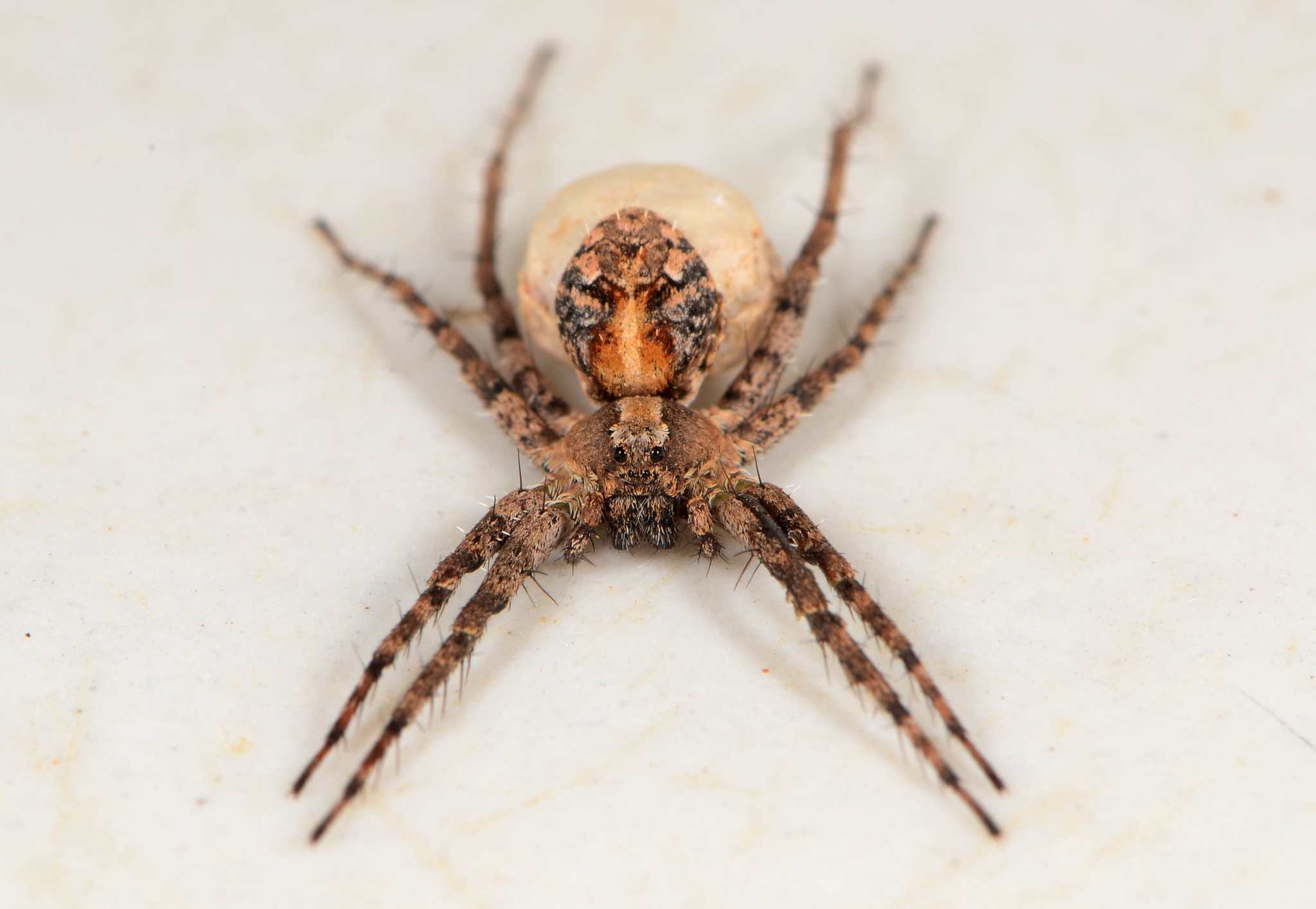
- female P. hirsuta with egg sac
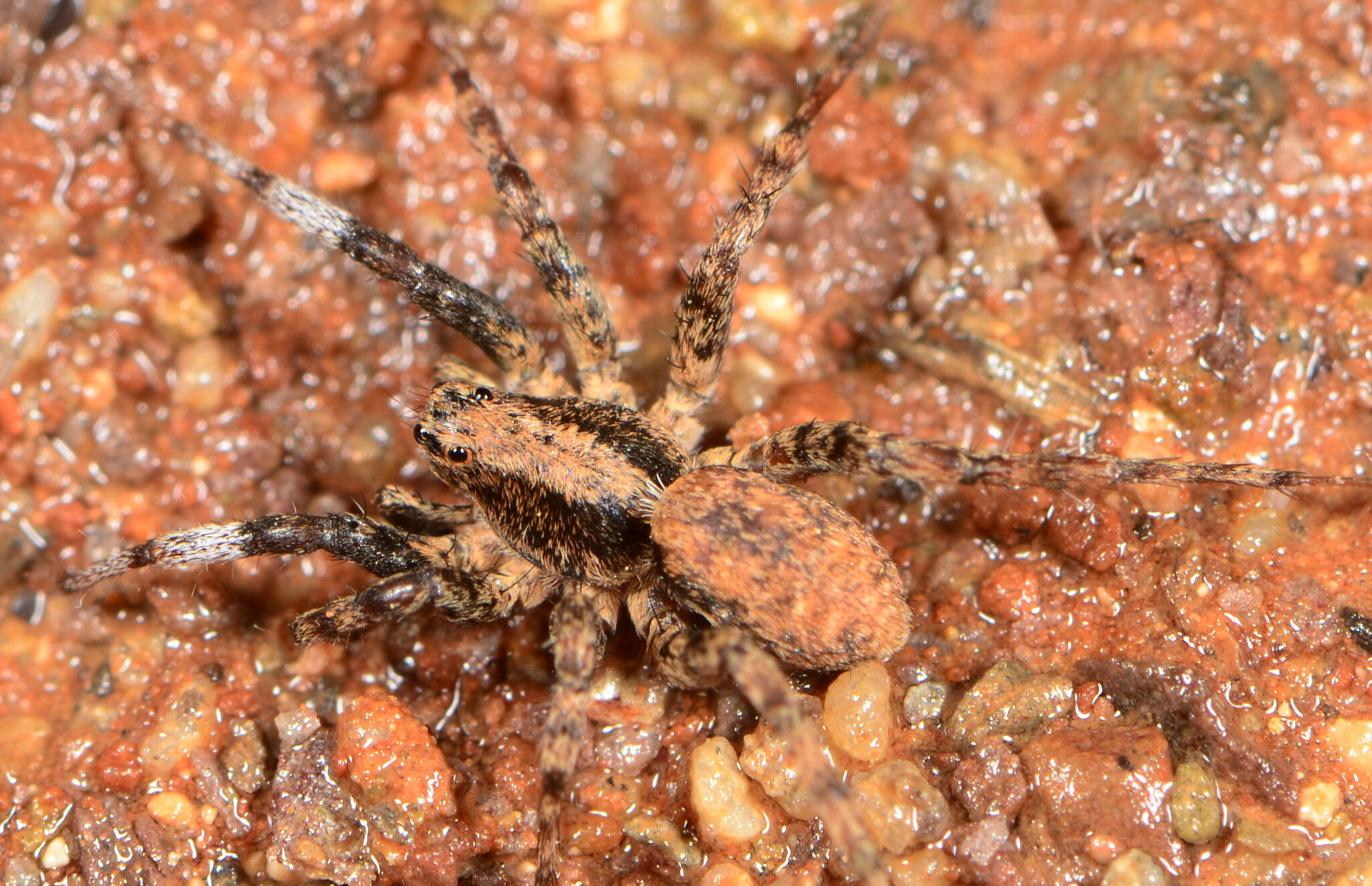
- male P. lightfooti

Scientific classification
- Kingdom: Animalia
- Phylum: Arthropoda
- Subphylum: Chelicerata
- Class: Arachnida
- Order: Araneae
- Infraorder: Araneomorphae
- Family: Lycosidae
- Genus: Proevippa; Purcell

Species
- 11, see text

= Proevippa =

Genus of spiders

Proevippa is a genus of mostly southern African spiders in the family Lycosidae with eleven recognized species. It was first described in 1903 by William Frederick Purcell.

== Lifestyle ==
The species in Proevippa are free-running ground dwellers. They have been sampled from most of the floral biomes.

== Description ==
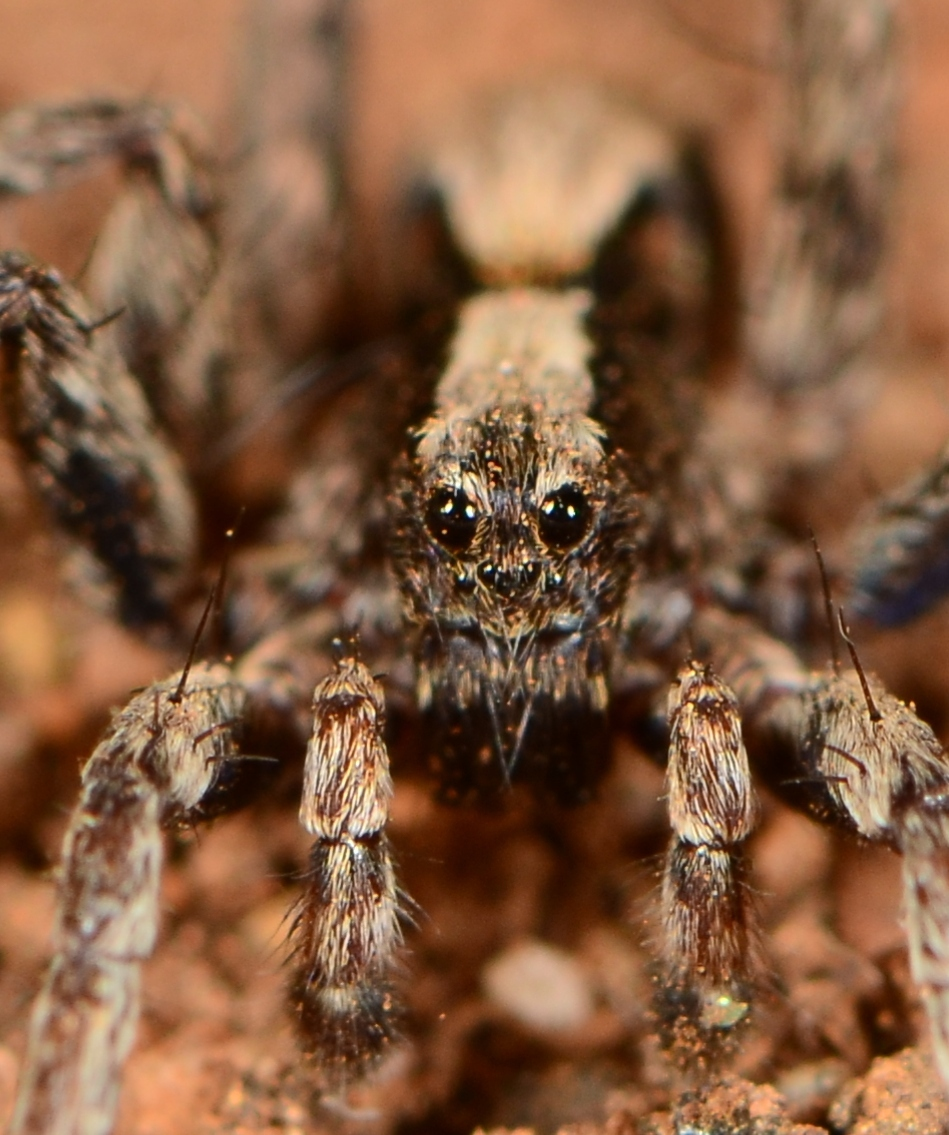
male P. fascicularis

Proevippa contains medium to large spiders ranging from 4.7 mm to 10.5 mm in length. The body is covered with plumose hairs.

Sexes are generally similar in body form but with some dimorphism of the abdominal markings in some species. The carapace is very variable in form, ranging from long and narrow to broad and oval. The head region of most species is only slightly raised but markedly so in some species and very flattened in others. The carapace is normally clothed in minute plumose hairs the structure of which is only visible under the compound microscope. The typical pattern includes a broad, pale, dorso-median band extending backwards from the middle row of eyes.

The fovea is normally long. The anterior eye row is normally procurved. Eyes are either subequal in size or the medians are somewhat larger than the laterals. The eyes are either equidistant or the medians are closer to one another than to the laterals. The second row of eyes is more widely spaced than the anterior row. The posterior row of eyes is slightly or considerably more widely spaced.

== Species ==
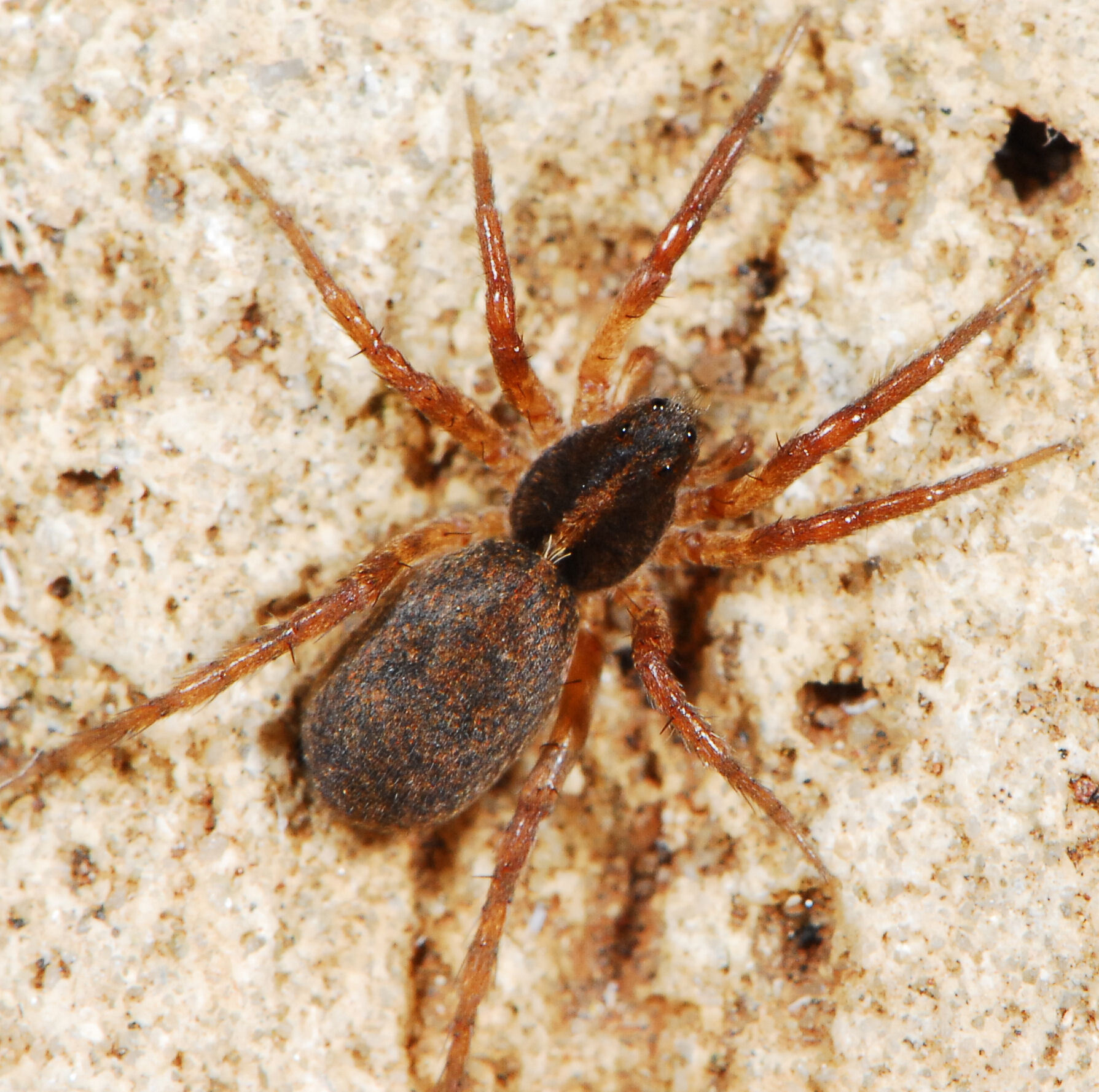
female P. albiventris

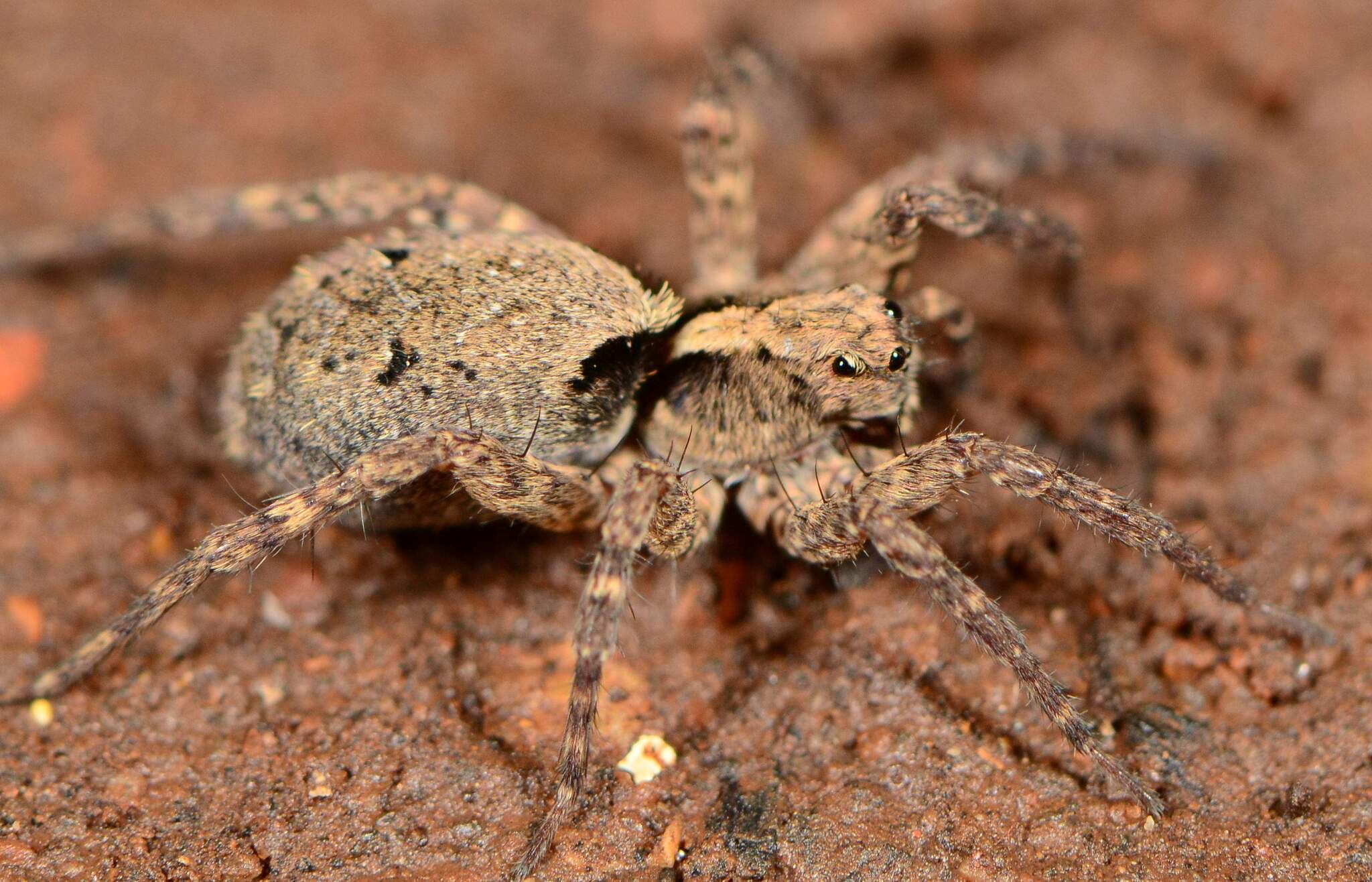
female P. biampliata

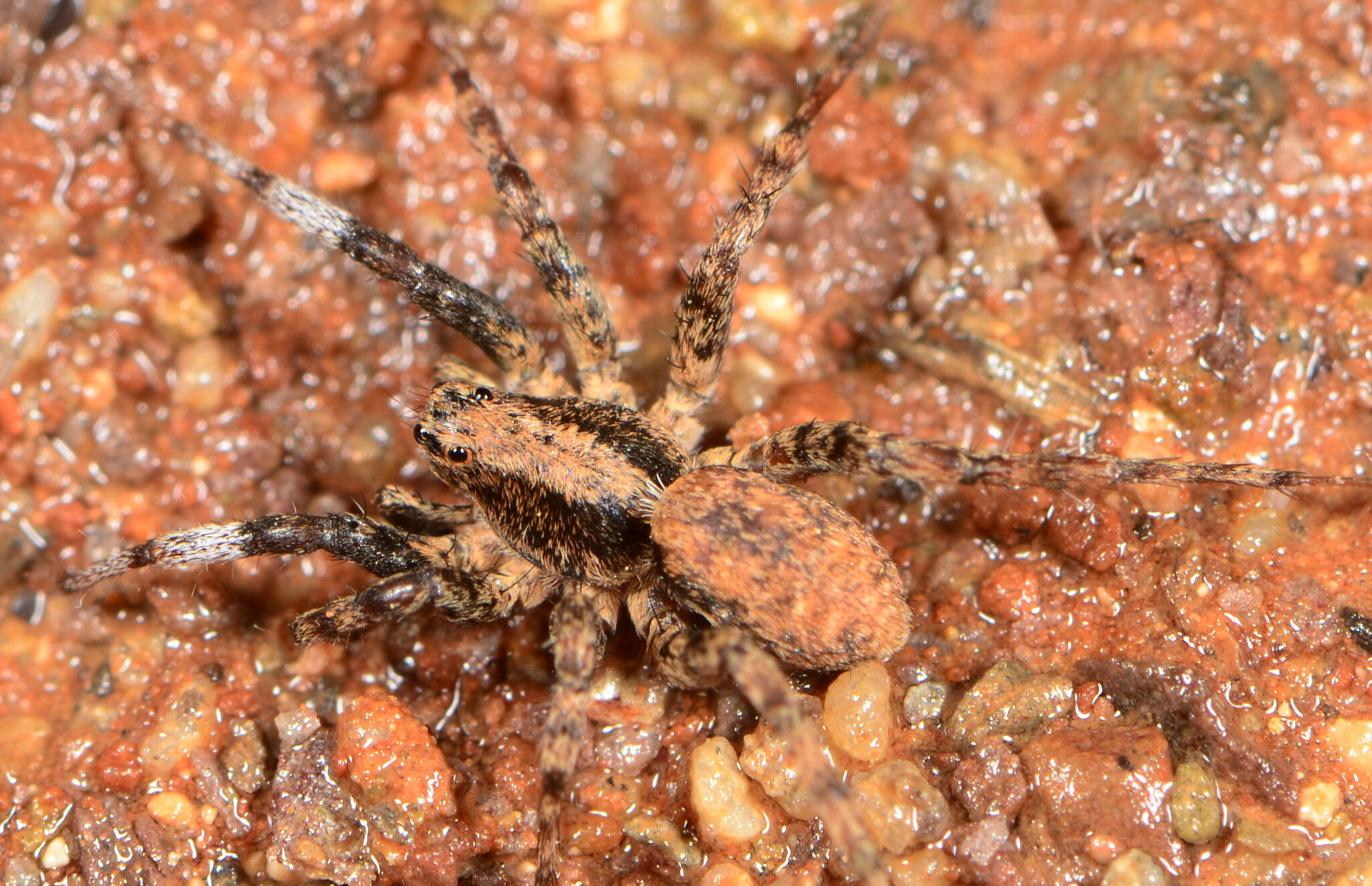
male P. lightfooti

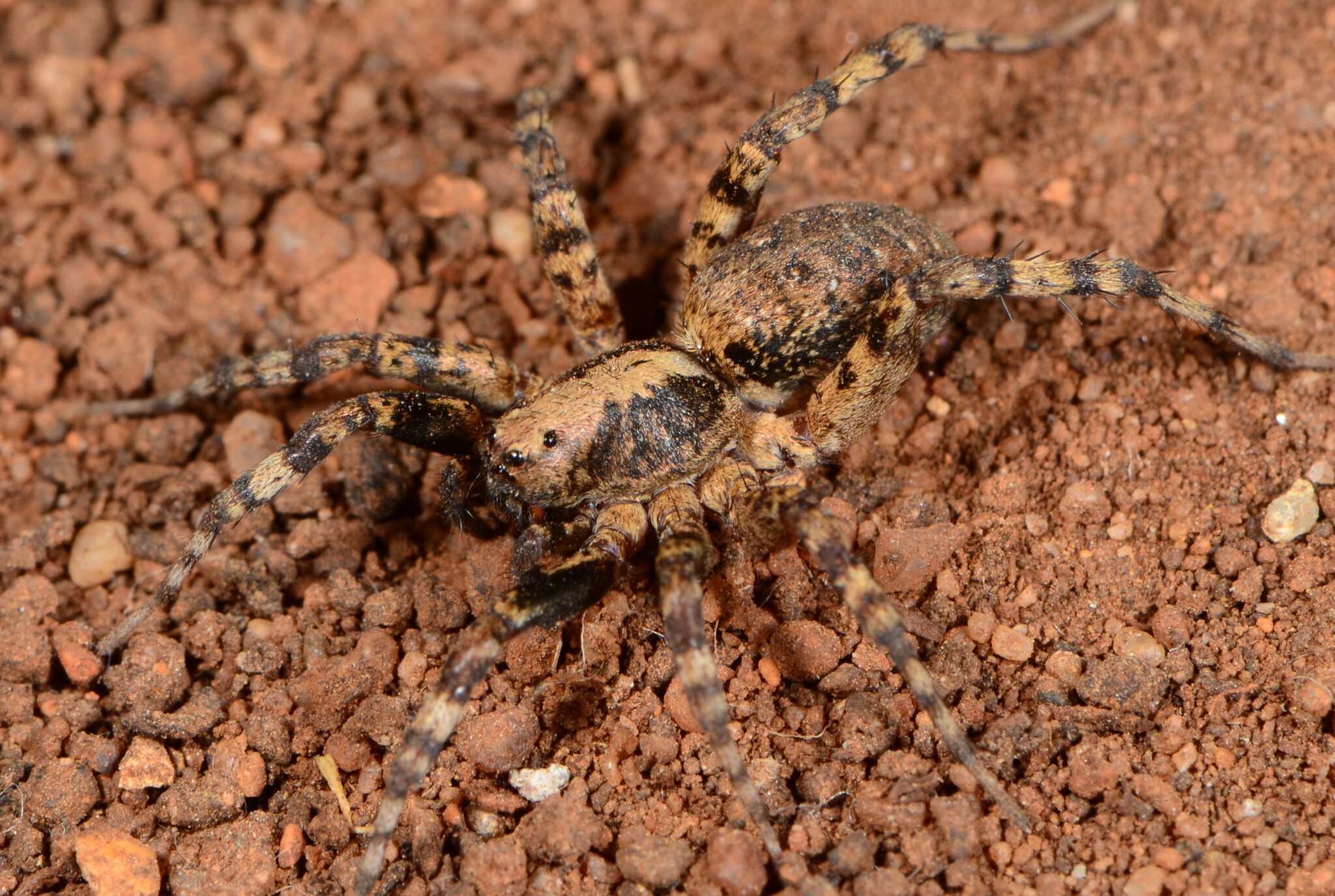
male P. schreineri

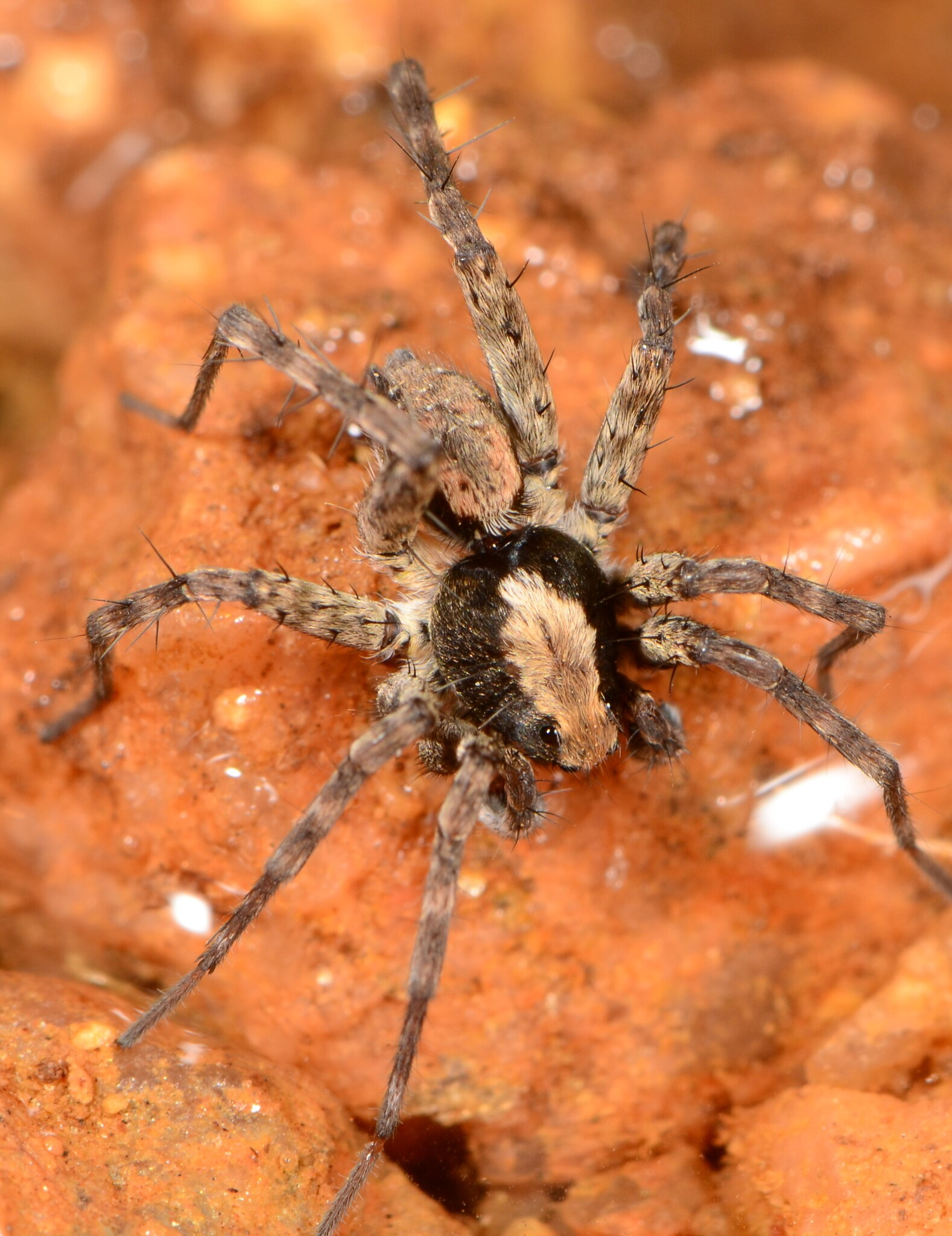
female P. wanlessi

As of October 2025, this genus includes eleven species:

- Proevippa albiventris (Simon, 1898) – Namibia, Botswana, South Africa
- Proevippa biampliata (Purcell, 1903) – South Africa, Lesotho
- Proevippa bruneipes (Purcell, 1903) – South Africa, Lesotho
- Proevippa dregei (Purcell, 1903) – South Africa
- Proevippa eberlanzi (Roewer, 1959) – Namibia
- Proevippa fascicularis (Purcell, 1903) – Zimbabwe, South Africa, Lesotho
- Proevippa hirsuta (Russell-Smith, 1981) – South Africa, Lesotho
- Proevippa lightfooti Purcell, 1903 – South Africa (type species)
- Proevippa schreineri (Purcell, 1903) – South Africa, Lesotho
- Proevippa unicolor (Roewer, 1960) – DR Congo
- Proevippa wanlessi (Russell-Smith, 1981) – South Africa
