= Proevippa dregei =

Eastern Cape Proevippa wolf spider

Scientific classification
- Kingdom: Animalia
- Phylum: Arthropoda
- Subphylum: Chelicerata
- Class: Arachnida
- Order: Araneae
- Infraorder: Araneomorphae
- Family: Lycosidae
- Genus: Proevippa
- Species: P. dregei

Binomial name
- Proevippa dregei (Purcell, 1903)

Synonyms
- Lycosa dregei Purcell, 1903; Arctosa dregei Roewer, 1955

Species of spider

Proevippa dregei is a species of spider in the family Lycosidae. It is endemic to South Africa and is commonly known as the Eastern Cape Proevippa wolf spider.

== Distribution ==
Proevippa dregei is found in South Africa. It is endemic to the Eastern Cape province, where it is recorded from several localities at altitudes ranging from 30 to 1,381 m. Localities include Van Stadens River, Dunbrody, East London, Graaff-Reinet, Mountain Zebra National Park, Uitenhage, Willowmore, and Jeffrey's Bay.

== Habitat and ecology ==
Proevippa dregei is a free-running ground dwelling spider sampled from the Thicket biome.

== Description ==
The abdomen is dark brown with a paler median V-shaped mark. It is clothed in long, sub-erect dark hairs. The underside and spinnerets are pale yellow. The total length is 10.5 mm.

== Conservation ==
Proevippa dregei is listed as Least Concern by the South African National Biodiversity Institute due to its wide geographic range within the Eastern Cape. The species is threatened by loss of habitat for crop farming but is protected in Mountain Zebra National Park.

== Taxonomy ==
Proevippa dregei was originally described by Purcell in 1903 as Lycosa dregei from Van Stadens River. The species was transferred to Arctosa by Roewer in 1955 and subsequently to Chaleposa by Russell-Smith in 1981, before being moved to Proevippa. It is known from both sexes.
