= Proevippa bruneipes =

Scientific classification
- Kingdom: Animalia
- Phylum: Arthropoda
- Subphylum: Chelicerata
- Class: Arachnida
- Order: Araneae
- Infraorder: Araneomorphae
- Family: Lycosidae
- Genus: Proevippa
- Species: P. bruneipes

Binomial name
- Proevippa bruneipes (Purcell, 1903)

Synonyms
- Lycosa bruneipes Purcell, 1903; Lycosa cretata Purcell, 1903; Geolycosa cretata Roewer, 1955; Trochosa bruneipes Roewer, 1955

Species of spider

Proevippa bruneipes is a southern African species of spider in the family Lycosidae.

== Distribution ==
Proevippa bruneipes is found in Lesotho and South Africa. In South Africa, it is recorded from the provinces Eastern Cape, KwaZulu-Natal, Limpopo, Mpumalanga, Northern Cape, and Western Cape. The species occurs at altitudes ranging from 18 to 1,685 m. Localities include Hanover, Oribi Gorge Nature Reserve, Lowveld National Botanical Gardens, and Cederberg Wilderness Area.

== Habitat and ecology ==
Proevippa bruneipes is a free-running ground dwelling spider sampled from Fynbos, Grassland, Nama Karoo, and Savanna biomes.

== Conservation ==
Proevippa bruneipes is listed as Least Concern by the South African National Biodiversity Institute due to its wide geographical range. The species is threatened by farming activities in the Montagu area but is presently protected in Oribi Gorge Nature Reserve, Lowveld National Botanical Gardens, Lekgalameetse Nature Reserve, and Cederberg Wilderness Area.

== Etymology ==
The specific name is Latin for "brown foot".

== Taxonomy ==
Proevippa bruneipes was originally described by Purcell in 1903 as Lycosa bruneipes from Hanover. Purcell also described Lycosa cretata in the same publication, which was later synonymized with P. bruneipes by Russell-Smith in 1981. The species is known from both sexes.
