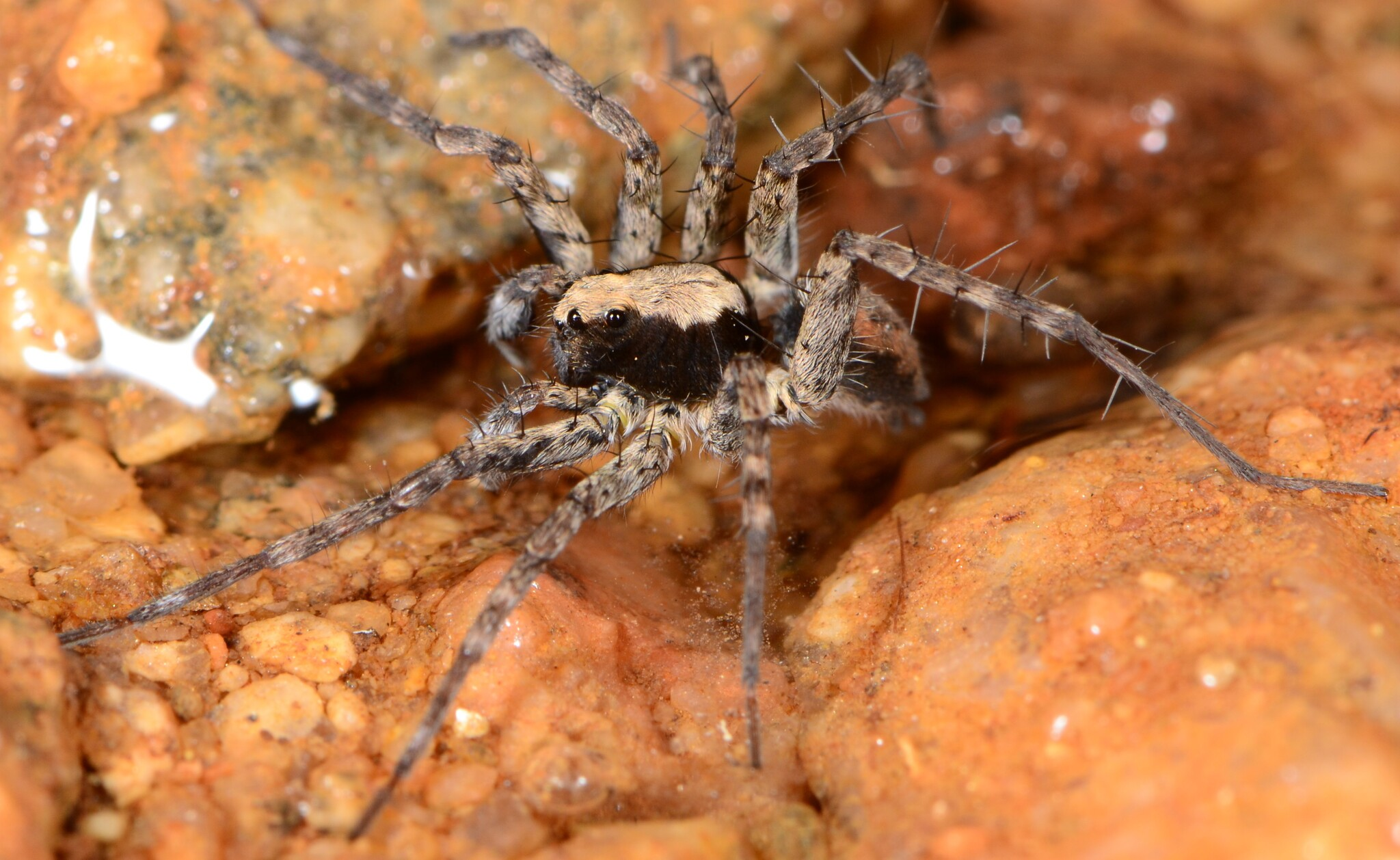
- female
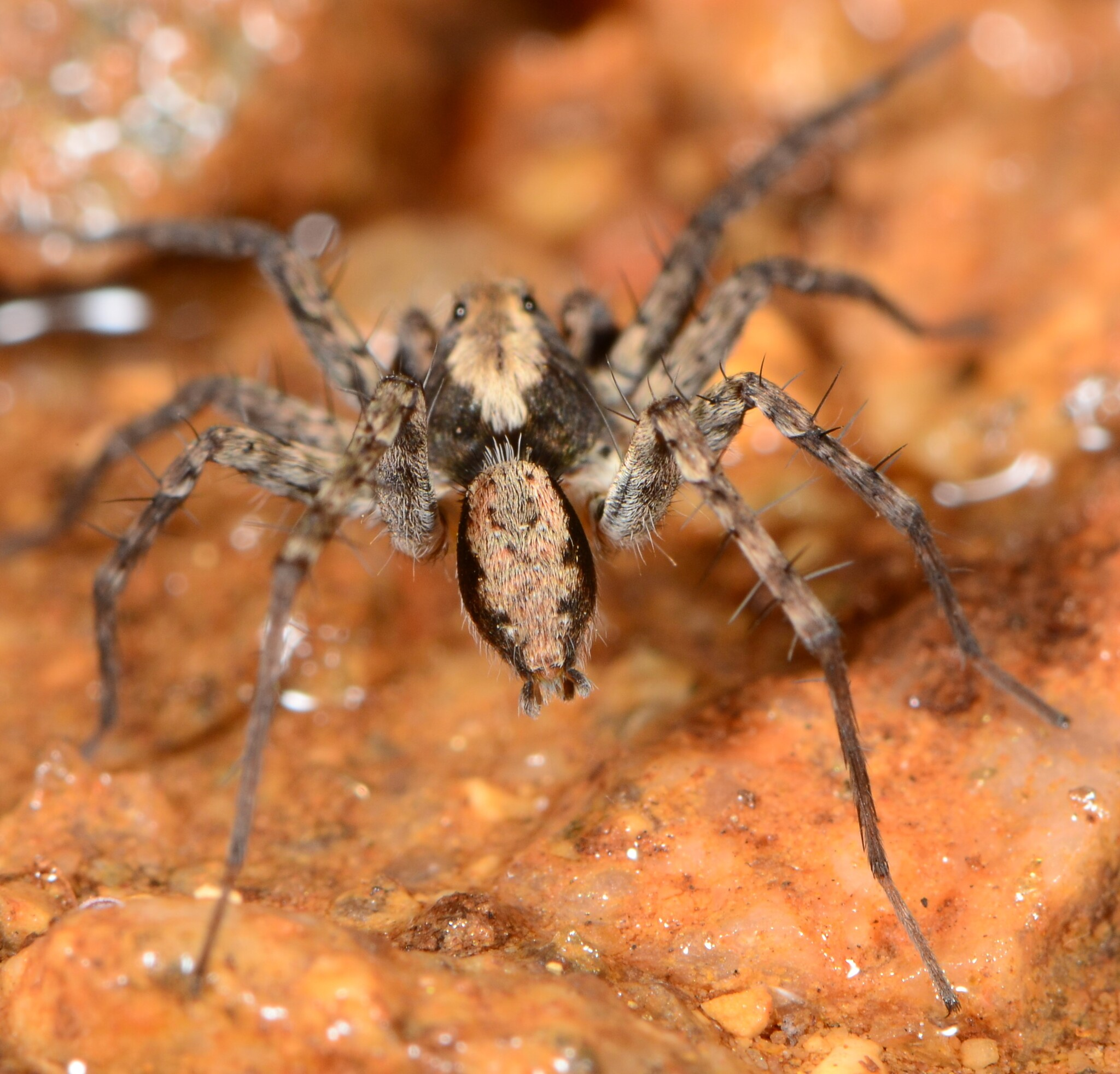
- female

Scientific classification
- Kingdom: Animalia
- Phylum: Arthropoda
- Subphylum: Chelicerata
- Class: Arachnida
- Order: Araneae
- Infraorder: Araneomorphae
- Family: Lycosidae
- Genus: Proevippa
- Species: P. wanlessi

Binomial name
- Proevippa wanlessi (Russell-Smith, 1981)

Synonyms
- Chaleposa wanlessi Russell-Smith, 1981

= Proevippa wanlessi =

Banded Proevippa wolf spider

Species of spider

Proevippa wanlessi is a species of spider in the family Lycosidae. It is endemic to South Africa and is commonly known as the banded Proevippa wolf spider.

== Distribution ==
Proevippa wanlessi is found in South Africa. It is recorded from three provinces: Gauteng, KwaZulu-Natal, and Limpopo. The species occurs at altitudes ranging from 647 to 1,719 m. Localities include Melville Koppies, Pietermaritzburg, Blouberg Nature Reserve, Lhuvhondo Nature Reserve, Polokwane Nature Reserve, Lekgalameetse Nature Reserve, and Ben Lavin Nature Reserve.

== Habitat and ecology ==
Proevippa wanlessi is a common ground dwelling spider in Acacia savanna. It has been sampled from the Grassland and Savanna biomes.

== Description ==
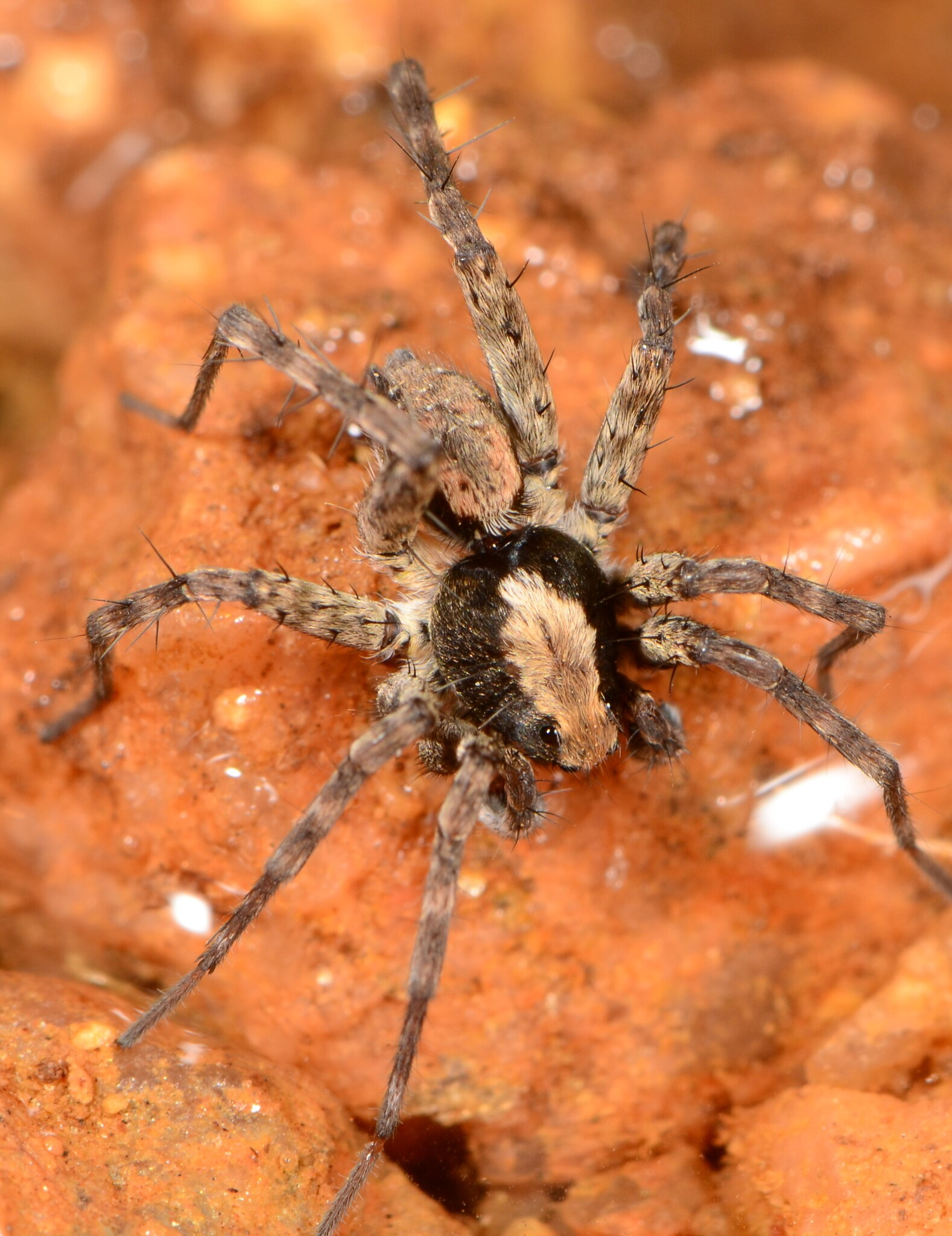
female

== Conservation ==
Proevippa wanlessi is listed as Least Concern by the South African National Biodiversity Institute due to its wide geographical range. There are no known threats to the species and it is protected in Blouberg Nature Reserve, Lhuvhondo Nature Reserve, Polokwane Nature Reserve, Lekgalameetse Nature Reserve, and Ben Lavin Nature Reserve.

== Etymology ==
The species is named after British arachnologist Fred Wanless.

== Taxonomy ==
Proevippa wanlessi was described by Russell-Smith in 1981 as Chaleposa wanlessi from Pietermaritzburg. The species was subsequently moved to Proevippa and is known only from males.
