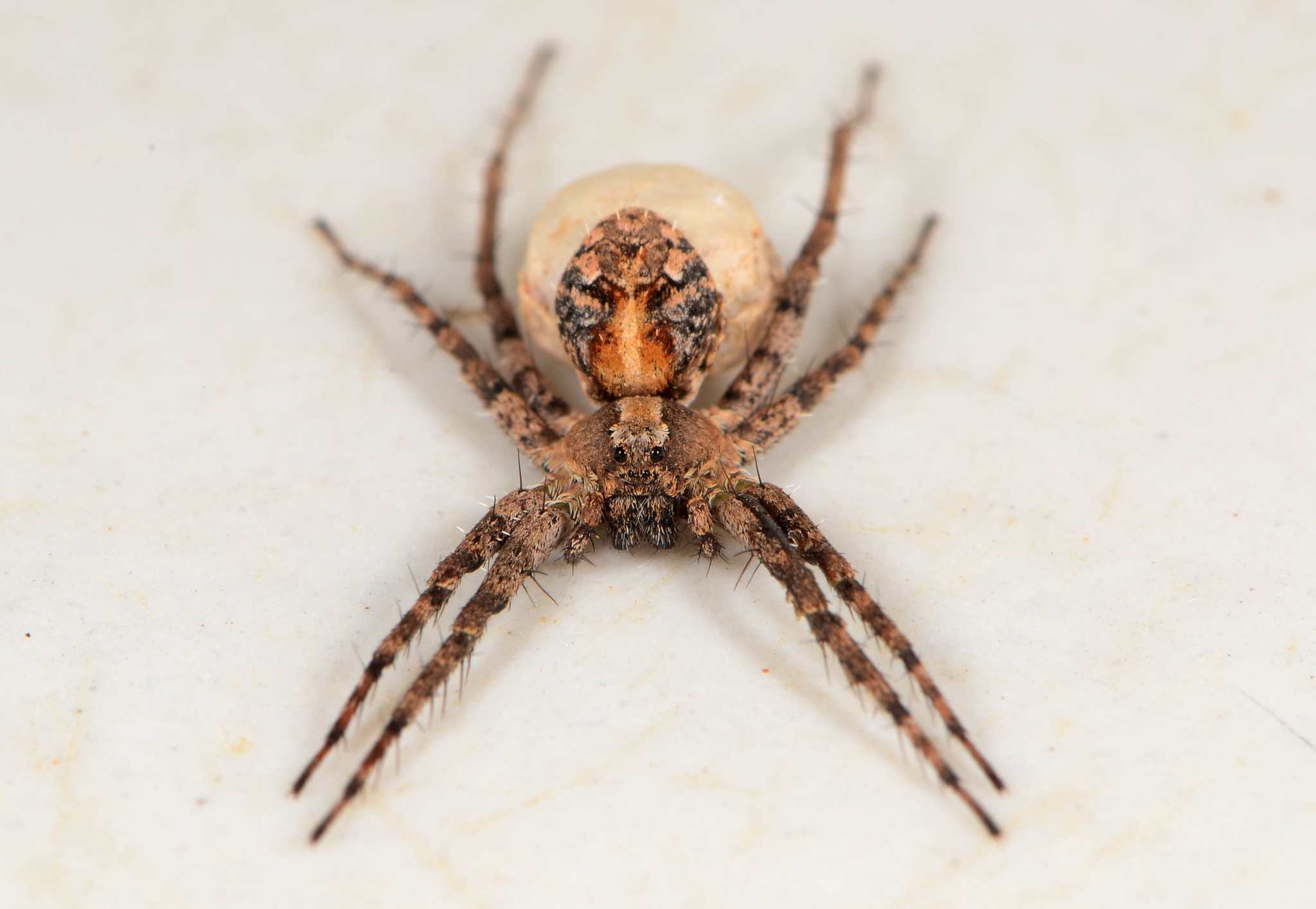
- female with egg sac
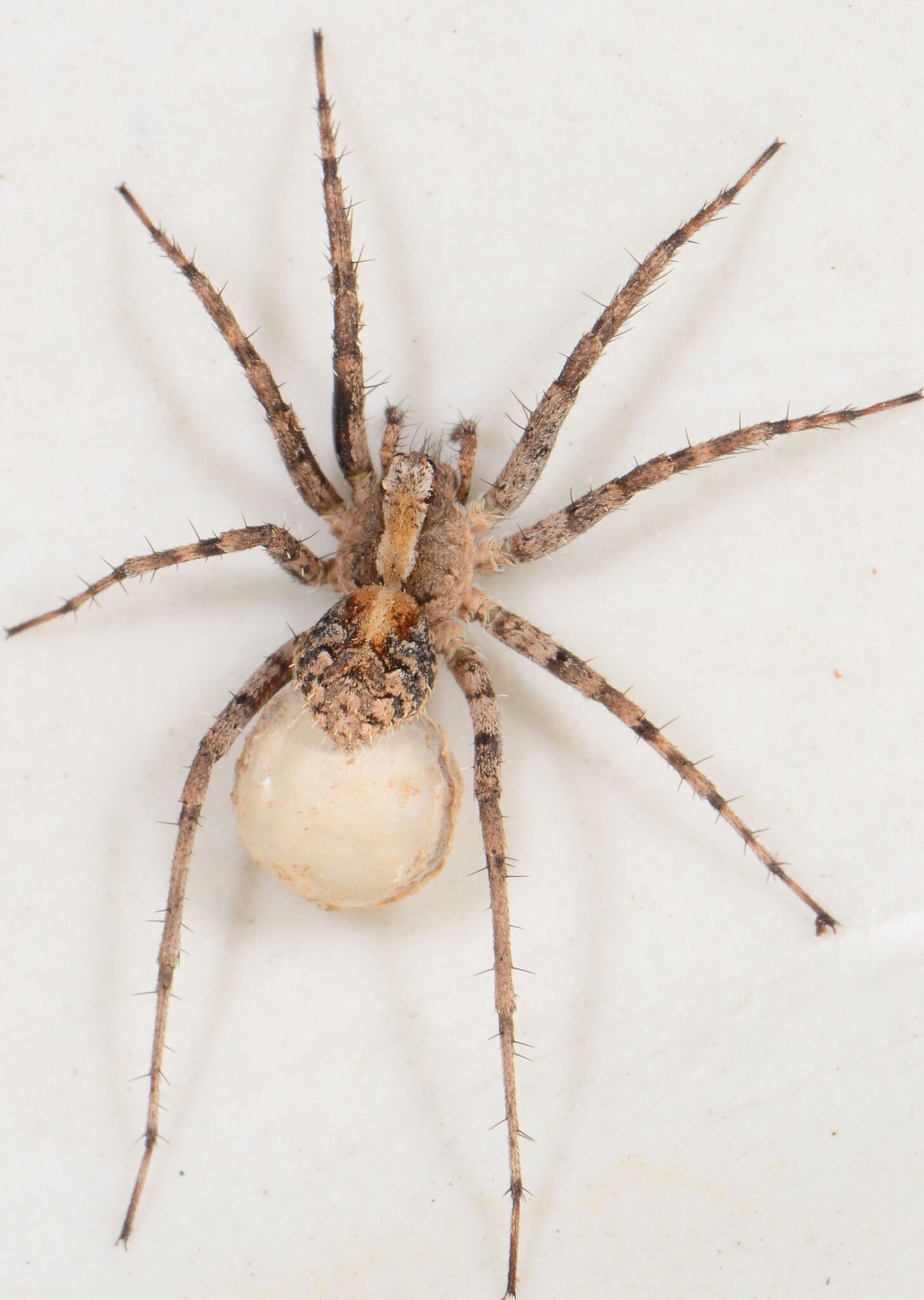
- female with egg sac

Scientific classification
- Kingdom: Animalia
- Phylum: Arthropoda
- Subphylum: Chelicerata
- Class: Arachnida
- Order: Araneae
- Infraorder: Araneomorphae
- Family: Lycosidae
- Genus: Proevippa
- Species: P. hirsuta

Binomial name
- Proevippa hirsuta (Russell-Smith, 1981)

Synonyms
- Chaleposa hirsuta Russell-Smith, 1981

= Proevippa hirsuta =

Hairy Proevippa wolf spider

Species of spider

Proevippa hirsuta is a species of spider in the family Lycosidae. It is found in southern Africa and is commonly known as the hairy Proevippa wolf spider.

== Distribution ==
Proevippa hirsuta is found in Lesotho and South Africa. In South Africa, the species is recorded from the provinces Eastern Cape, Gauteng, Limpopo, KwaZulu-Natal, and Western Cape. Notable locations include Asante Sana Private Game Reserve, Irene Gem Village, Klipriviersberg Nature Reserve, Roodeplaatdam Nature Reserve, and Royal Natal National Park.

== Habitat and ecology ==
Proevippa hirsuta is a free-running ground dwelling spider that has been observed to inhabit damp places near water. It has been sampled from the Fynbos, Grassland, and Savanna biomes at altitudes ranging from 130 to 1,730 m.

== Description ==
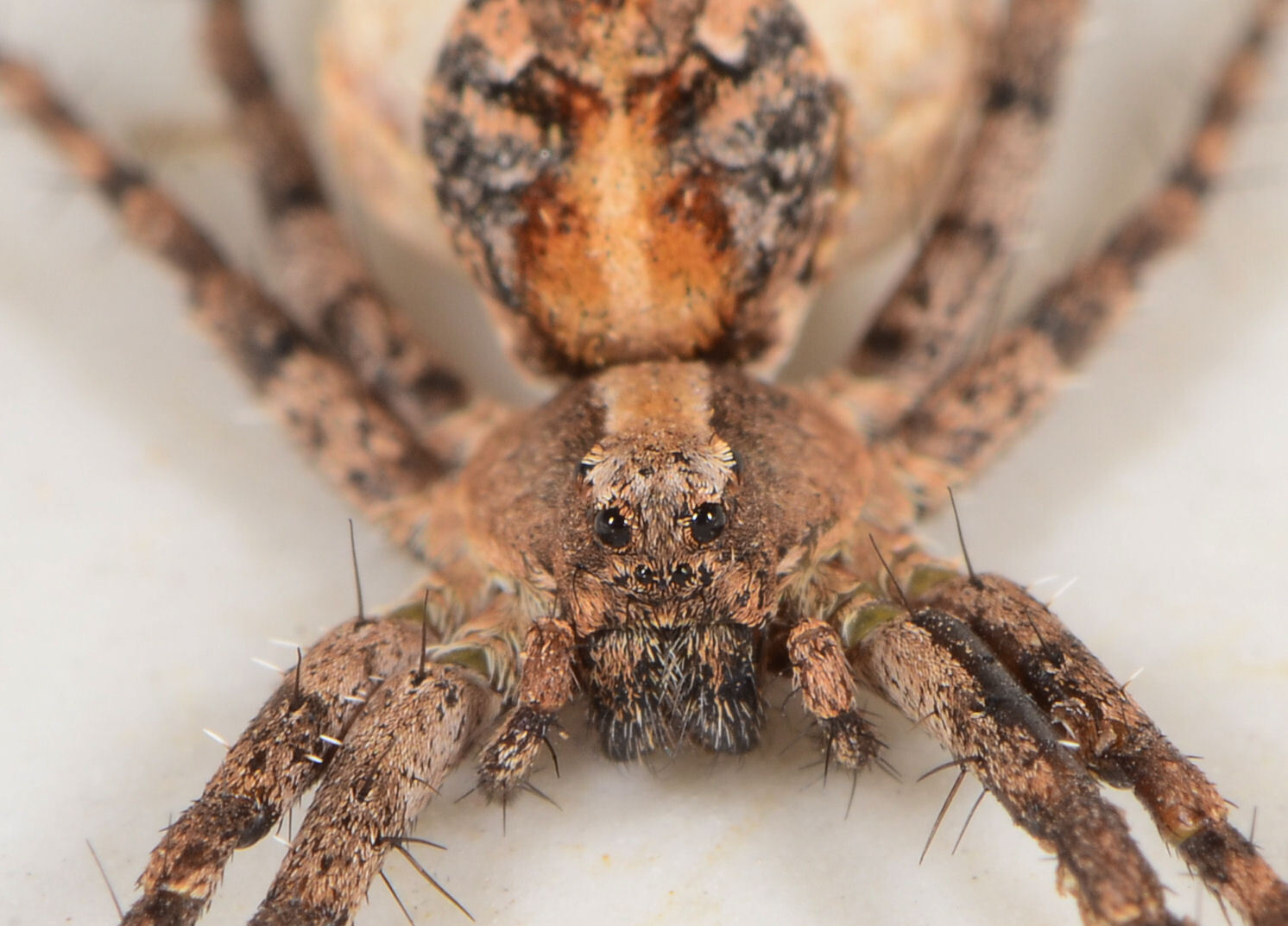
detail of female

== Conservation ==
Proevippa hirsuta is listed as Least Concern by the South African National Biodiversity Institute due to its distribution range. There are no significant threats to the species and it is presently protected in Royal Natal National Park, Roodeplaatdam Nature Reserve, and Klipriviersberg Nature Reserve.

== Etymology ==
The specific name means "hairy" in Latin.

== Taxonomy ==
Proevippa hirsuta was described by Russell-Smith in 1981 as Chaleposa hirsuta from Lesotho. The species was subsequently moved to Proevippa and is known from both sexes.
