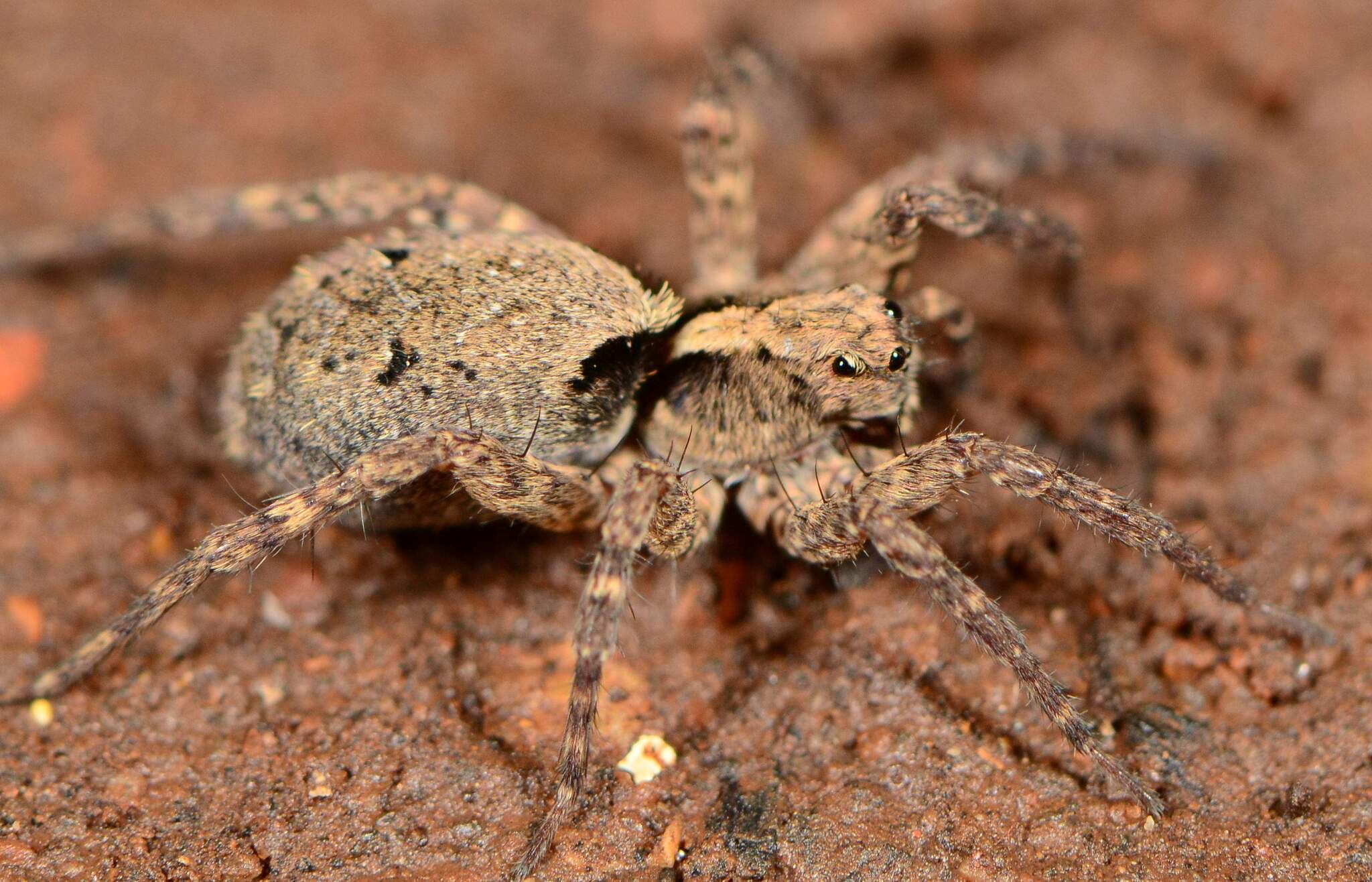
- female
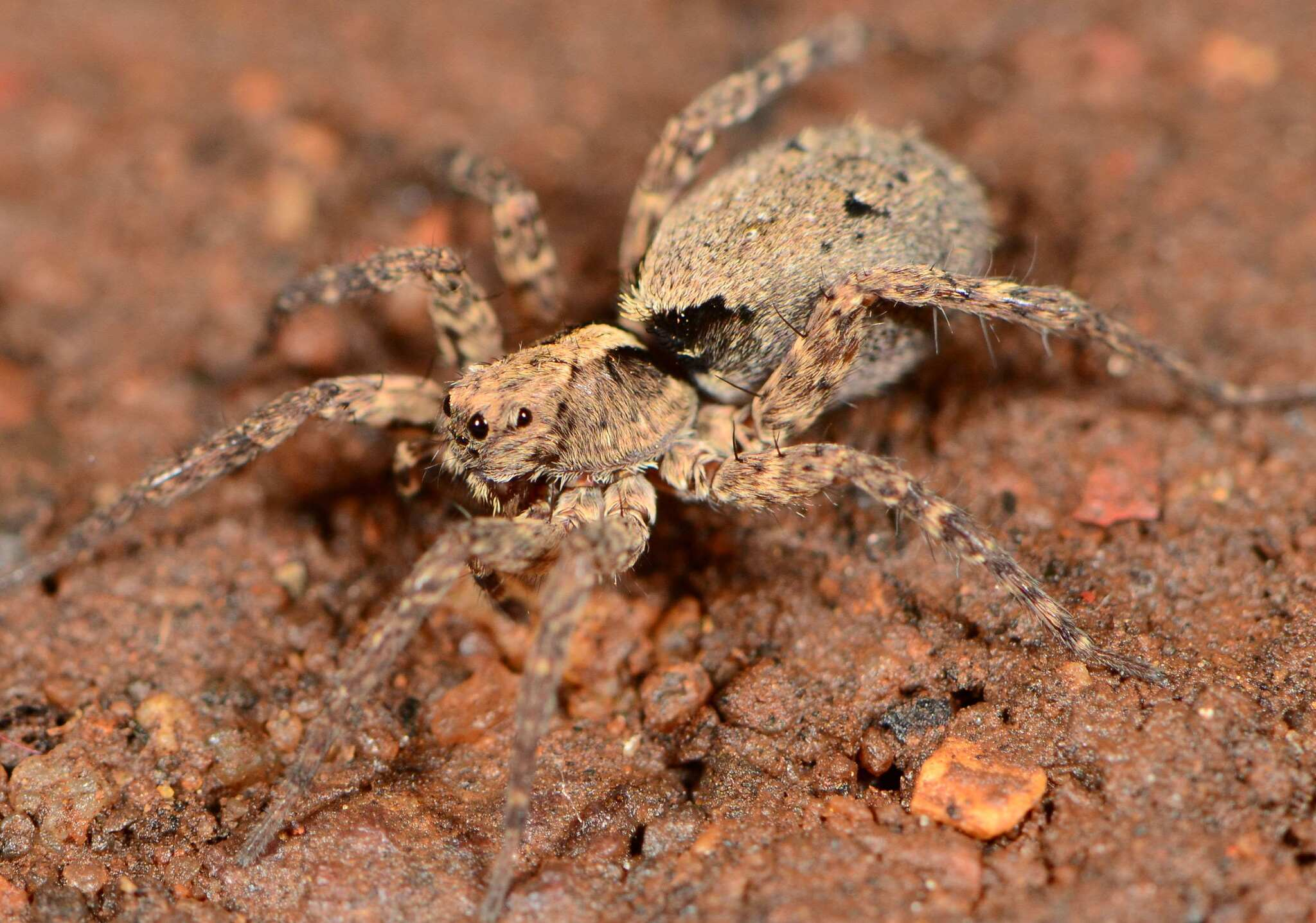
- female

Scientific classification
- Kingdom: Animalia
- Phylum: Arthropoda
- Subphylum: Chelicerata
- Class: Arachnida
- Order: Araneae
- Infraorder: Araneomorphae
- Family: Lycosidae
- Genus: Proevippa
- Species: P. biampliata

Binomial name
- Proevippa biampliata (Purcell, 1903)

Synonyms
- Lycosa biampliata Purcell, 1903

= Proevippa biampliata =

V-shaped Proevippa wolf spider

Species of spider

Proevippa biampliata is a species of spider in the family Lycosidae. It is found in southern Africa and is commonly known as the V-shaped Proevippa wolf spider.

== Distribution ==
Proevippa biampliata is found in Lesotho and South Africa. In South Africa, it is recorded from the provinces Eastern Cape, Free State, KwaZulu-Natal, Mpumalanga, Northern Cape, and Western Cape. Notable locations include the Cape Peninsula, Sani Pass at various altitudes, Bontebok National Park, and Cederberg Wilderness Area.

== Habitat and ecology ==
Proevippa biampliata occurs in various biomes. It has been sampled from Grassland, Savanna, Fynbos, and Thicket biomes at altitudes ranging from 6 to 2,598 m.

== Description ==
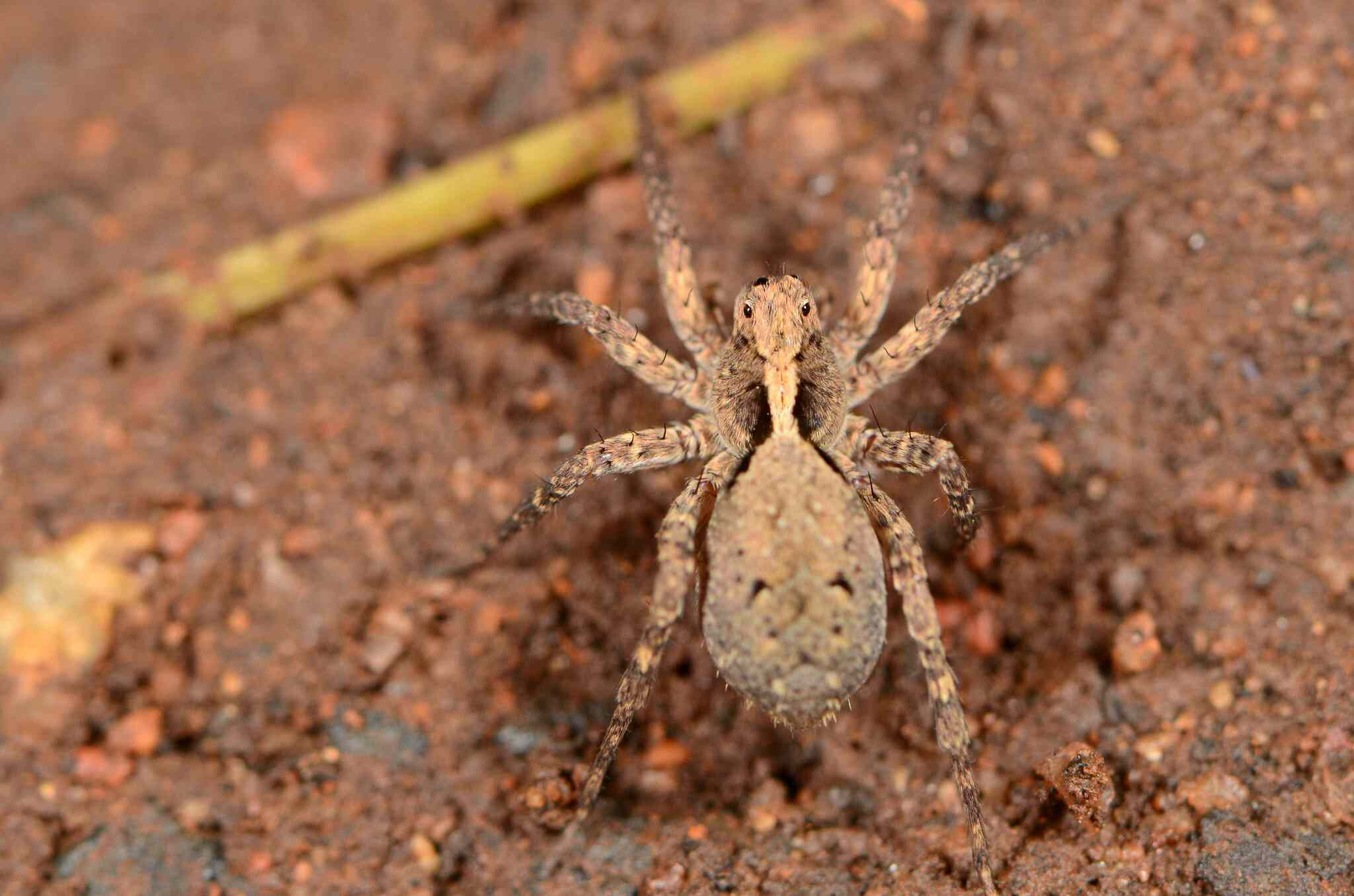
female

== Conservation ==
Proevippa biampliata is listed as Least Concern by the South African National Biodiversity Institute due to its wide geographical range. There are no significant threats to the species and it is protected in more than ten protected areas.

== Taxonomy ==
Proevippa biampliata was originally described by Purcell in 1903 as Lycosa biampliata from the Cape Peninsula. The species was transferred to the genus Chaleposa by Russell-Smith in 1981, who also described the female, and subsequently moved to Proevippa. It is known from both sexes.
