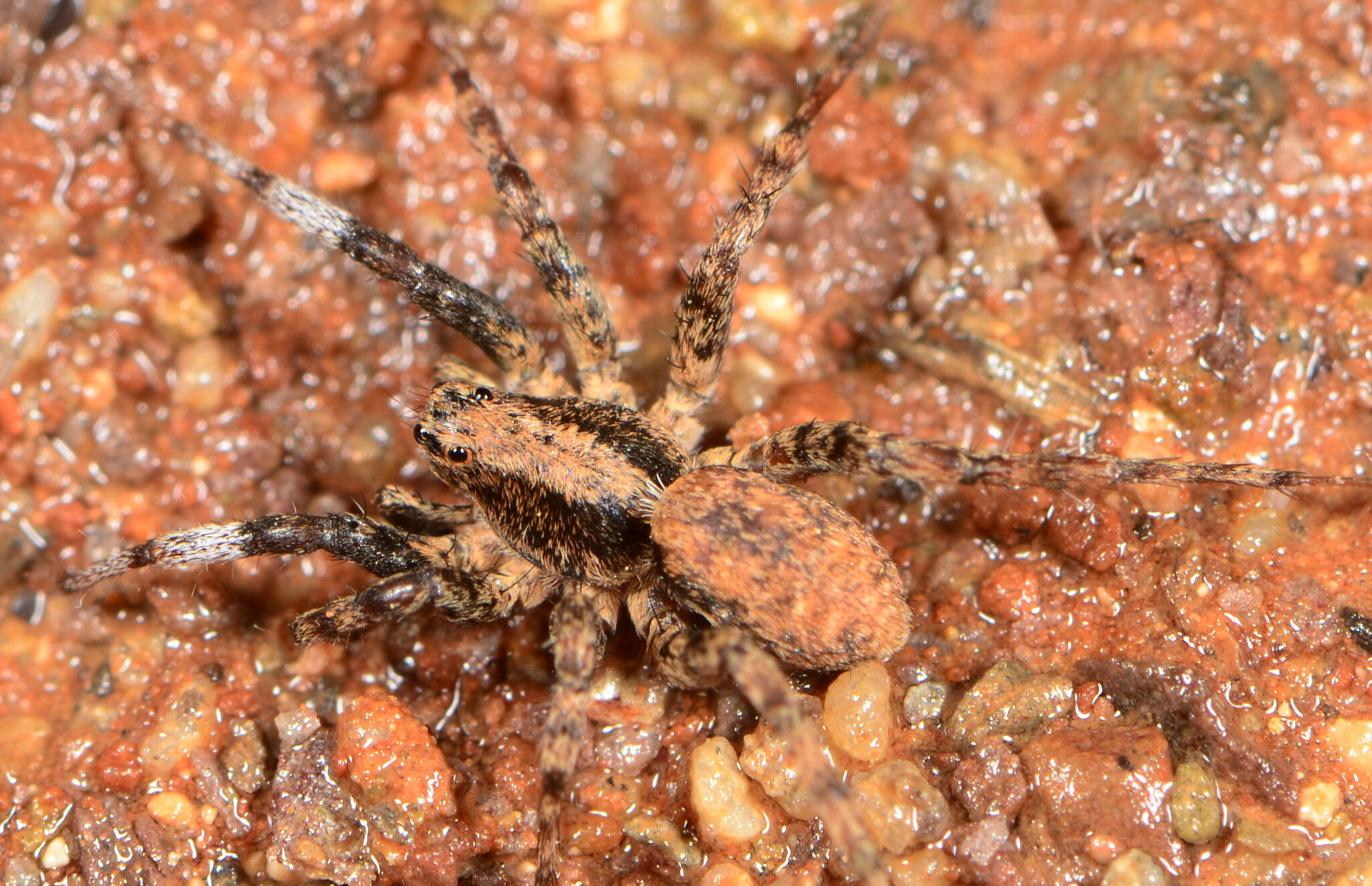
- male
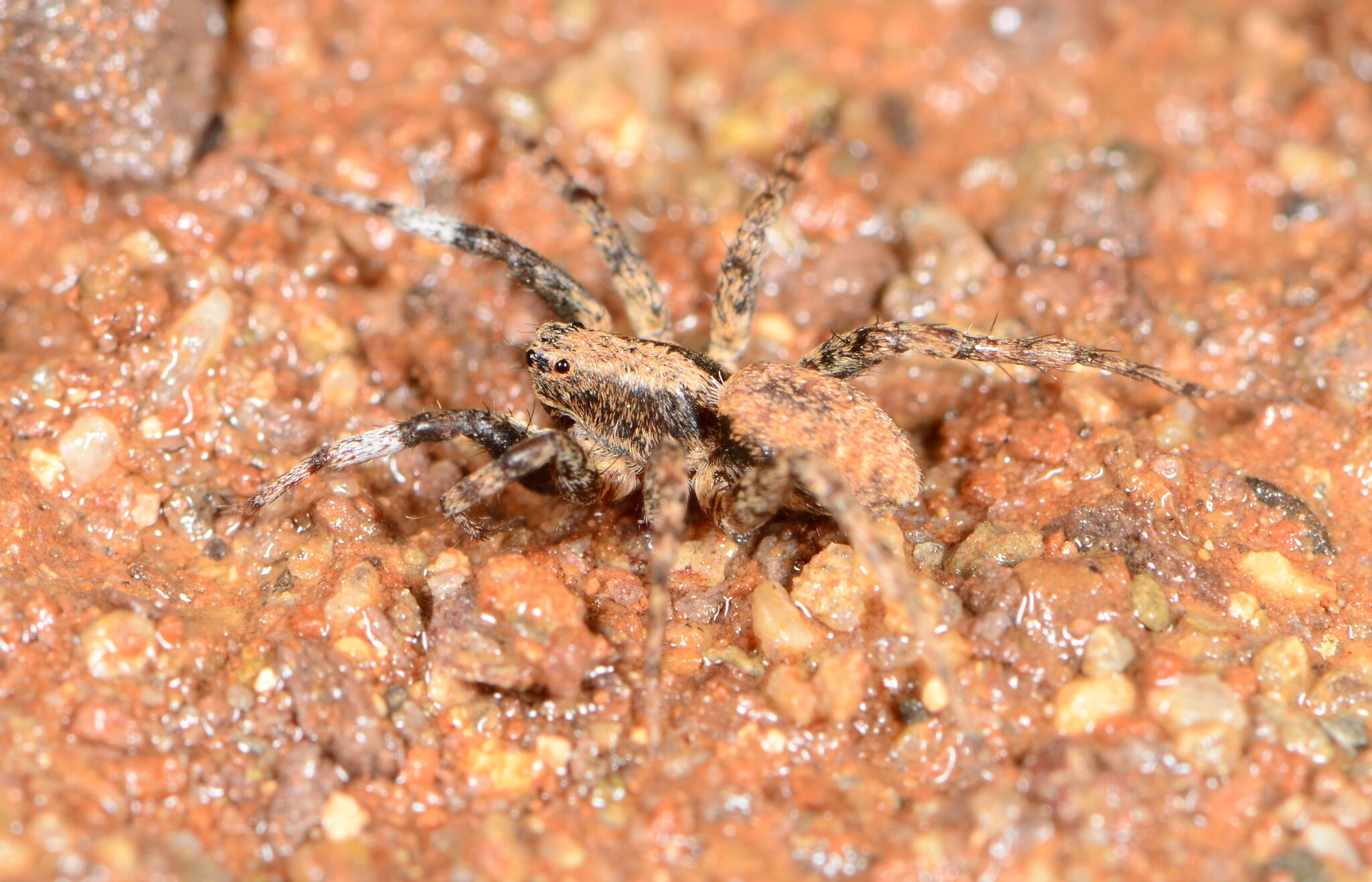
- male

Scientific classification
- Kingdom: Animalia
- Phylum: Arthropoda
- Subphylum: Chelicerata
- Class: Arachnida
- Order: Araneae
- Infraorder: Araneomorphae
- Family: Lycosidae
- Genus: Proevippa
- Species: P. lightfooti

Binomial name
- Proevippa lightfooti Purcell, 1903

= Proevippa lightfooti =

Bushy-leg Proevippa wolf spider

Species of spider

Proevippa lightfooti is a species of spider in the family Lycosidae. It is endemic to South Africa and is commonly known as the bushy-leg Proevippa wolf spider.

== Distribution ==
Proevippa lightfooti is only found in South Africa. It is endemic to the Western Cape province. Localities include Muizenberg, Bergvliet, Caledon, Kalkbay, Maitland Flats, Table Mountain National Park, Tulbagh, Kirstenbosch National Botanical Garden, Bontebok National Park, and Cederberg Wilderness Area.

== Habitat and ecology ==
Proevippa lightfooti is a free-running ground dwelling spider found in the Fynbos biome at altitudes ranging from 6 to 1,850 m.

== Conservation ==
Proevippa lightfooti is listed as Least Concern by the South African National Biodiversity Institute due to its wide range within the Western Cape. There are no known threats to the species and it is protected in Table Mountain National Park, Bontebok National Park, and Cederberg Wilderness Area.

== Taxonomy ==
Proevippa lightfooti was described by Purcell in 1903 from Muizenberg. The species was transferred to Chaleposa by Russell-Smith in 1981. Alderweireldt and Jocqué described the female in 1995 and redescribed the male. The species is known from both sexes.
