= Anomalomma =

Scientific classification
- Kingdom: Animalia
- Phylum: Arthropoda
- Subphylum: Chelicerata
- Class: Arachnida
- Order: Araneae
- Infraorder: Araneomorphae
- Family: Lycosidae
- Genus: Anomalomma; Simon

Species
- Anomalomma harishi Dyal, 1935 - Pakistan; Anomalomma lycosinum Simon, 1890 - Java; Anomalomma rhodesianum Roewer, 1960 - Zimbabwe

Genus of spiders

Anomalomma is a genus of spiders in the family Lycosidae. It was first described in 1890 by Simon. As of 2017, it contains 3 species.
