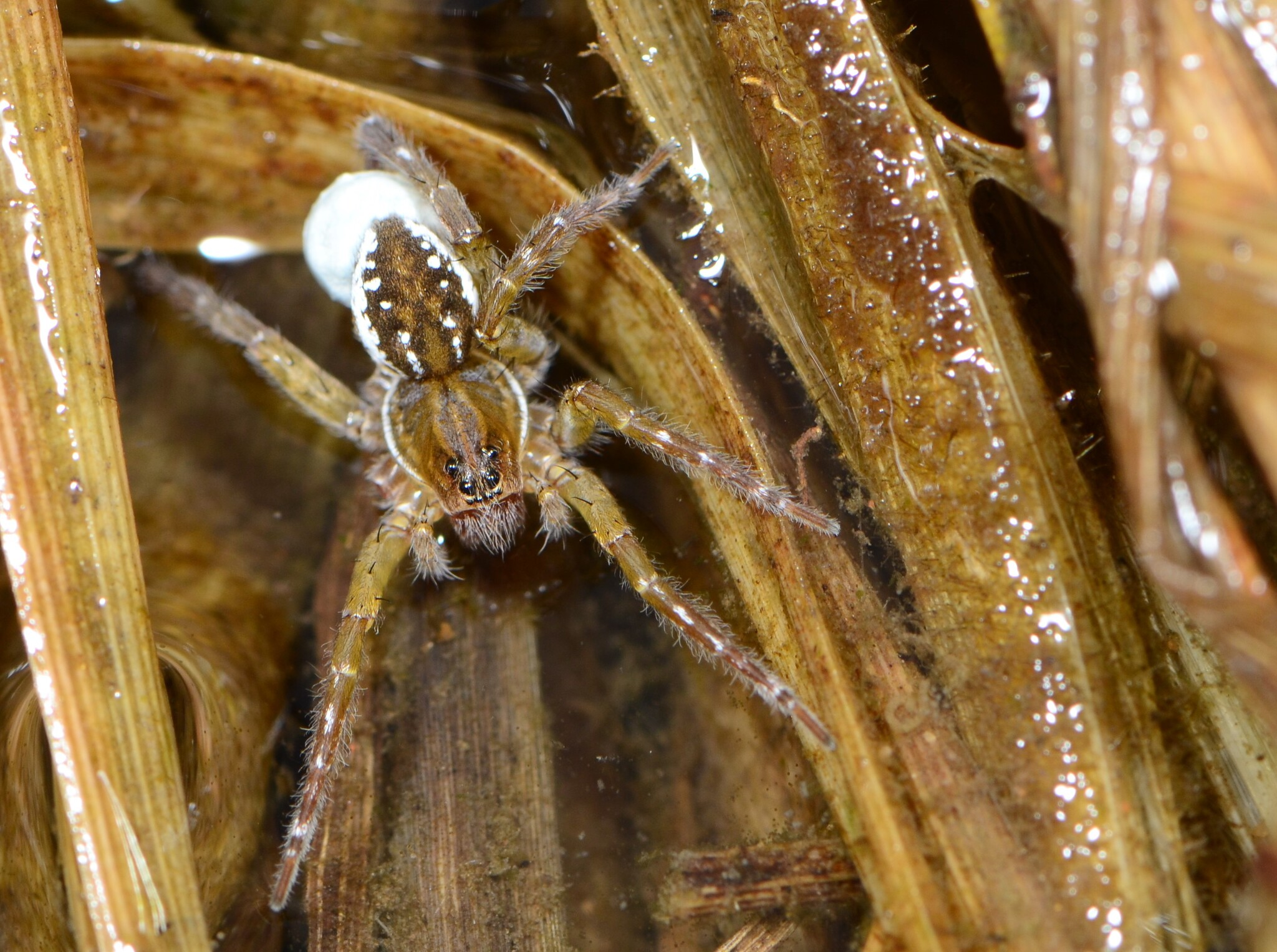
- Female
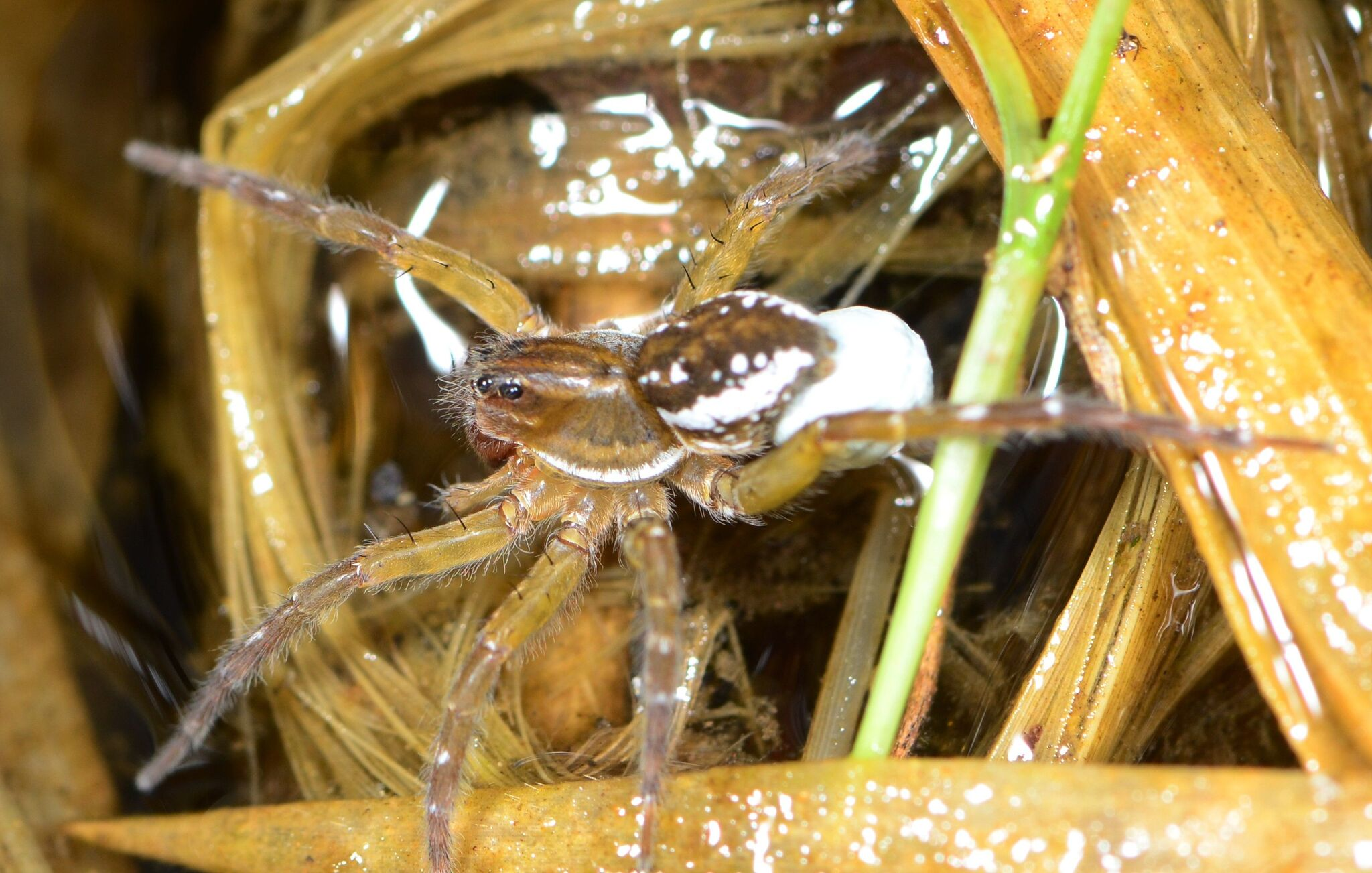
- Female

Scientific classification
- Kingdom: Animalia
- Phylum: Arthropoda
- Subphylum: Chelicerata
- Class: Arachnida
- Order: Araneae
- Infraorder: Araneomorphae
- Family: Lycosidae
- Genus: Pirata
- Species: P. africanus

Binomial name
- Pirata africanus (Roewer, 1960)

Synonyms
- Hippasa africana Roewer, 1960

= Pirata africanus =

African water wolf spider

Species of spider

Pirata africanus is a species of spider in the family Lycosidae. It is found in southern Africa and is commonly known as the African water wolf spider.

== Distribution ==
Pirata africanus is found in Namibia and South Africa. In South Africa, it is known from the provinces Limpopo, KwaZulu-Natal, and Mpumalanga. Notable locations include Kruger National Park, Mlazi River at Killarney Game Farm, and Nelspruit.

== Habitat and ecology ==
Pirata africanus is a free running ground spider associated with fresh water. The species is able to dive underneath water where individuals can stay for periods of time. It has been sampled from the Savanna biome at altitudes ranging from 7 to 418 m.

== Description ==
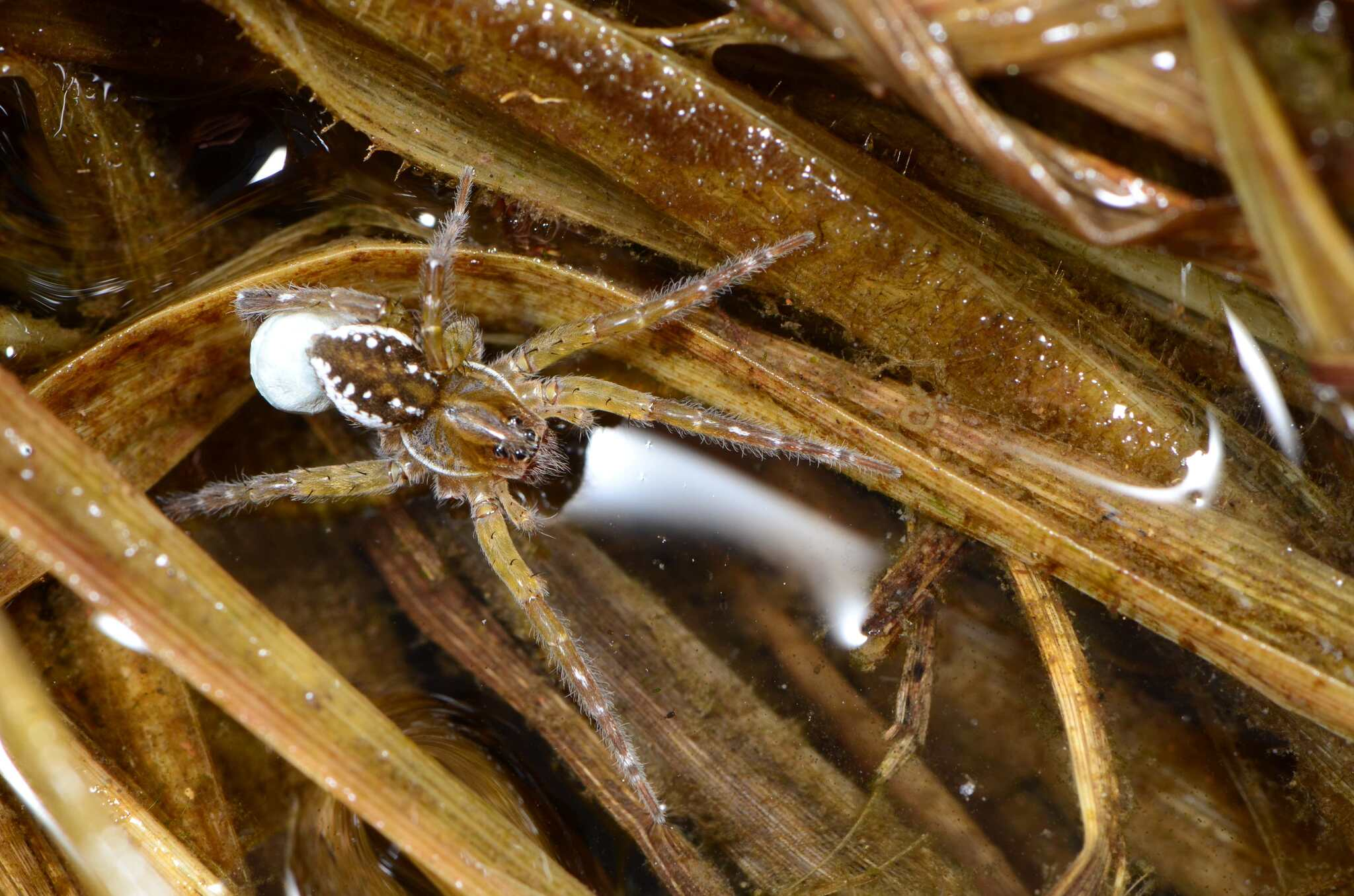
female

== Conservation ==
Pirata africanus is listed as Least Concern by the South African National Biodiversity Institute due to its wide geographical range. It is protected in Kruger National Park, though additional sampling is needed to collect males.

== Taxonomy ==
Pirata africanus was originally described by Roewer in 1960 as Hippasa africana from Namibia. The species was reviewed by Alderweireldt and Jocqué in 2005 and transferred to the genus Pirata. It is known only from females.
