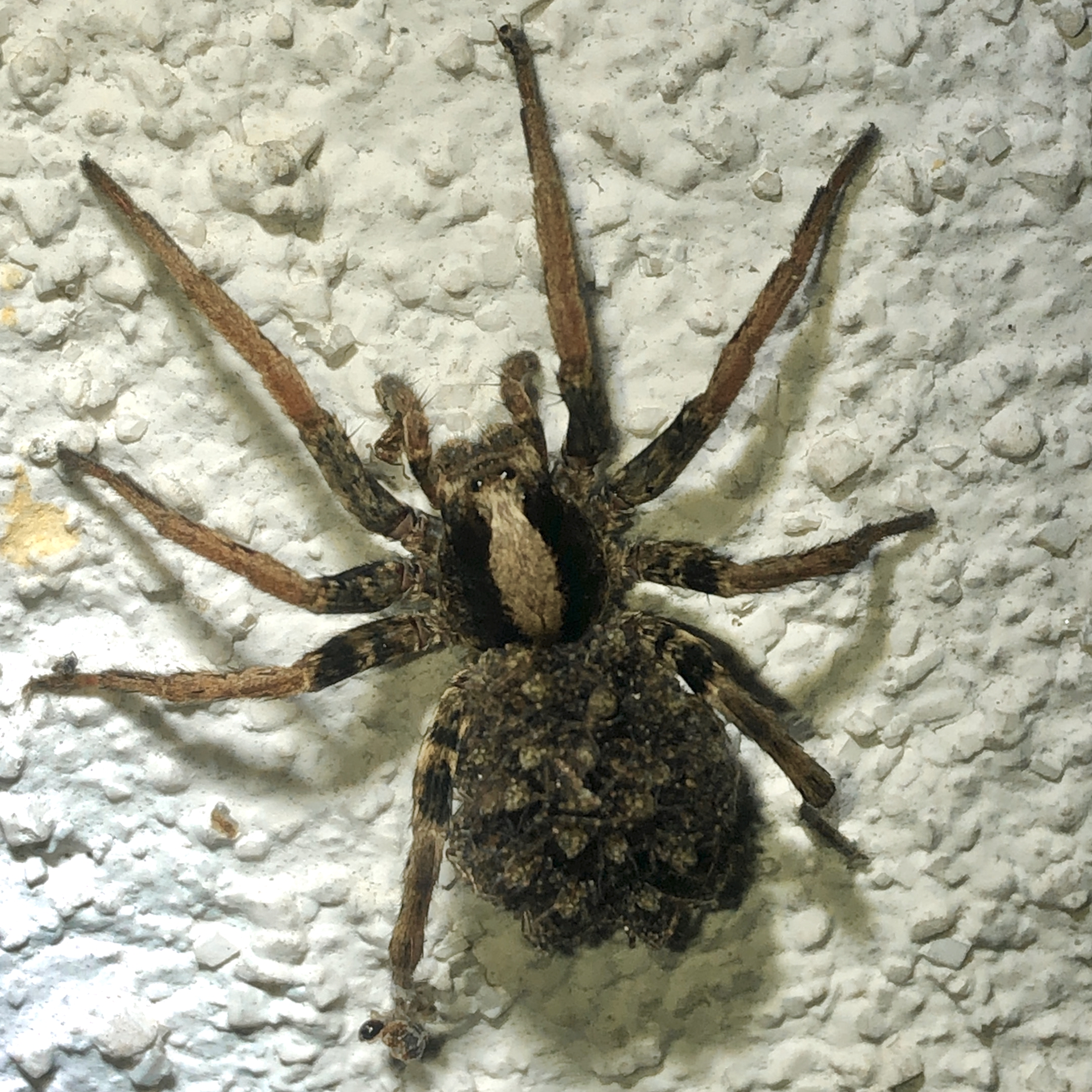
- female with spiderlings
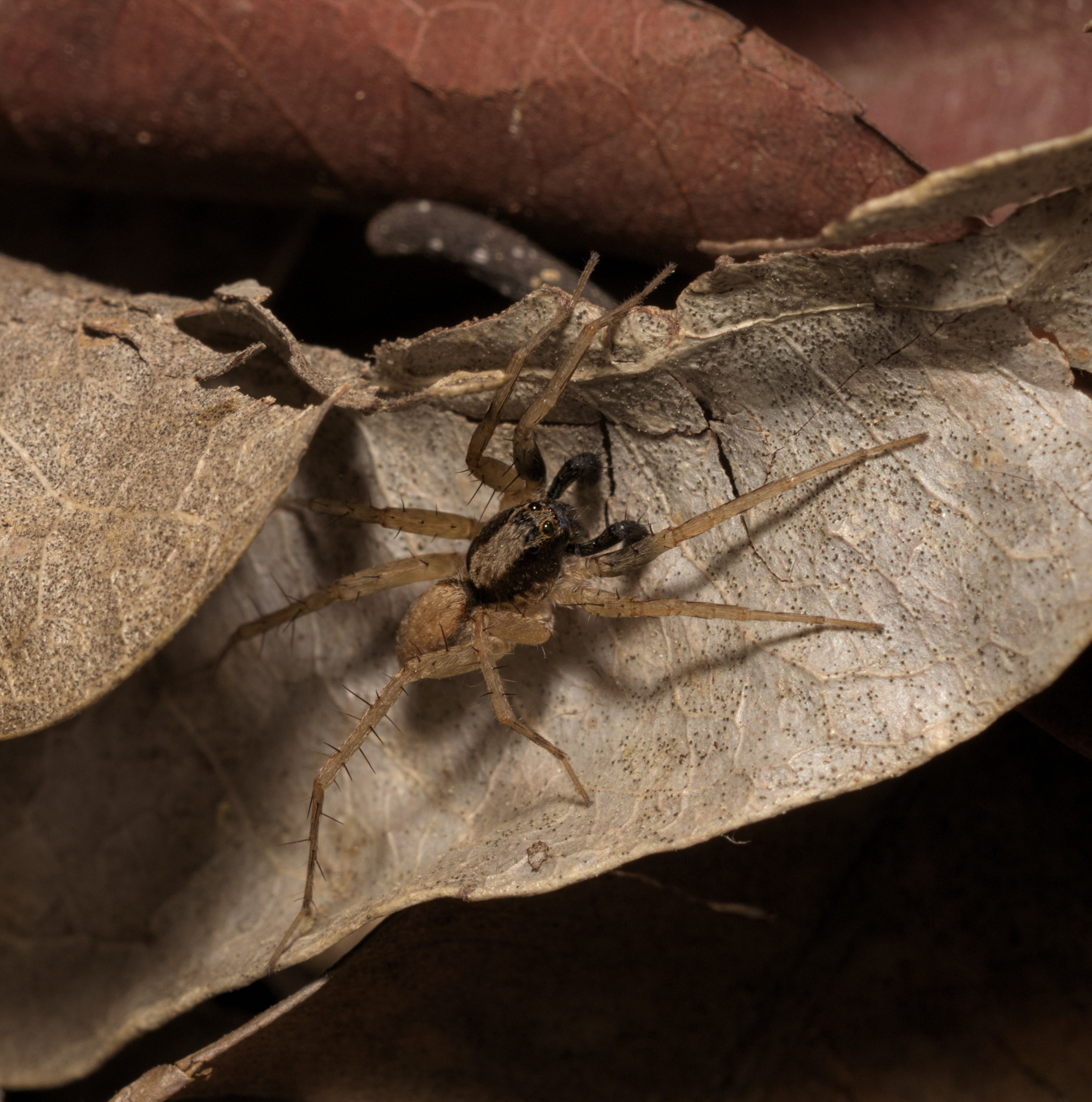
- male from Hong Kong

Scientific classification
- Kingdom: Animalia
- Phylum: Arthropoda
- Subphylum: Chelicerata
- Class: Arachnida
- Order: Araneae
- Infraorder: Araneomorphae
- Family: Lycosidae
- Genus: Pardosa
- Species: P. laura

Binomial name
- Pardosa laura Karsch, 1879

Synonyms
- Tarentula palus Dönitz & Strand, in Bösenberg & Strand, 1906; Pirata longipedis Saito, 1939; Pardosa diversa Tanaka, 1985

= Pardosa laura =

Species of wolf spider

Pardosa laura is a species of wolf spider in the family Lycosidae. It has a widespread distribution across East Asia.

== Distribution ==
P. laura is distributed across Russia (Far East), Korea, Japan, China, and Taiwan. The species is commonly found in mountainous grassland areas at the foot of hills and mountains.

== Habitat ==
The species is typically found in grasslands at the base of mountains and hills. It inhabits agricultural areas including rice fields and cotton fields across its range.

== Description ==
Pardosa laura is a medium-sized wolf spider with notable sexual dimorphism in coloration. Adult females measure 4.0–7.2 mm in body length, while males are smaller at 3.7–5.2 mm.

The carapace of females is dark reddish-brown, while males are almost entirely black. The anterior median eyes are slightly larger than the anterior lateral eyes. The clypeus is pale yellowish-brown and wider than the diameter of the anterior median eyes. The maxillae and labium are greyish-brown.

In females, the sternum is pale yellowish-brown with a reddish-brown U-shaped marking in the central area, while in males it is blackish-grey with a narrow yellowish-brown longitudinal stripe in the upper central portion. The dorsal abdomen of females is yellowish-brown with irregular dark brown markings, while males have a reddish-brown abdomen with six pairs of black spots arranged in rows on the posterior half.

The legs are generally yellowish-brown with ring patterns visible from the femur to the tibia, except for the whitish-yellow coxae and the dark brown tips of the first leg patellae. The pedipalps are dark brown except for the yellowish-brown patella, with white hairs at the tip of the femur and base of the patella, and numerous black hairs at the tip of the tibia.

== Life cycle ==
Adult females can be found from May to mid-September, while males have a shorter active period from May to early July. Egg sac formation occurs in July.

== Taxonomy ==
The species was first described by Friedrich Karsch in 1879 based on material from Japan. The taxonomic history of P. laura is complex, with several species names that have been synonymized with it over time, including Tarentula palus Dönitz & Strand, 1906, Pirata longipedis Saito, 1939, and Pardosa diversa Tanaka, 1985.

Type specimens are housed in the Senckenberg Museum in Frankfurt am Main, Germany (fragments) and the Museum für Naturkunde in Berlin, Germany (syntypes).
