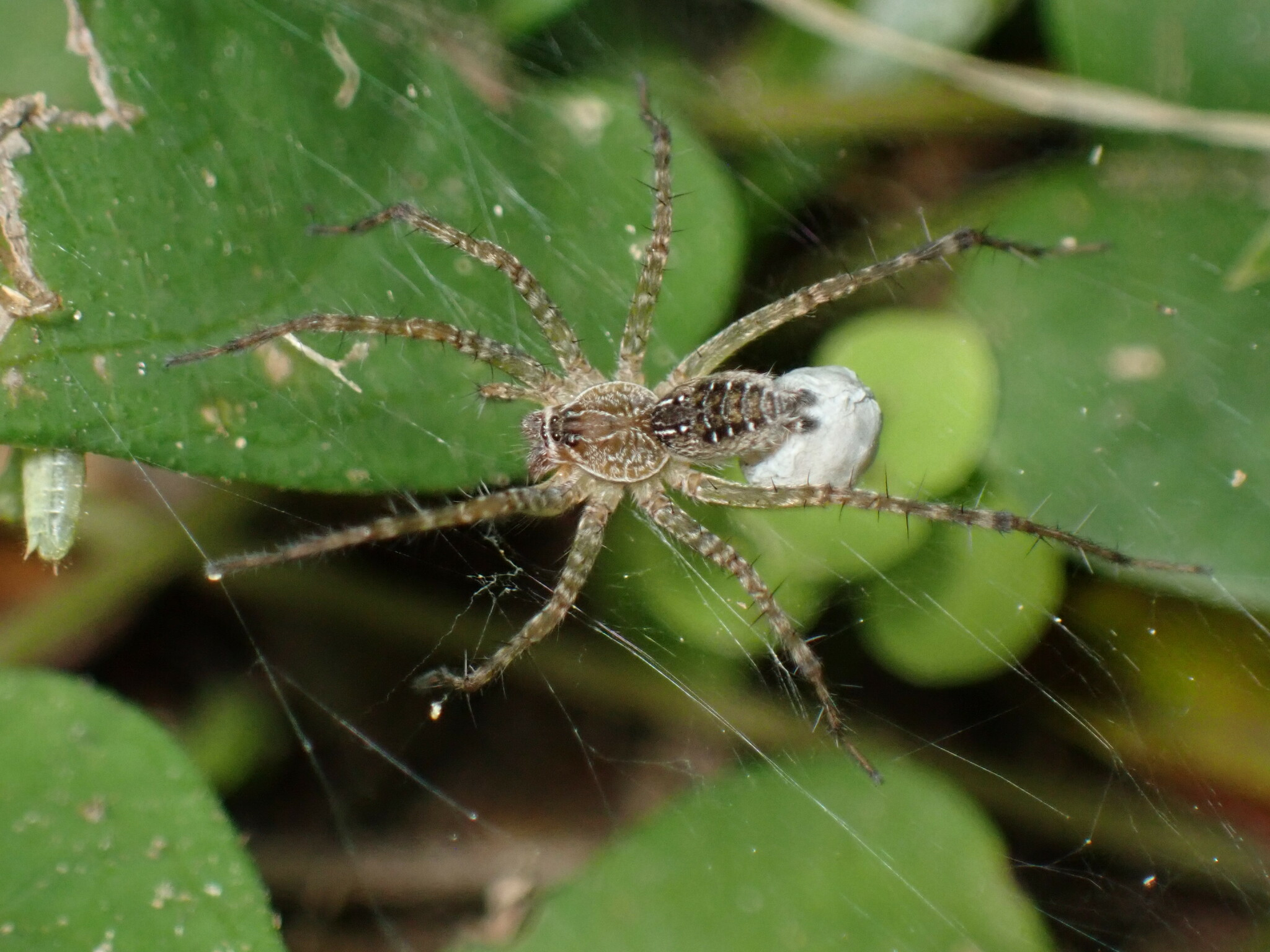
- female from Taiwan

Scientific classification
- Kingdom: Animalia
- Phylum: Arthropoda
- Subphylum: Chelicerata
- Class: Arachnida
- Order: Araneae
- Infraorder: Araneomorphae
- Family: Lycosidae
- Genus: Hippasa
- Species: H. holmerae

Binomial name
- Hippasa holmerae Thorell, 1895

Synonyms
- Hippasa holmerae sundaica Thorell, 1895; Hippasa jaihenensis Yin & Wang, 1980; Hippasa rimandoi Barrion, 1981; Hippasa sinsiloides Barrion, Barrion-Dupo & Heong, 2013

= Hippasa holmerae =

Lawn Wolf Spider

Species of wolf spider

Hippasa holmerae is a species of wolf spider in the family Lycosidae. It was first described by Tamerlan Thorell in 1895 based on specimens collected from Burma. The species is commonly known as the lawn wolf spider and has a wide distribution across Asia.

The species is named after Thorell's wife, Julia Holmer, who died in 1879.

== Distribution ==
H. holmerae has been recorded from India, Bangladesh, Myanmar, China, Taiwan, Laos, Singapore, and the Philippines. The species shows considerable geographic variation, with the subspecies H. h. sundaica originally described from Singapore by Thorell in 1895, though this is now considered synonymous with the main species.

In India, the species has been documented from several states including Manipur, Uttarakhand, and West Bengal. It is also found in agricultural regions across its range, where it plays an important ecological role as a predator of pest insects.

== Habitat and behavior ==
Unlike most wolf spiders, which are wandering hunters, Hippasa species construct funnel-shaped webs similar to those of funnel-web spiders. This web-building behavior is unusual within the Lycosidae family and represents an interesting example of convergent evolution.

The species inhabits a variety of environments including grasslands, agricultural areas, and suburban gardens. It has been observed in rice fields, where it serves as a beneficial predator of leafhoppers and planthoppers that damage crops. The spiders are often found in ground-level locations and may construct their webs among vegetation or in sheltered areas.

== Description ==
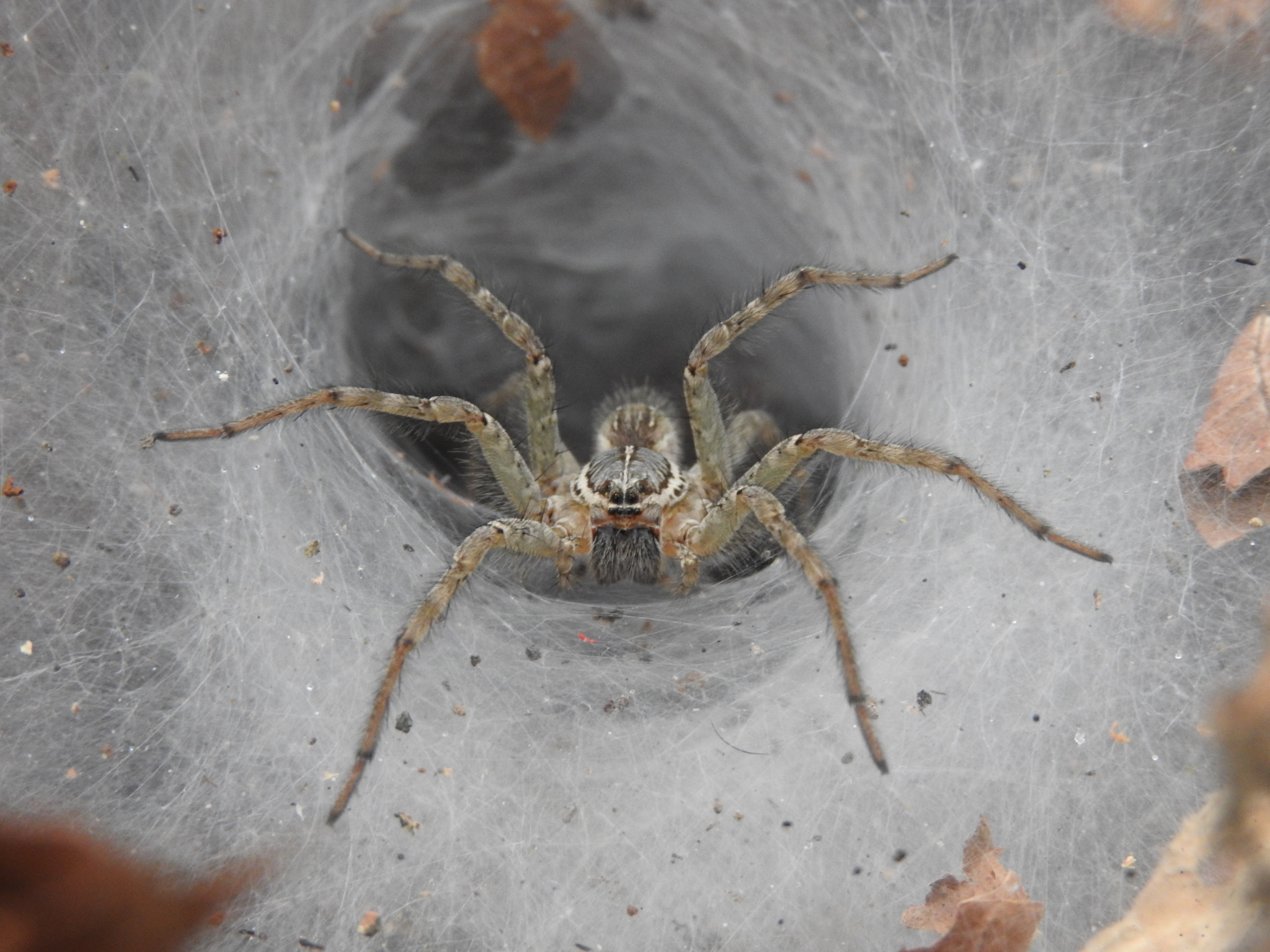
Lawn wolf spider from India

Hippasa holmerae exhibits the typical wolf spider body plan with a robust cephalothorax and abdomen. The cephalothorax is pale brown with distinctive white markings forming an elongated X-pattern, created by two pairs of diverging white lines in the cephalic and thoracic regions. The sternum is brownish with a longitudinal black band.

The abdomen has a blackish background with a series of clearer brown transverse spots and is variegated with brown, black, and white pubescence. White pubescence forms two parallel lines at the base and a series of transverse lines that are often interrupted in the middle.

Adult females range from 6-8 mm in body length, while males are typically slightly smaller at around 7.25 mm. The legs are relatively long, with the fourth pair being nearly five times the length of the cephalothorax in females.

== Taxonomy ==
The species has a complex taxonomic history with several synonyms. The subspecies H. h. sundaica, described by Thorell from Singapore specimens, was later synonymized with the main species by Bonnet in 1957. Additionally, Hippasa jaihenensis Yin & Wang, 1980, Hippasa rimandoi Barrion, 1981, and Hippasa sinsiloides Barrion, Barrion-Dupo & Heong, 2013 have all been determined to be junior synonyms of H. holmerae.

Recent molecular and morphological studies have helped clarify the species boundaries within the genus Hippasa, confirming the wide-ranging nature of H. holmerae and its morphological variability across different geographic populations.
