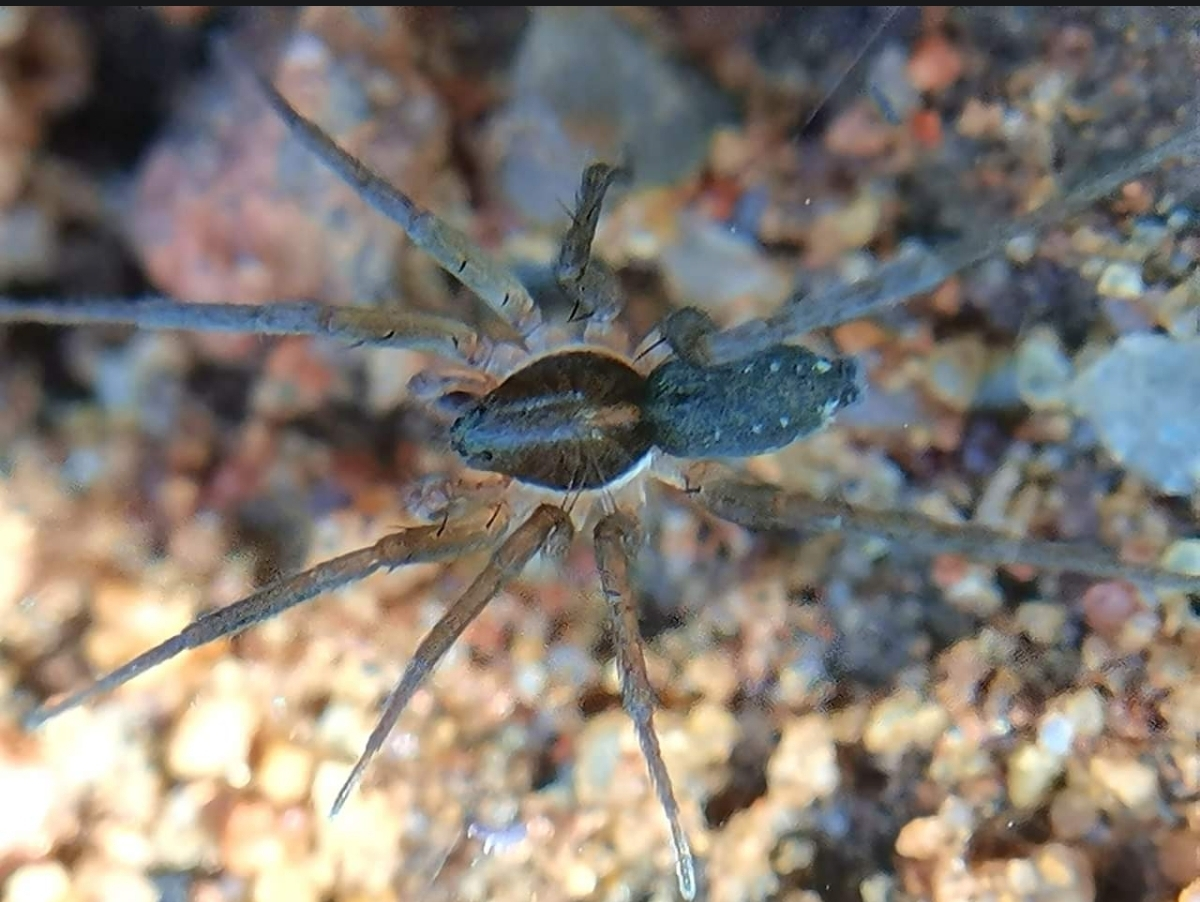

Scientific classification
- Kingdom: Animalia
- Phylum: Arthropoda
- Subphylum: Chelicerata
- Class: Arachnida
- Order: Araneae
- Infraorder: Araneomorphae
- Family: Lycosidae
- Genus: Hippasa
- Species: H. elienae

Binomial name
- Hippasa elienae Alderweireldt & Jocqué, 2005

= Hippasa elienae =

Tanzania funnel-web wolf spider

Species of spider

Hippasa elienae is a species of spider in the family Lycosidae. It is found in East Africa and South Africa, and is commonly known as the Tanzania funnel-web wolf spider.

== Distribution ==
Hippasa elienae is found in Kenya, Tanzania, and South Africa. In South Africa, it is recorded from Limpopo province, including Blouberg Nature Reserve, Little Leigh in the Western Soutpansberg, and Tshipise.

== Habitat and ecology ==
This species is a ground dweller that makes sheet-webs in low vegetation.

It has been sampled from the Savanna biome at altitudes ranging from 455 to 1146 m.

== Conservation ==
The species has a large geographic range in Africa. In South Africa, it is protected in Blouberg Nature Reserve. There are no significant threats to the species.

== Taxonomy ==
The species was described by Alderweireldt and Jocqué in 2005 from Tanzania. It is known only from females.
