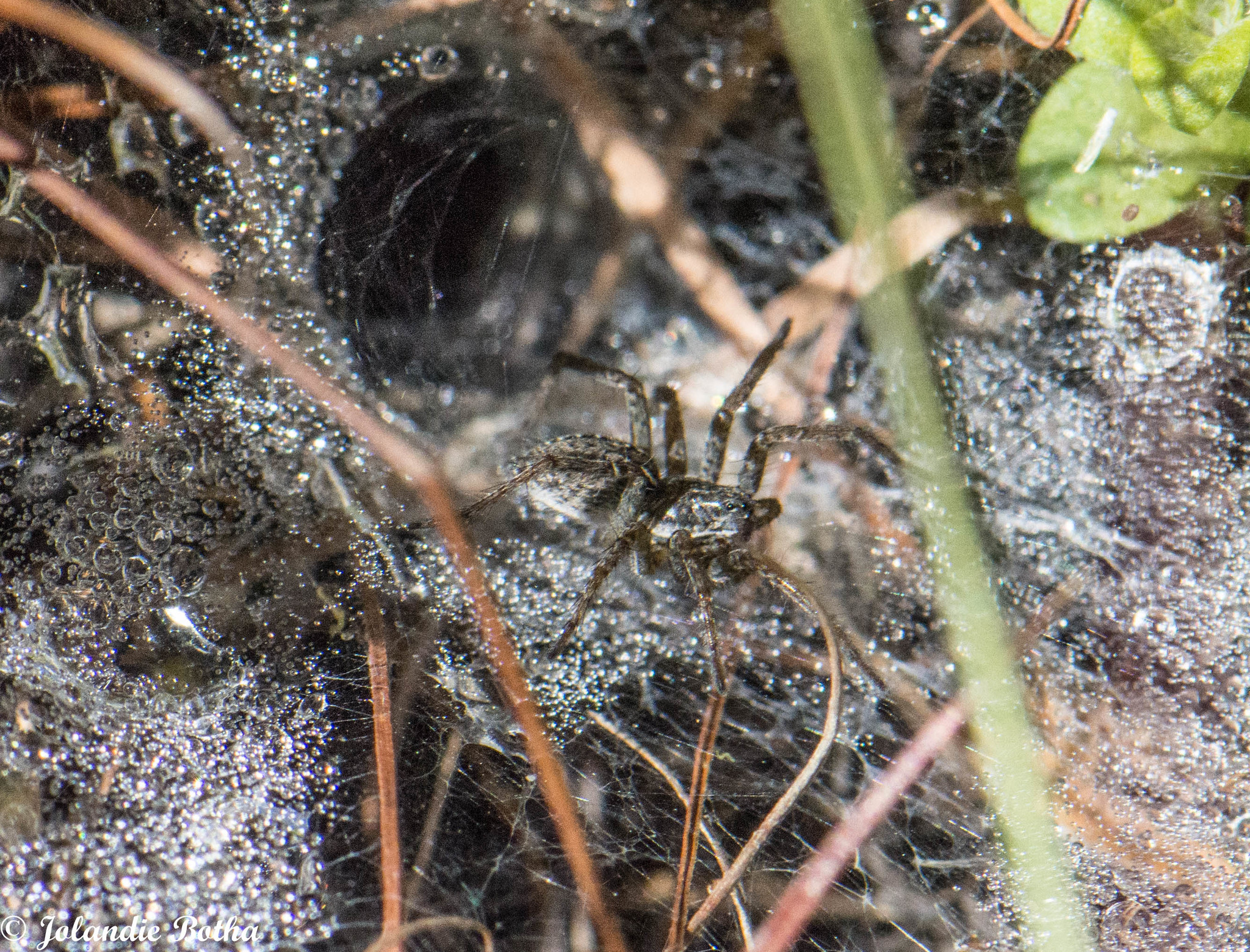

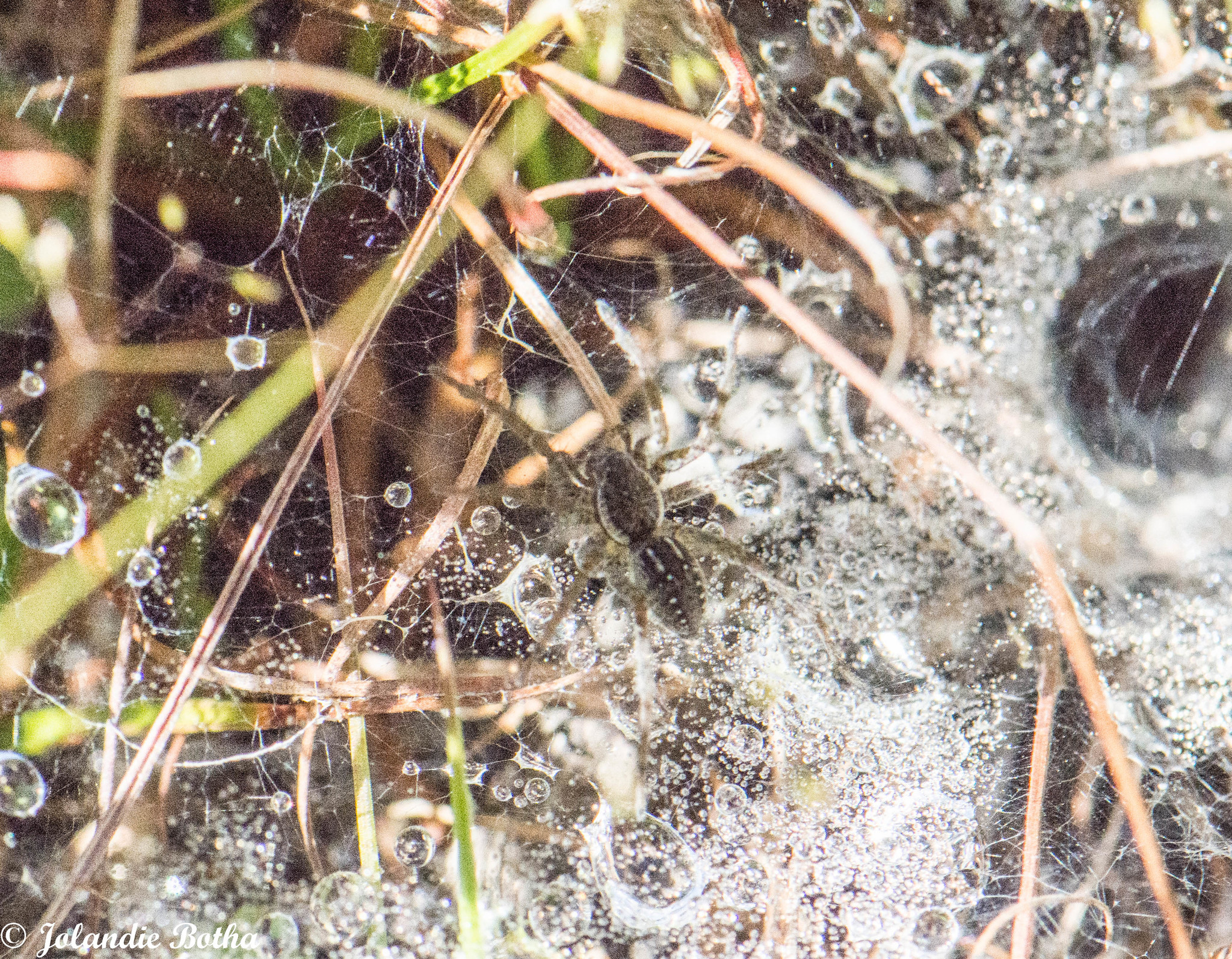

Scientific classification
- Kingdom: Animalia
- Phylum: Arthropoda
- Subphylum: Chelicerata
- Class: Arachnida
- Order: Araneae
- Infraorder: Araneomorphae
- Family: Lycosidae
- Genus: Hippasa
- Species: H. funerea

Binomial name
- Hippasa funerea Lessert, 1925

= Hippasa funerea =

Popela's funnel-web wolf spider

Species of spider

Hippasa funerea is a species of spider in the family Lycosidae. It is found in southern Africa and is commonly known as Popela's funnel-web wolf spider.

== Distribution ==
Hippasa funerea is found in Botswana, Lesotho, and South Africa. In South Africa, it is recorded from Eastern Cape, Free State, Gauteng, KwaZulu-Natal, Mpumalanga, and Western Cape.

== Habitat and ecology ==
This species is a ground dweller that makes sheet-webs in low vegetation.

It has been sampled from the Grassland, Fynbos, Thicket, and Savanna biomes at altitudes ranging from 36 to 2785 m.

== Description ==
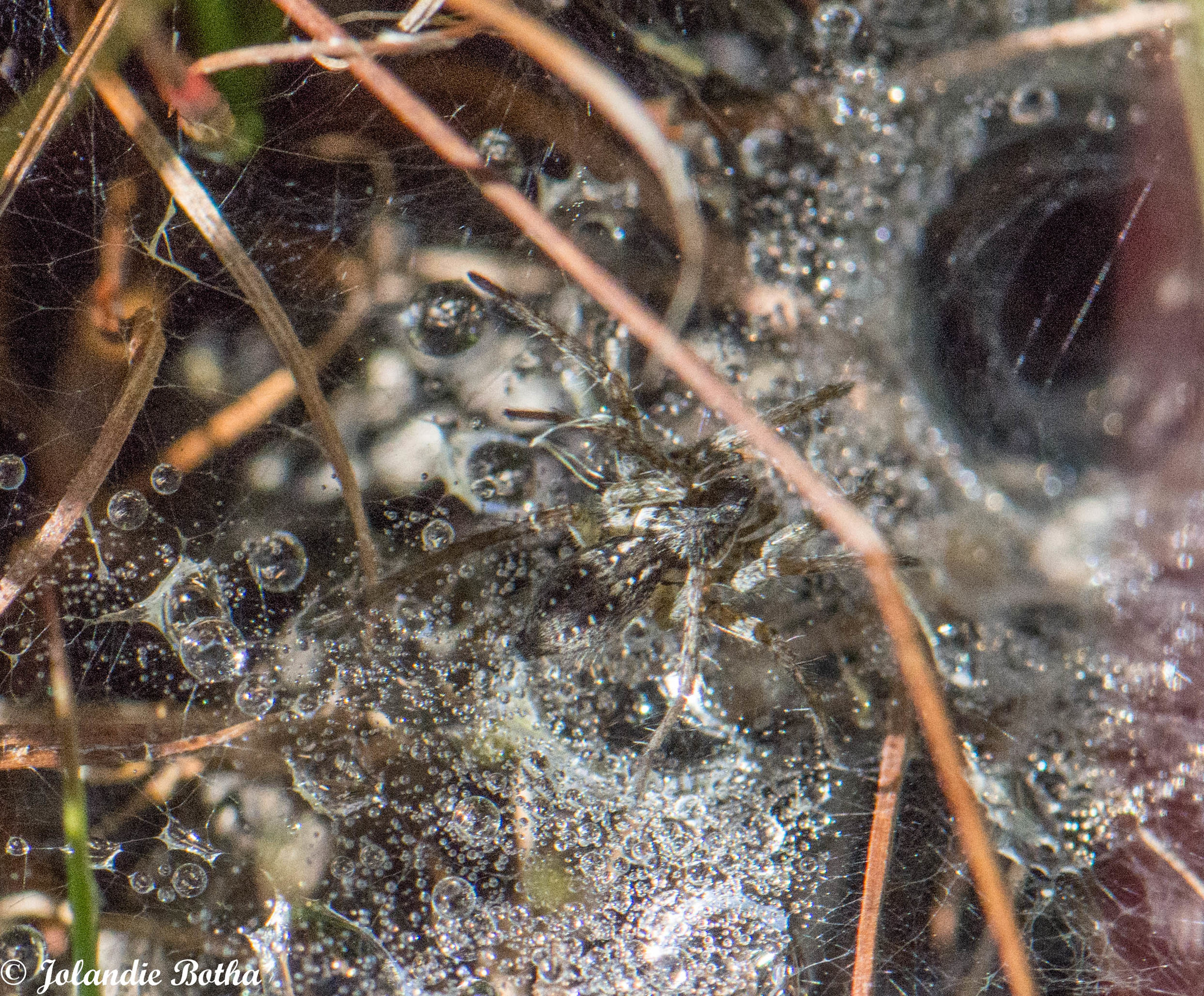

== Conservation ==
Hippasa funerea has a large geographic range and is protected in five protected areas. There are no significant threats to the species.

== Taxonomy ==
The species was originally described by Lessert in 1925 from Popela in KwaZulu-Natal and later revised by Alderweireldt and Jocqué in 2005. It is known from both sexes.
