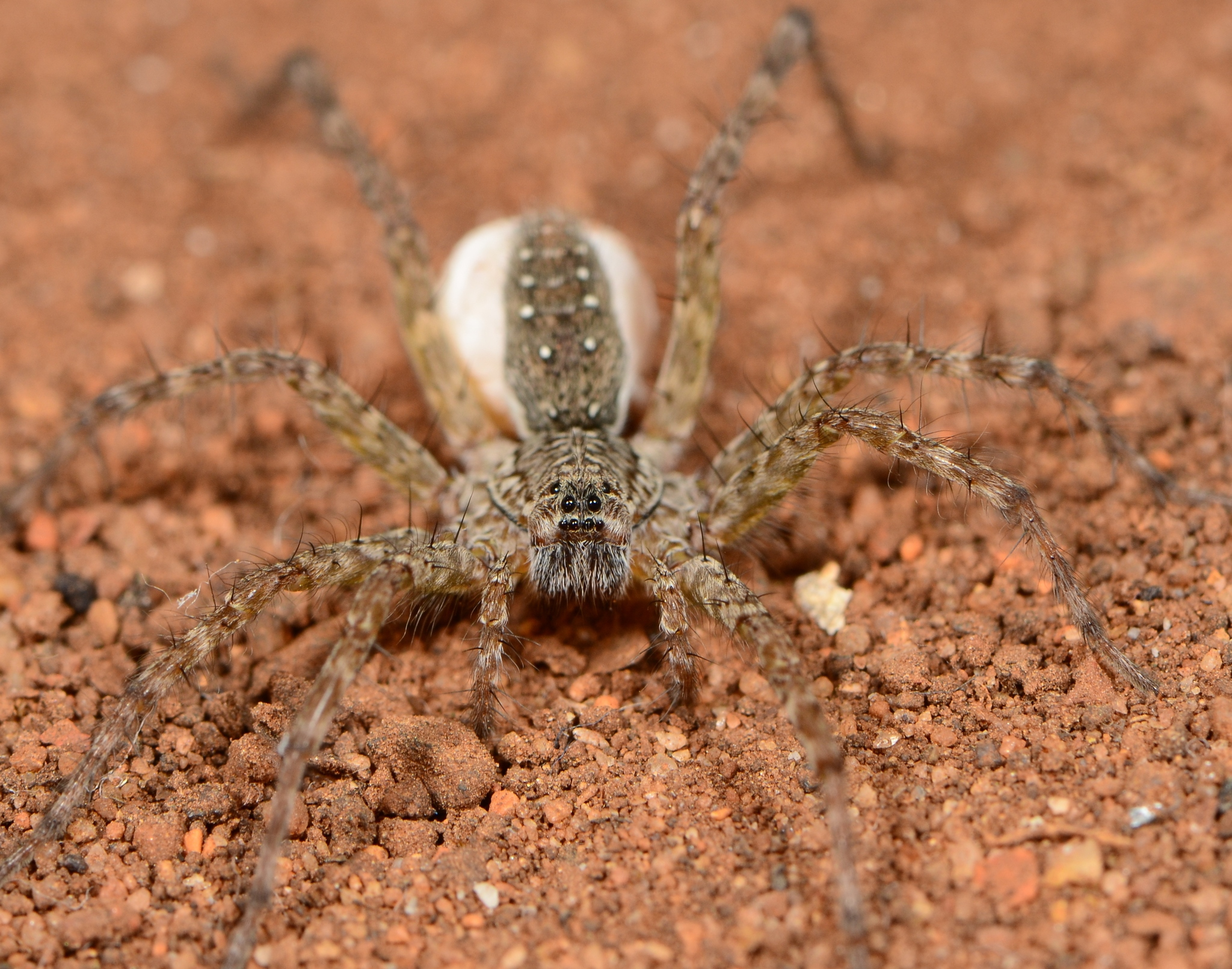
- female with egg sac
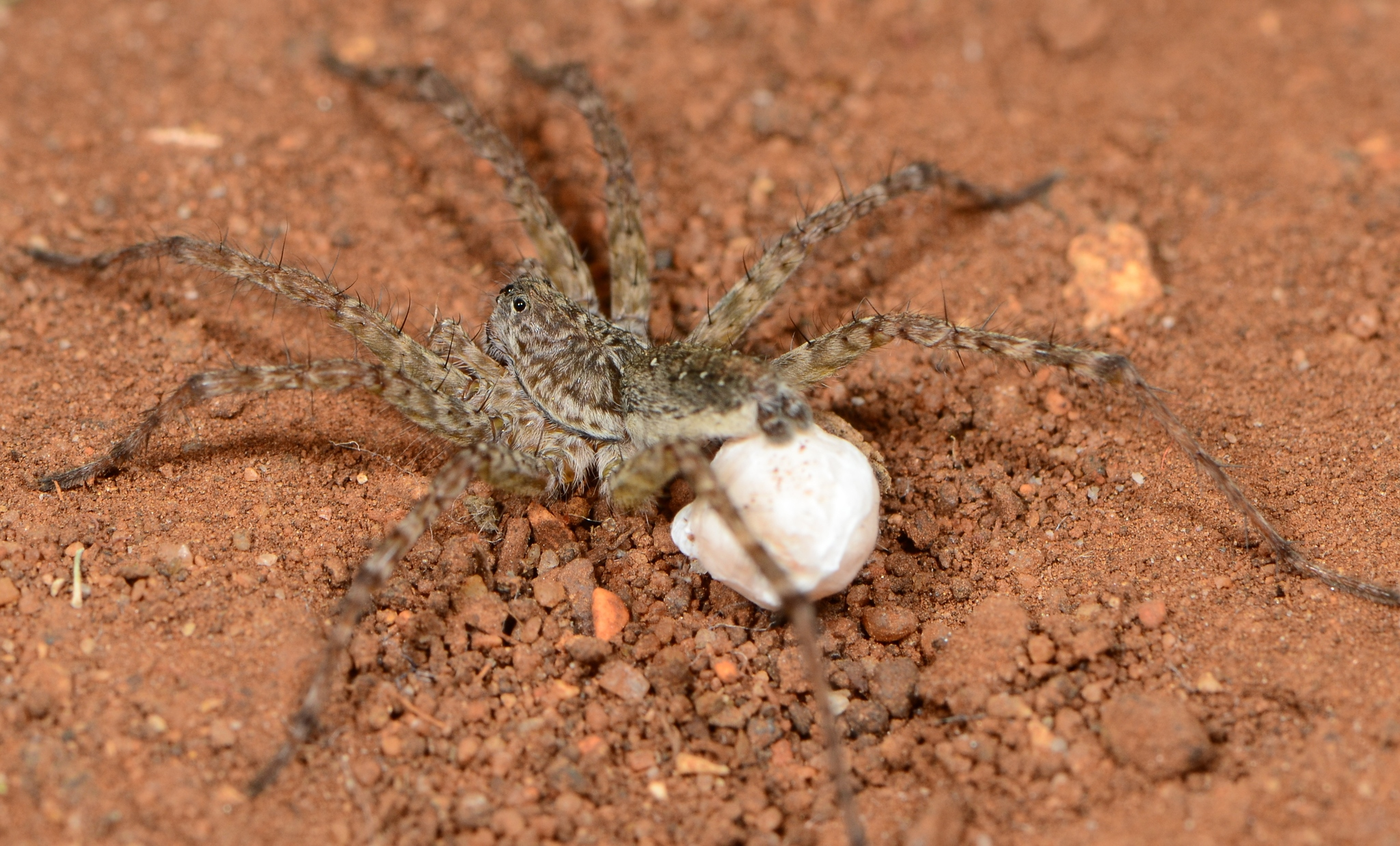
- female with egg sac

Scientific classification
- Kingdom: Animalia
- Phylum: Arthropoda
- Subphylum: Chelicerata
- Class: Arachnida
- Order: Araneae
- Infraorder: Araneomorphae
- Family: Lycosidae
- Genus: Hippasa
- Species: H. australis

Binomial name
- Hippasa australis Lawrence, 1927

= Hippasa australis =

African funnel-web wolf spider

Species of spider

Hippasa australis is a species of spider in the family Lycosidae. It is found in several southern African countries and is commonly known as the African funnel-web wolf spider.

== Distribution ==
Hippasa australis is found in Botswana, Malawi, Mozambique, Namibia, Eswatini, Lesotho, and South Africa.

In South Africa, it occurs in Eastern Cape, Free State, Gauteng, KwaZulu-Natal, Limpopo, and Mpumalanga provinces, with numerous recorded localities.

== Habitat and ecology ==
This species is a ground dweller that makes sheet-webs in low vegetation.

It is commonly found in Grassland and Savanna biomes at altitudes ranging from 1 to 2102 m.

== Conservation ==
The species has a very large range and is protected in more than ten protected areas across southern Africa. There are no significant threats to the species.

== Taxonomy ==
The species was originally described by Lawrence in 1927 from Ingwavuma in KwaZulu-Natal. It was later revised by Alderweireldt and Jocqué in 2005.
