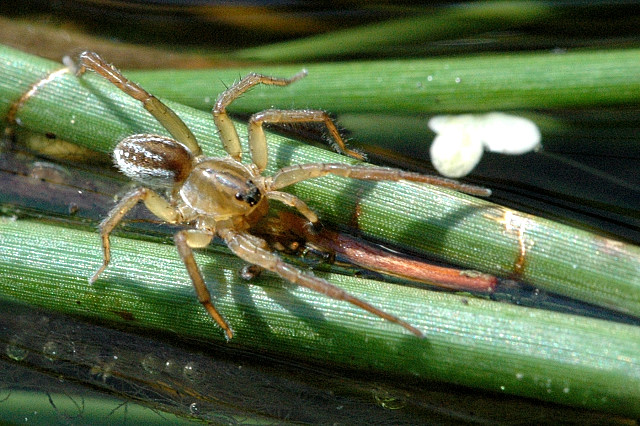

Scientific classification
- Kingdom: Animalia
- Phylum: Arthropoda
- Subphylum: Chelicerata
- Class: Arachnida
- Order: Araneae
- Infraorder: Araneomorphae
- Family: Lycosidae
- Genus: Pirata
- Species: P. piraticus

Binomial name
- Pirata piraticus (Clerck, 1757)

= Pirata piraticus =

Species of spider

Pirata piraticus is a species of wolf spider in the family Lycosidae. It is found in North America, Europe, Turkey, Caucasus, a range from Russia (European to Far East), Central Asia, China, and Japan.
