= Pirata sedentarius =

Scientific classification
- Kingdom: Animalia
- Phylum: Arthropoda
- Subphylum: Chelicerata
- Class: Arachnida
- Order: Araneae
- Infraorder: Araneomorphae
- Family: Lycosidae
- Genus: Pirata
- Species: P. sedentarius

Binomial name
- Pirata sedentarius Montgomery, 1904

Species of spider

Pirata sedentarius is a species of wolf spider in the family Lycosidae. It is found in North America and Greater Antilles.
