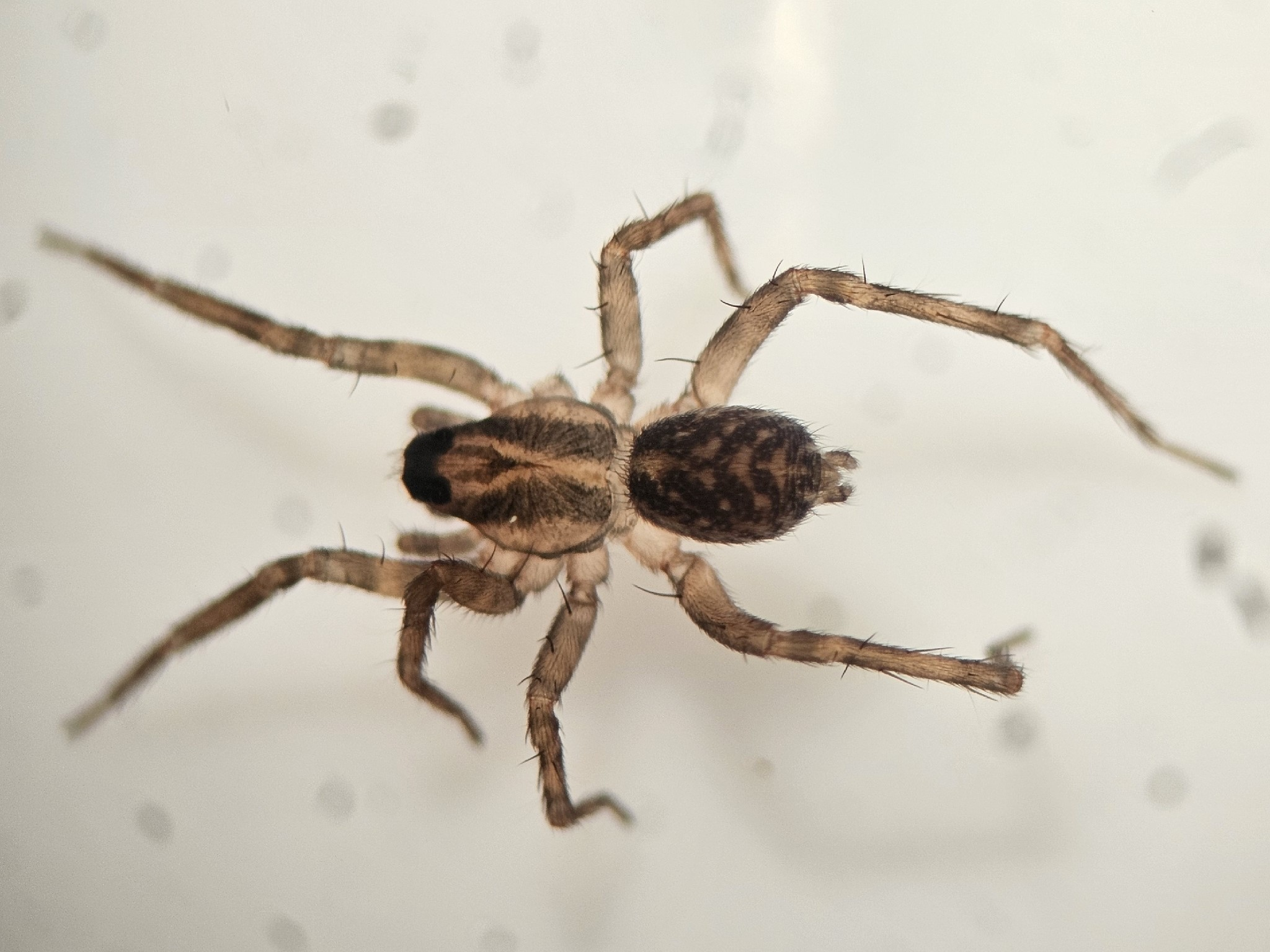

Scientific classification
- Kingdom: Animalia
- Phylum: Arthropoda
- Subphylum: Chelicerata
- Class: Arachnida
- Order: Araneae
- Infraorder: Araneomorphae
- Family: Lycosidae
- Genus: Pirata
- Species: P. aspirans

Binomial name
- Pirata aspirans Chamberlin, 1904

= Pirata aspirans =

Species of spider

Pirata aspirans is a species of wolf spider in the family Lycosidae. It is found in the United States and Canada.
