= Pirata alachuus =

Scientific classification
- Kingdom: Animalia
- Phylum: Arthropoda
- Subphylum: Chelicerata
- Class: Arachnida
- Order: Araneae
- Infraorder: Araneomorphae
- Family: Lycosidae
- Genus: Pirata
- Species: P. alachuus

Binomial name
- Pirata alachuus Gertsch & Wallace, 1935

Species of spider

Pirata alachuus is a species of wolf spider in the family Lycosidae. It is found in the United States.
