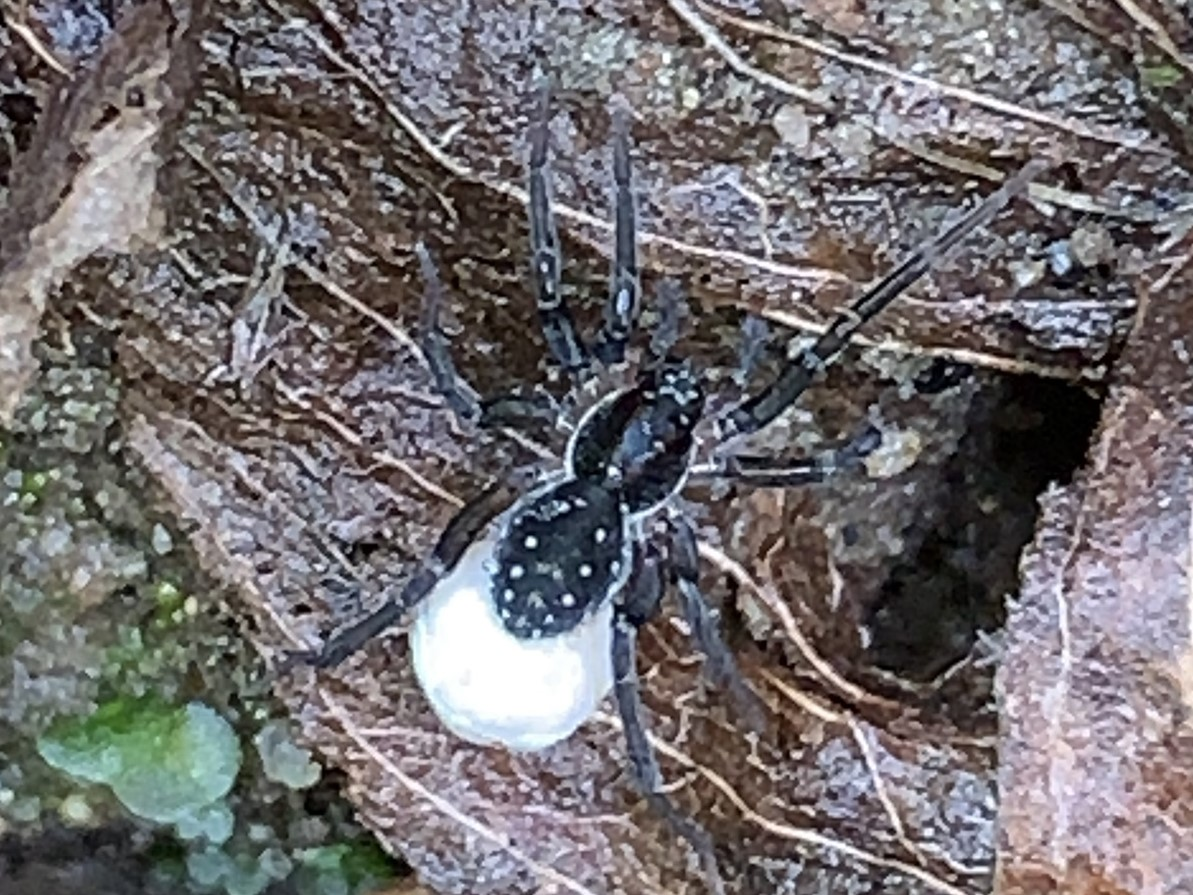
- Female carrying egg sac

Scientific classification
- Kingdom: Animalia
- Phylum: Arthropoda
- Subphylum: Chelicerata
- Class: Arachnida
- Order: Araneae
- Infraorder: Araneomorphae
- Family: Lycosidae
- Genus: Pirata
- Species: P. montanus

Binomial name
- Pirata montanus Emerton, 1885

Synonyms
- Several, including: Pirata elegans Stone, 1890

= Pirata montanus =

Species of spider

Pirata montanus is a species of wolf spider from the family Lycosidae. It can be found in the USA, Canada and Russia.
