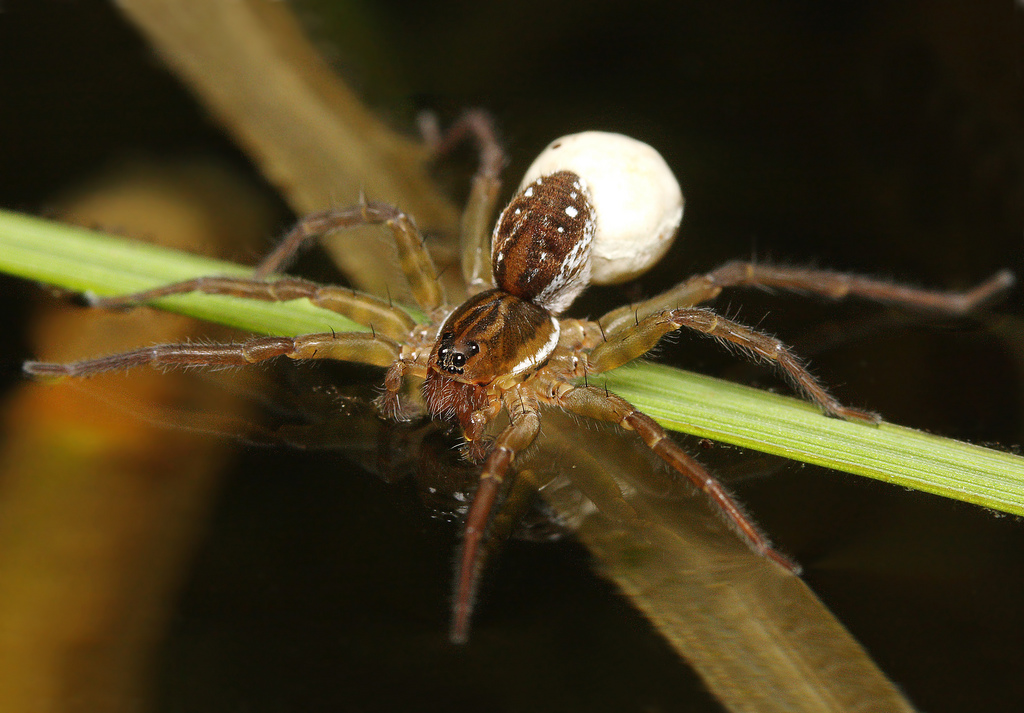
- Pirata piraticus
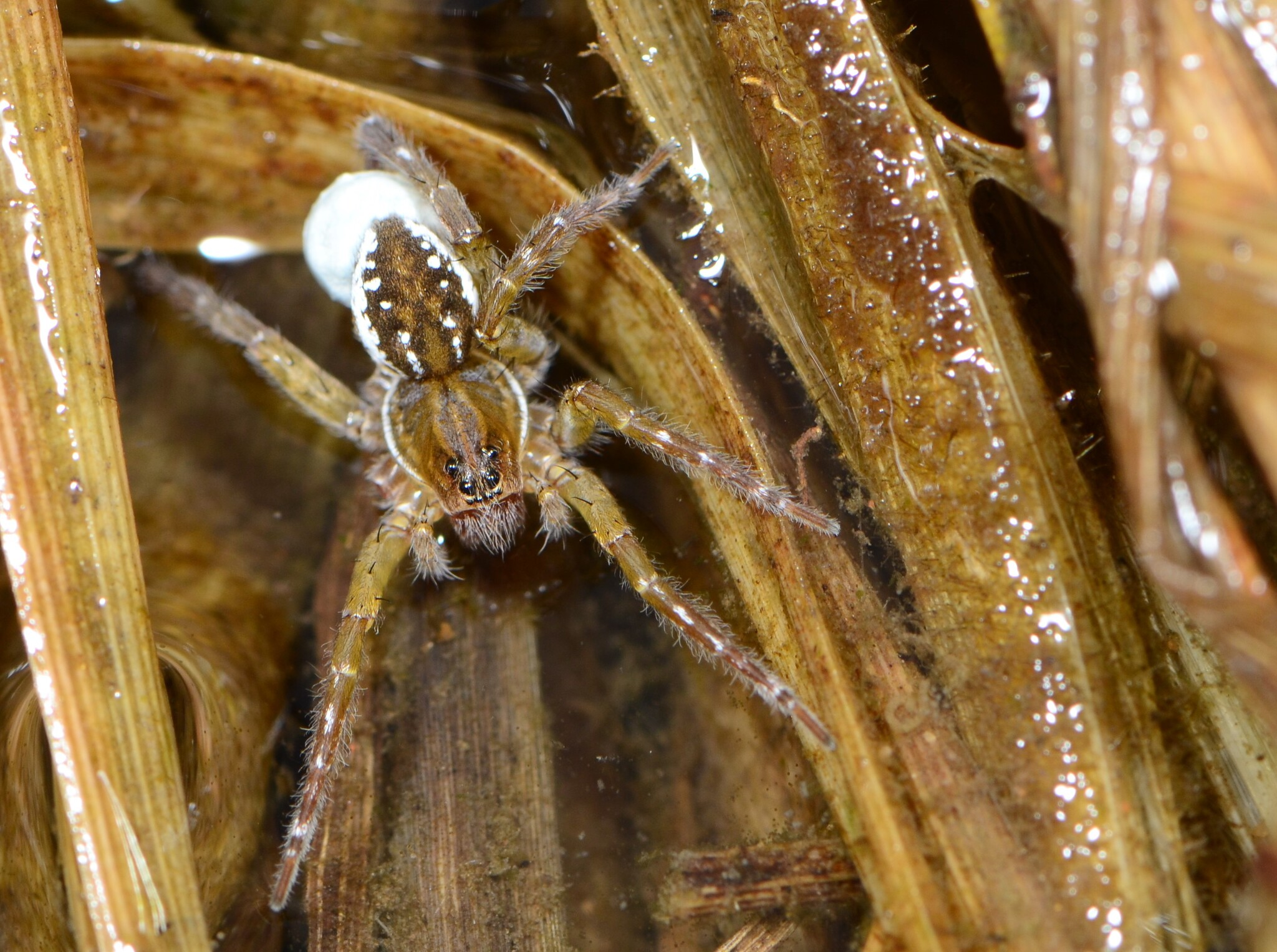
- Pirata africanus

Scientific classification
- Kingdom: Animalia
- Phylum: Arthropoda
- Subphylum: Chelicerata
- Class: Arachnida
- Order: Araneae
- Infraorder: Araneomorphae
- Family: Lycosidae
- Genus: Pirata; Sundevall, 1833

= Pirata (spider) =

Genus of spiders

Pirata is a genus of wolf spiders (family Lycosidae), commonly known as pirate wolf spiders.

== Distribution ==
Spiders in this genus have been described from Africa, Asia, Europe, North America, with few reaching down to Argentina.

They are found in most of Europe.

== Lifestyle ==
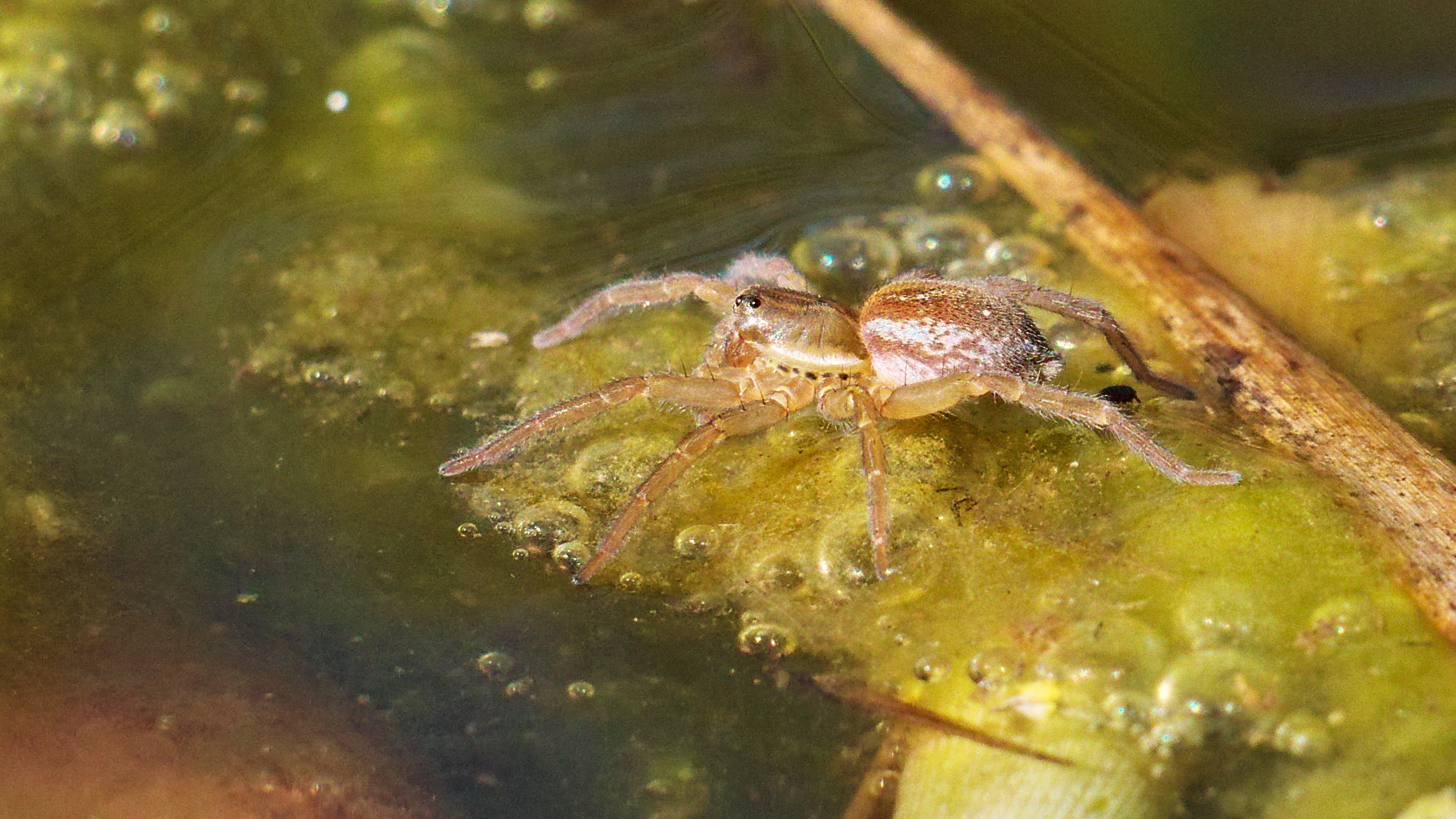
female P. piraticus

Members of Pirata occur typically around bodies of water, upon which they run with great ease, or in bogs, swamps and marshes. The spiders dive into the water and an air bubble is trapped around the body for breathing. The water wolf spiders live on plants close to dams and rivers and in contrast with grass-living wolf spiders, they are more social and several spiders can live together on one water plant.

== Description ==
Pirata species range from 6–7 mm in total length for females and 5–6 mm for males.

The carapace has a head region that is slightly flattened, and is as high in the thoracic region as in the cephalic region. The cephalic region has a dark V-shaped mark within the central pale region. The anterior eye row is not procurved. There is a narrow white band around the edge.

The abdomen is dark brown with two distinct rows of white spots. Legs are long, the same colour as the body, and strongly mottled. There are spots on the abdomen and pale brown to dark grey mottling.

== Species ==
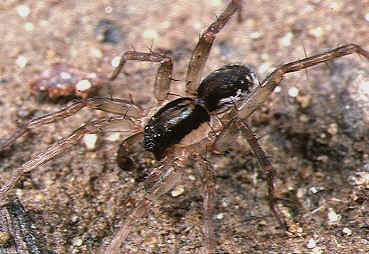
P. iriomotensis

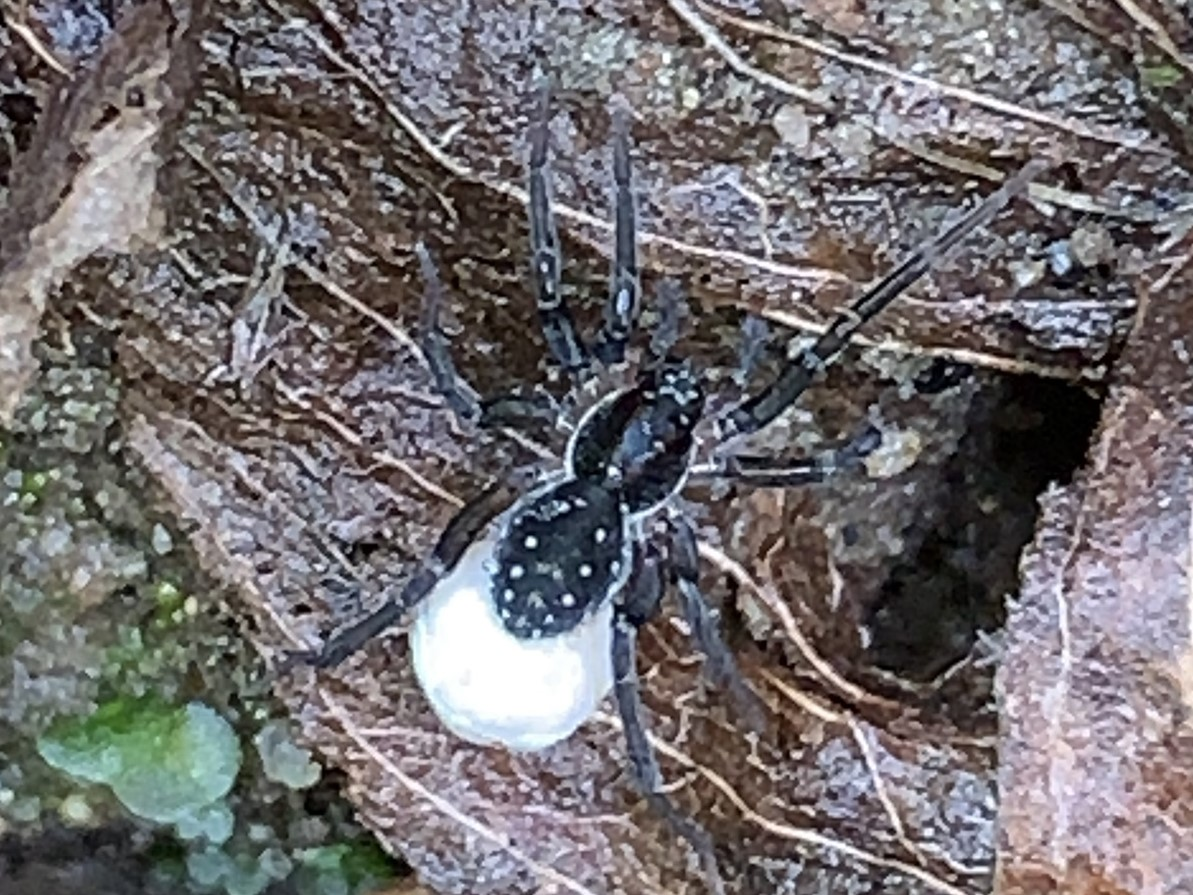
P. montanus

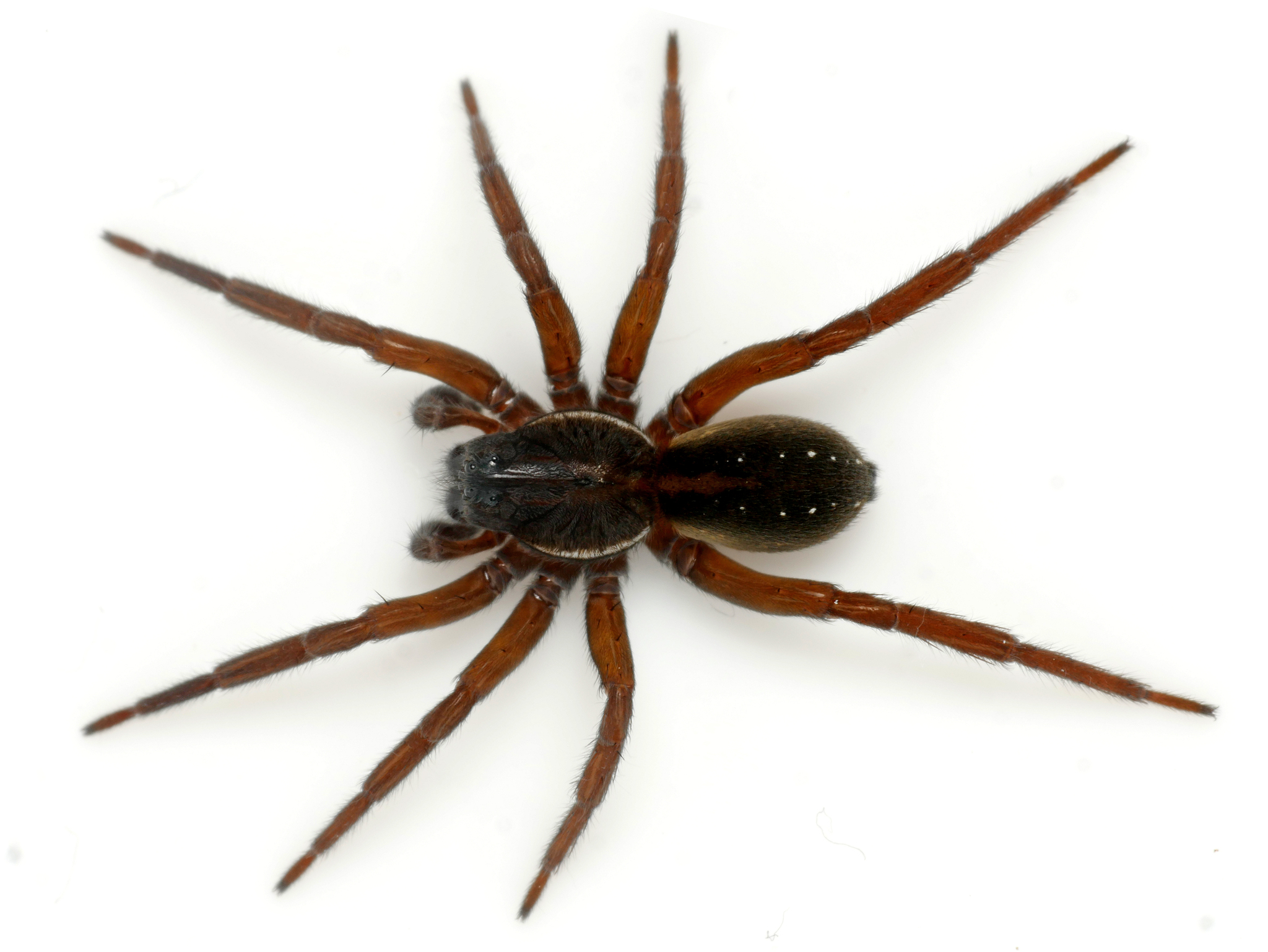
P. piscatorius

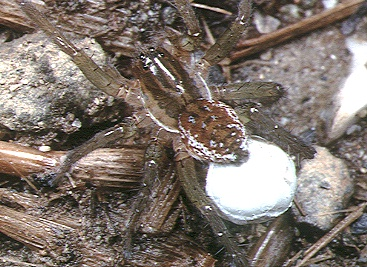
P. subpiraticus

As of October 2025, this genus includes 49 species:

- Pirata affinis Roewer, 1960 – DR Congo
- Pirata africanus (Roewer, 1960) – Namibia
- Pirata alachuus Gertsch & Wallace, 1935 – United States
- Pirata allapahae Gertsch, 1940 – United States
- Pirata apalacheus Gertsch, 1940 – United States
- Pirata aspirans Chamberlin, 1904 – Canada, United States
- Pirata brevipes (Banks, 1893) – DR Congo (region)
- Pirata browni Gertsch & Davis, 1940 – Mexico
- Pirata bryantae Kurata, 1944 – Alaska, Canada
- Pirata chamberlini (Lessert, 1927) – DR Congo, Tanzania
- Pirata coreanus Paik, 1991 – Korea
- Pirata davisi Wallace & Exline, 1978 – United States, Mexico
- Pirata digitatus Tso & Chen, 2004 – Taiwan
- Pirata felix O. Pickard-Cambridge, 1898 – Mexico
- Pirata hiteorum Wallace & Exline, 1978 – United States
- Pirata indigena Wallace & Exline, 1978 – United States
- Pirata iviei Wallace & Exline, 1978 – United States
- Pirata mayaca Gertsch, 1940 – United States, Bahama Islands, Cuba
- Pirata montanoides Banks, 1892 – Canada, United States
- Pirata montanus Emerton, 1885 – Russia (Kurile Is.), Canada, United States
- Pirata nanatus Gertsch, 1940 – United States
- Pirata niokolona Roewer, 1961 – Senegal
- Pirata pagicola Chamberlin, 1925 – Mexico to Panama
- Pirata pallipes (Blackwall, 1857) – Algeria
- Pirata piratellus (Strand, 1907) – Japan
- Pirata piraticus (Clerck, 1757) – North America, Europe, Turkey, Caucasus, Russia (Europe to Far East), Kazakhstan, Iran, Central Asia, China, Japan (type species)
- Pirata piratimorphus (Strand, 1908) – United States
- Pirata piscatorius (Clerck, 1757) – Europe, Russia (Europe to Middle Siberia)
- Pirata praedo Kulczyński, 1885 – Russia (Urals to Far East), Mongolia, China, Japan, Canada, United States
- Pirata proximus O. Pickard-Cambridge, 1876 – Egypt
- Pirata punctipes (Gravely, 1924) – India
- Pirata sagitta (Mello-Leitão, 1941) – Argentina
- Pirata sedentarius Montgomery, 1904 – North America, Greater Antilles
- Pirata seminolus Gertsch & Wallace, 1935 – United States
- Pirata spatulatus Chai, 1985 – China
- Pirata spiniger (Simon, 1898) – United States
- Pirata subannulipes (Strand, 1906) – Ethiopia
- Pirata subpiraticus (Bösenberg & Strand, 1906) – Russia (Far East), Korea, China, Japan, Indonesia (Java), Philippines
- Pirata suwaneus Gertsch, 1940 – United States, Bahama Is.
- Pirata sylvanus Chamberlin & Ivie, 1944 – United States
- Pirata tenuitarsis Simon, 1876 – Europe to Mongolia
- Pirata timidus (Lucas, 1846) – Algeria
- Pirata trepidus Roewer, 1960 – Namibia
- Pirata triens Wallace & Exline, 1978 – United States
- Pirata turrialbicus Wallace & Exline, 1978 – Costa Rica, Panama, Cuba
- Pirata veracruzae Gertsch & Davis, 1940 – Mexico
- Pirata welakae Wallace & Exline, 1978 – United States
- Pirata werneri (Roewer, 1960) – Morocco
- Pirata zavattarii (Caporiacco, 1941) – Ethiopia
