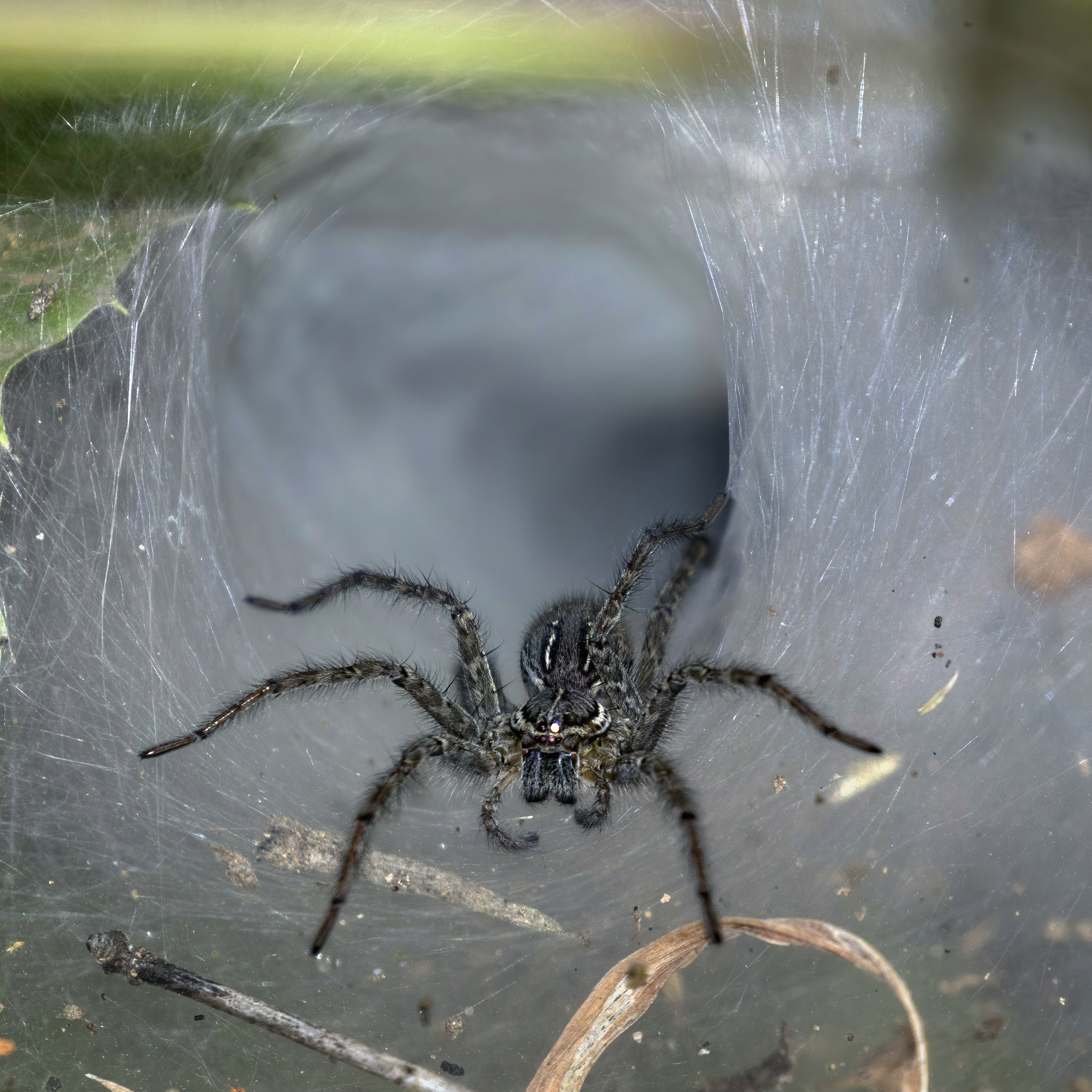
- Hippasa sp. in funnel web
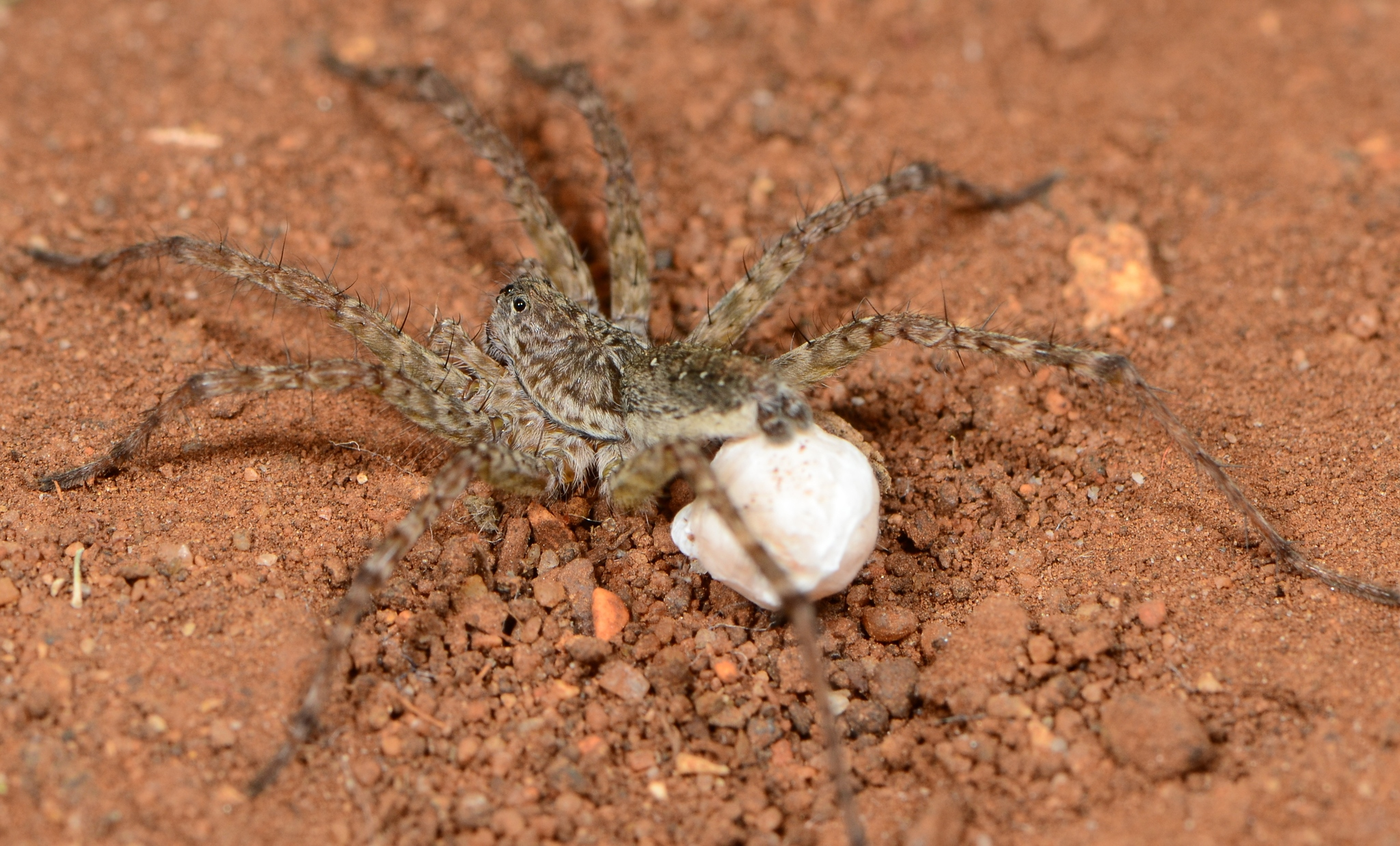
- Female H. australis from South Africa

Scientific classification
- Kingdom: Animalia
- Phylum: Arthropoda
- Subphylum: Chelicerata
- Class: Arachnida
- Order: Araneae
- Infraorder: Araneomorphae
- Family: Lycosidae
- Genus: Hippasa; Simon, 1885

Type species
- Hippasa agelenoides (Simon, 1884)

Species
- See text

= Hippasa =

Genus of spiders

Hippasa is a genus of spiders in the wolf spider family Lycosidae, first described by Eugène Simon in 1885.

== Distribution ==
Hippasa species are distributed across Africa (Egypt to South Africa) and Asia (Pakistan to Japan).

== Life style ==
Hippasa species prefer low, grassy vegetation with open spaces.

They construct an agelenid-like funnel web between low vegetation or between roots at ground level. The web consists of a densely woven sheet with a funnel retreat leading into the ground or dense vegetation. Their webs can be seen early in the morning.

Juveniles can be present in high densities, covering grass with webs.

== Description ==
The genus can be recognized by the two-segmented posterior pair of spinnerets, with the basal segment especially elongated, and by white spots on the abdomen. The body is covered with long setae. The carapace is usually dark with lateral margins and bands, and the fovea has radiating striae. The legs are relatively long and usually banded.

The epigyne is thickly covered with white setae. The sternum is usually pale with a dark median stripe.

== Taxonomy ==
The genus was revised by Alderweireldt and Jocqué in 2005.

== Species ==
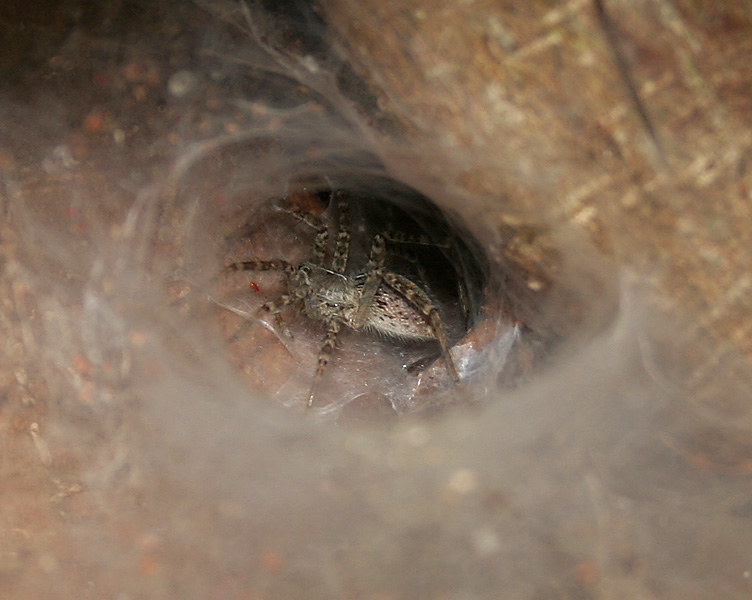
H. agelenoides

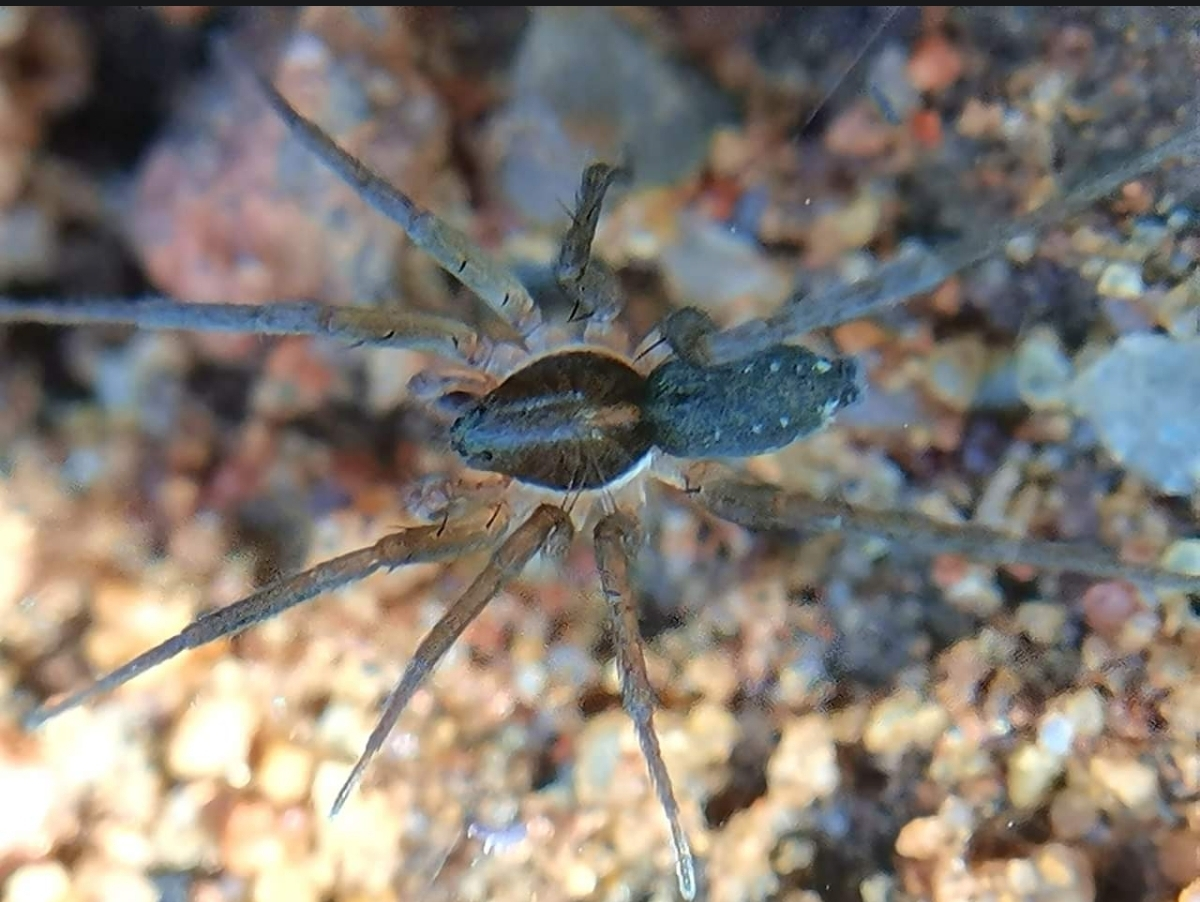
H. elienae

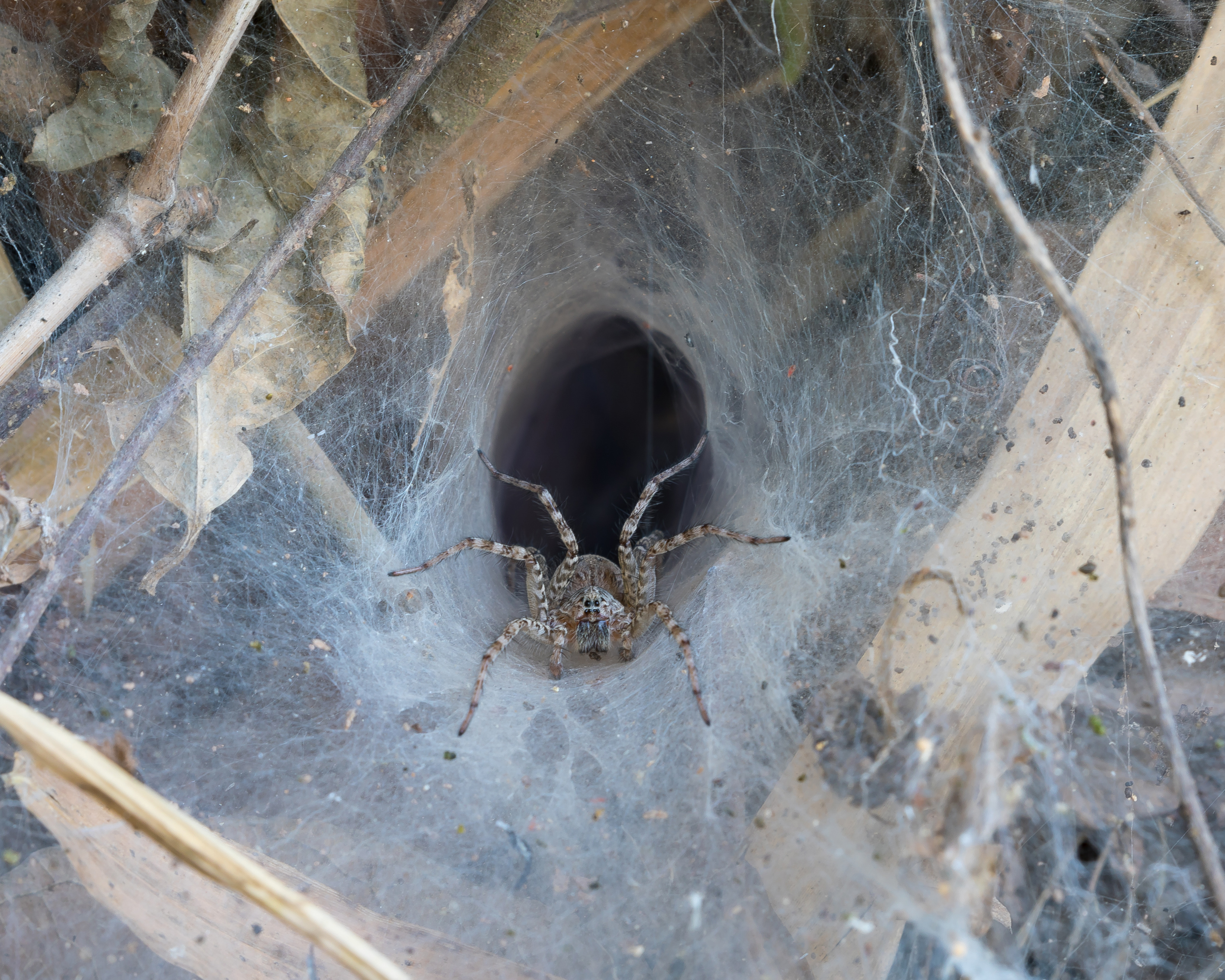
H. holmerae

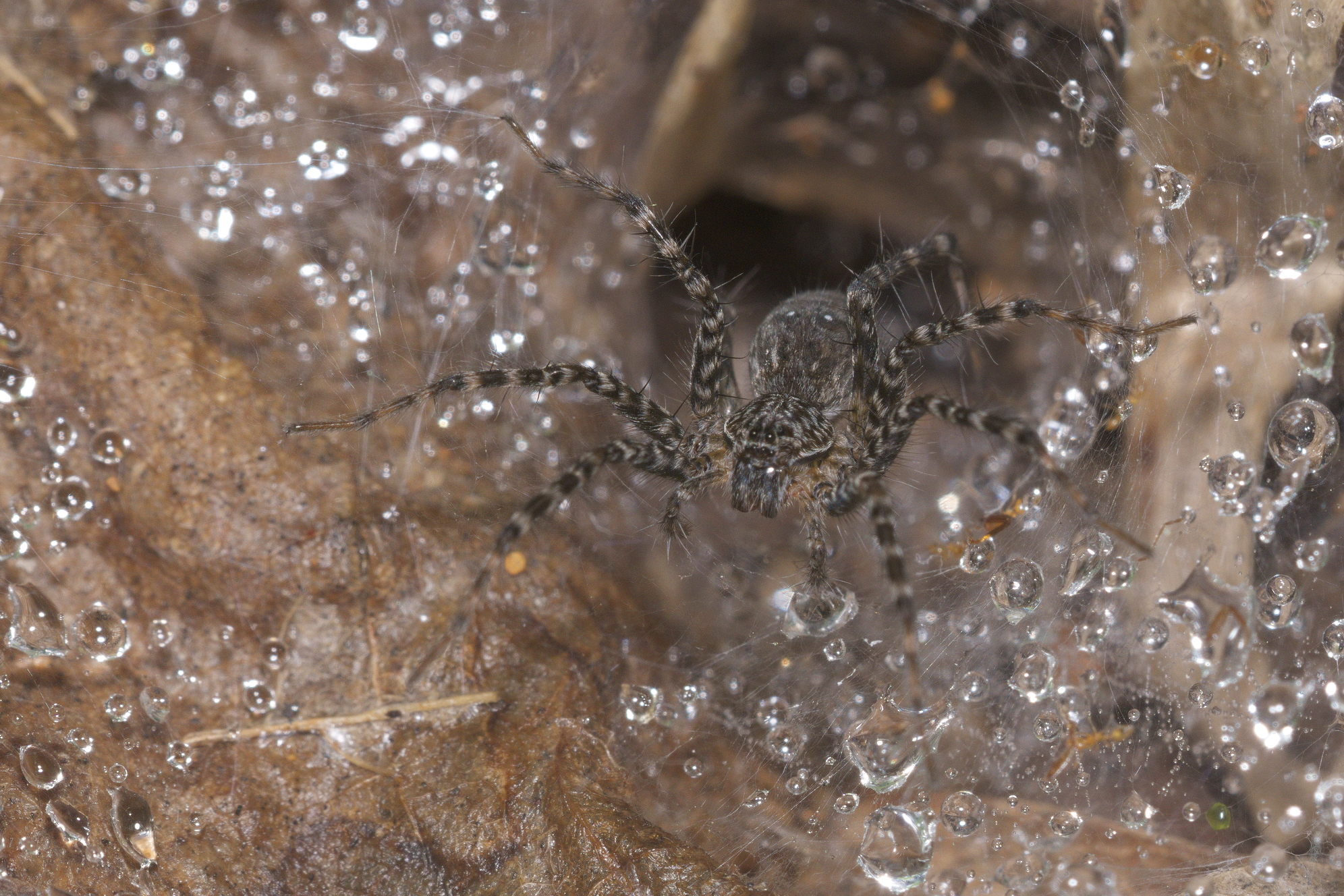
Hippasa sp.

As of January 2026, this genus includes 27 species:

- Hippasa affinis Lessert, 1933 – Angola
- Hippasa agelenoides (Simon, 1884) – Pakistan, India, Myanmar (type species)
- Hippasa albopunctata Thorell, 1899 – Cameroon, Ivory Coast
- Hippasa australis Lawrence, 1927 – Africa
- Hippasa brechti Alderweireldt & Jocqué, 2005 – Ivory Coast, Togo
- Hippasa decemnotata Simon, 1909 – West Africa
- Hippasa deserticola Simon, 1889 – Egypt to Bangladesh (Widespread Central Asia)
- Hippasa elienae Alderweireldt & Jocqué, 2005 – Kenya, Tanzania, South Africa
- Hippasa flavicoma Caporiacco, 1935 – Pakistan
- Hippasa funerea Lessert, 1925 – Botswana, Lesotho, South Africa
- Hippasa himalayensis Gravely, 1924 – India, Pakistan
- Hippasa holmerae Thorell, 1895 – Asia
- Hippasa innesi Simon, 1889 – Egypt
- Hippasa lamtoensis Dresco, 1981 – Ivory Coast
- Hippasa lingxianensis Yin & Wang, 1980 – China, Japan
- Hippasa loundesi Gravely, 1924 – India
- Hippasa lycosina Pocock, 1900 – China, Laos, India
- Hippasa madraspatana Gravely, 1924 – India
- Hippasa marginata Roewer, 1960 – Cameroon
- Hippasa modog Wang, Li, Marusik & Zhang, 2026 – China
- Hippasa olivacea (Thorell, 1887) – Myanmar, India
- Hippasa pantherina Pocock, 1899 – Southern Asia
- Hippasa partita (O. Pickard-Cambridge, 1876) – Africa
- Hippasa pulmoniformis Wang, Li, Marusik & Zhang, 2026 – China, Vietnam
- Hippasa simoni (Thorell, 1887) – Myanmar
- Hippasa thailandica Wang, Li, Marusik & Zhang, 2026 – Thailand
- Hippasa valiveruensis Patel & Reddy, 1993 – India
