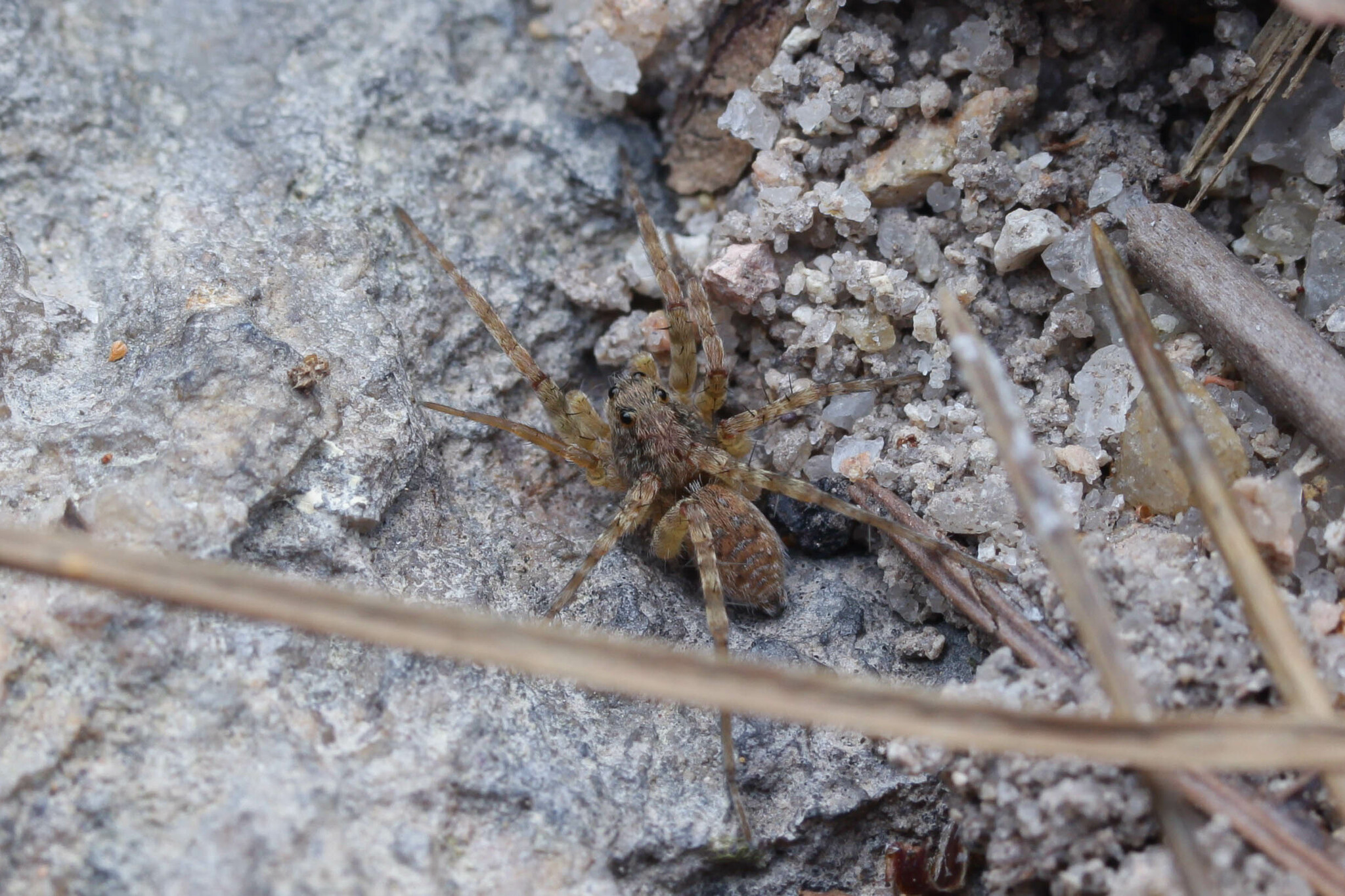
- Female from China
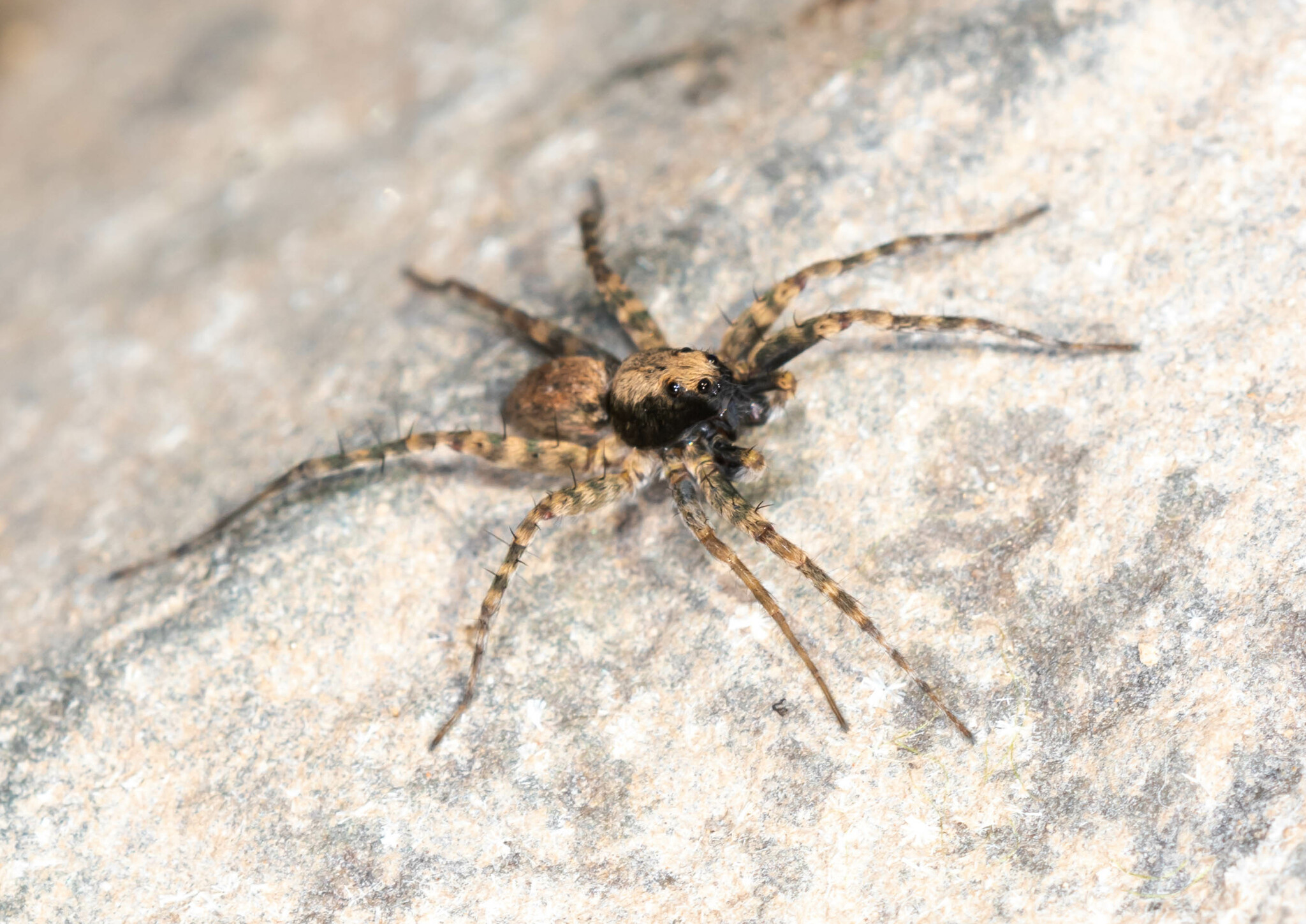
- Male from Thailand

Scientific classification
- Kingdom: Animalia
- Phylum: Arthropoda
- Subphylum: Chelicerata
- Class: Arachnida
- Order: Araneae
- Infraorder: Araneomorphae
- Family: Lycosidae
- Genus: Wadicosa
- Species: W. fidelis

Binomial name
- Wadicosa fidelis (O. Pickard-Cambridge, 1872)

Synonyms
- Lycosa fidelis O. Pickard-Cambridge, 1872; Lycosa galerita L. Koch, 1875; Lycosa ipnochoera Thorell, 1890; Lycosa birmanica Thorell, 1895; Pardosa spilota Pocock, 1903; Lycosa indistincte-picta Strand, 1907; Pardosa armillata Schenkel, 1936; Pardosa kraepelini Roewer, 1959; Pardosa bhatnagari Sadana, 1971; Evippa mandlaensis Gajbe, 2004

= Wadicosa fidelis =

Species of spider

Wadicosa fidelis is a species of wolf spider in the family Lycosidae. It has a very wide distribution across the Old World, ranging from Macaronesia and North Africa through Southern Europe, Turkey, the Caucasus, and the Middle East to Central Asia, China, Japan, Pakistan, India, Bhutan, Bangladesh, the Philippines, and Indonesia.

== Taxonomy ==
The species was originally described as Lycosa fidelis by Octavius Pickard-Cambridge in 1872 from a male specimen collected in Palestine. It was later transferred to the genus Wadicosa by Jörg Wunderlich in 1992. Kronestedt and Zyuzin designated it as the type species for the genus Wadicosa in 2009.

The species has a complex taxonomic history with numerous synonyms, reflecting its wide distribution and variable appearance. Many formerly recognized species, including Pardosa armillata, P. kraepelini, P. spilota, and Evippa mandlaensis, have been synonymized with W. fidelis based on morphological studies.

== Distribution ==
W. fidelis has been recorded from Macaronesia, North Africa, Southern Europe, Turkey, the Caucasus, the Middle East, Central Asia, China, Japan, Pakistan, India, Bhutan, Bangladesh, the Philippines, and Indonesia (Sumatra).

== Description ==
Wadicosa fidelis is a medium-sized wolf spider showing clear sexual dimorphism. Females are noticeably larger and more robust than males, with a total length of around 7.2 mm compared to 6.3–6.5 mm in males. Females also appear more densely covered with whitish hairs, giving them a somewhat fuzzy appearance, while males have less prominent pubescence.

Both sexes have a blackish brown carapace with a yellowish to dark greyish brown median field that has jagged edges. Lateral bands are typically absent or present only as indistinct lighter spots. The abdomen displays a pattern of yellowish spots and bars on a blackish background, with a greyish yellow to blackish lanceolate stripe and a series of 3–4 transverse yellowish bars posterior to it. In females, these yellowish patches are more distinct and each contains a dark dot with a long dark hair. The legs are yellowish brown with dark annulation.

Males can be distinguished by the distinctive structure of their pedipalps, particularly the tegular apophysis which has an upper branch directed retrolaterad and a composite lower branch with numerous minute spinulae and verruciform outgrowths. The embolus is long with a rounded, non-sclerotized widening before the tip.

Females are characterized by their epigyne structure, which features an epigynal cavity that is wider than long and posteriorly open. The spermathecae are comparatively large, somewhat spherical, and situated close to the midline. The central part of the epigynal cavity contains an elevated, triangular septum that tapers backwards.

== Etymology ==
The specific epithet fidelis is Latin meaning "faithful" or "loyal".
