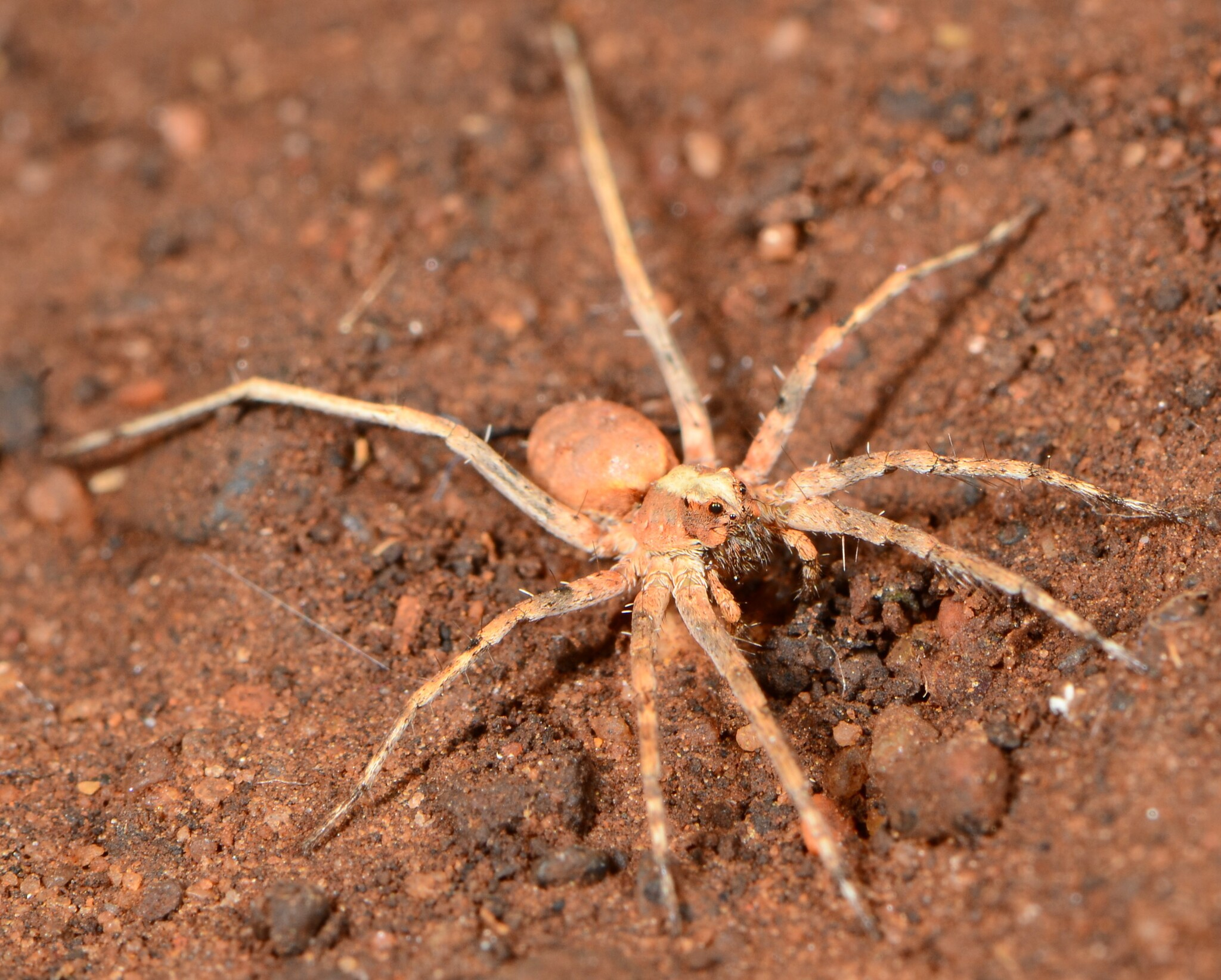
- E. squamulatum from South Africa
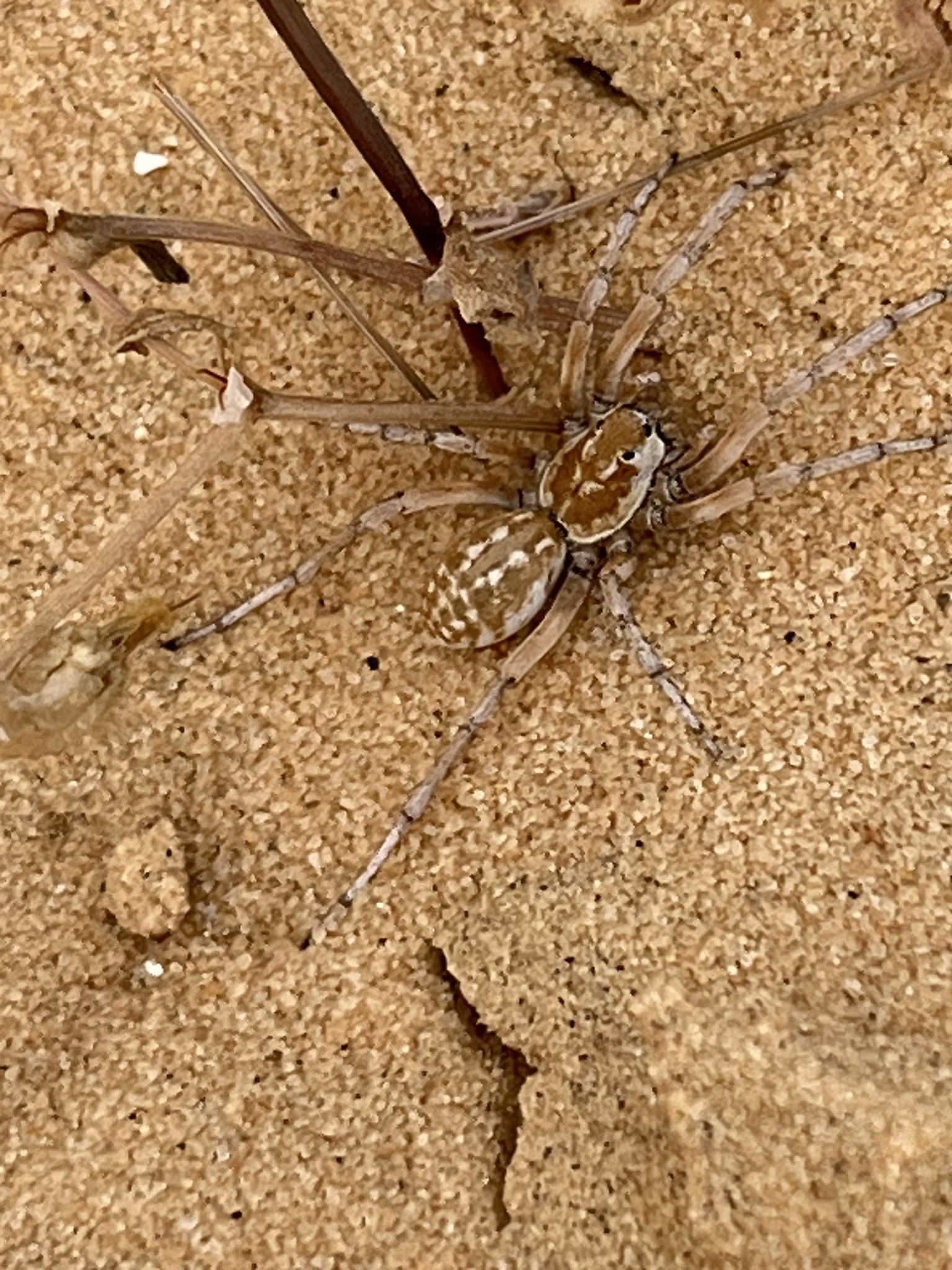
- E. simoni from Israel

Scientific classification
- Kingdom: Animalia
- Phylum: Arthropoda
- Subphylum: Chelicerata
- Class: Arachnida
- Order: Araneae
- Infraorder: Araneomorphae
- Family: Lycosidae
- Genus: Evippomma; Roewer

Species
- 6, see text

= Evippomma =

Genus of spiders

Evippomma is a genus of mainly African spiders in the family Lycosidae with six described species. It was first described in 1959 by Roewer.

== Distribution ==
Species of this genus are mainly found in Africa, with one species described from Pakistan, and one reaching into Israel.

== Life style ==
Spiders in this genus are free-running ground dwellers.

== Description ==
Evippomma are small to medium-sized wolf spiders.

The carapace is blackish brown with a wide dentate yellowish-brown marginal band that disappears anteriorly near the first leg, and a dark brown median thoracic band that is constricted behind the fovea and then widens. The body is densely covered with distinctive flat, leaf-shaped hairs.

The carapace usually appears dark brown, with the median band well developed in most species but absent in some. Lateral bands are always clear and in some species are broken into several pale spots. The median and lateral carapace bands are often covered with whitish to orange hairs. The carapace has a typical transverse depression behind the ocular area similar to Evippa.

The ocular area bears several long spines. The anterior row of eyes is procurved, with anterior lateral eyes somewhat smaller than the anterior median eyes. The width of the anterior row is less than the distance between the outer edges of the large posterior median eyes.

The abdomen above is covered with mixed yellow-white and brown hairs, featuring two yellow patches at the anterior apex followed on each side by a row of about four smaller spots. The sides have some stripes and patches of ash gray hairs.

The legs are characterized by the presence of four or five pairs of ventral spines on tibia I (apart from an additional smaller apical pair). The legs of some species have a very striking fringe of black hairs on the ventral and dorsal side of tibia I, a character visible even in the field. The legs are relatively shorter in Evippomma compared to Evippa.

== Taxonomy ==
The genus Evippomma was revised by Alderweireldt in 1992.

== Species ==
As of September 2025, this genus includes six species:

- Evippomma albomarginatum Alderweireldt, 1992 – Ethiopia, Burkina Faso, Senegal
- Evippomma evippinum (Simon, 1897) – Pakistan
- Evippomma plumipes (Lessert, 1936) – Mozambique, Tanzania, South Africa, Zimbabwe
- Evippomma rechenbergi Bayer, Foelix & Alderweireldt, 2017 – Morocco
- Evippomma simoni Alderweireldt, 1992 – Egypt, Sudan, Israel
- Evippomma squamulatum (Simon, 1898) – Southern Africa (type species)
