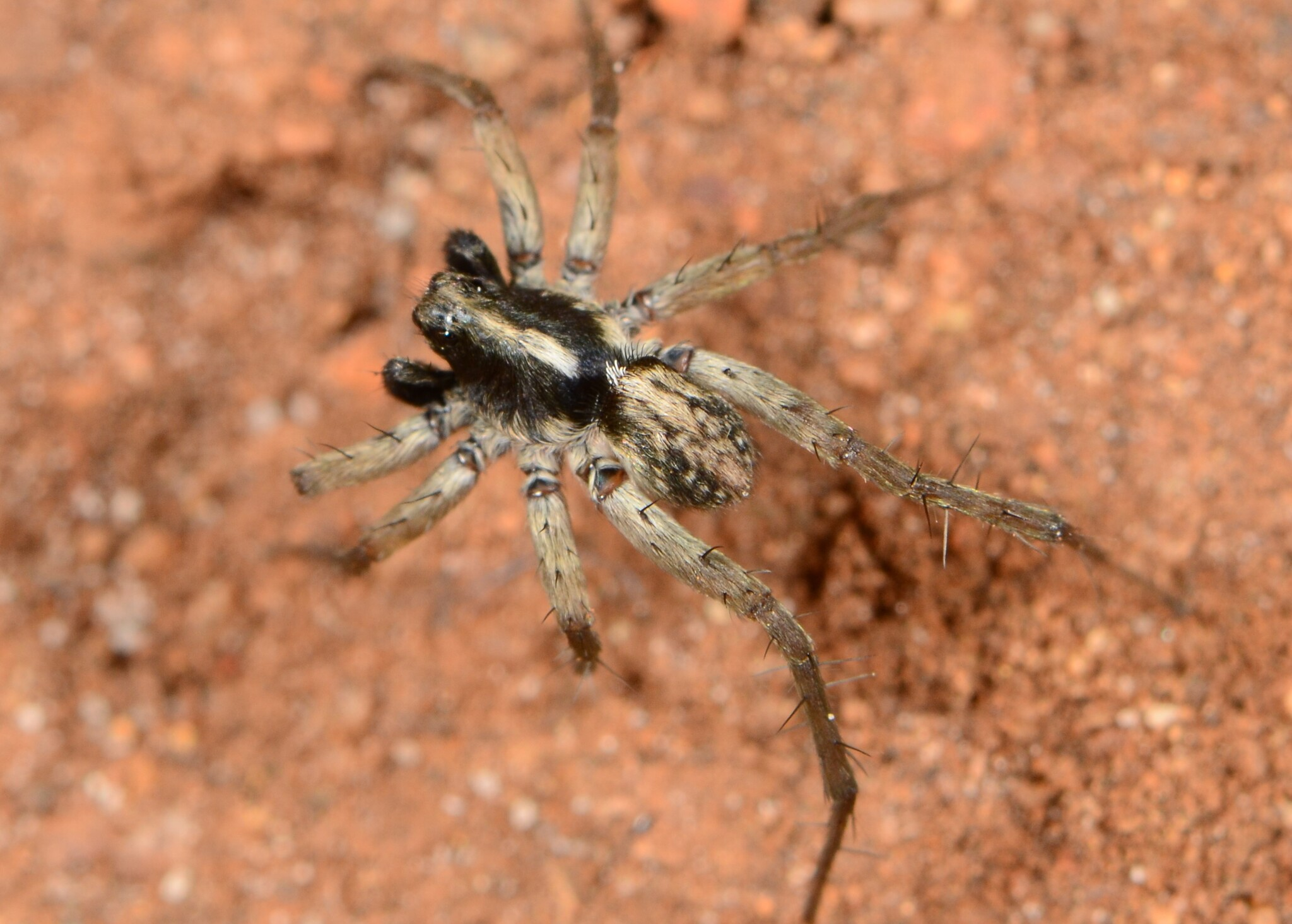
- Male
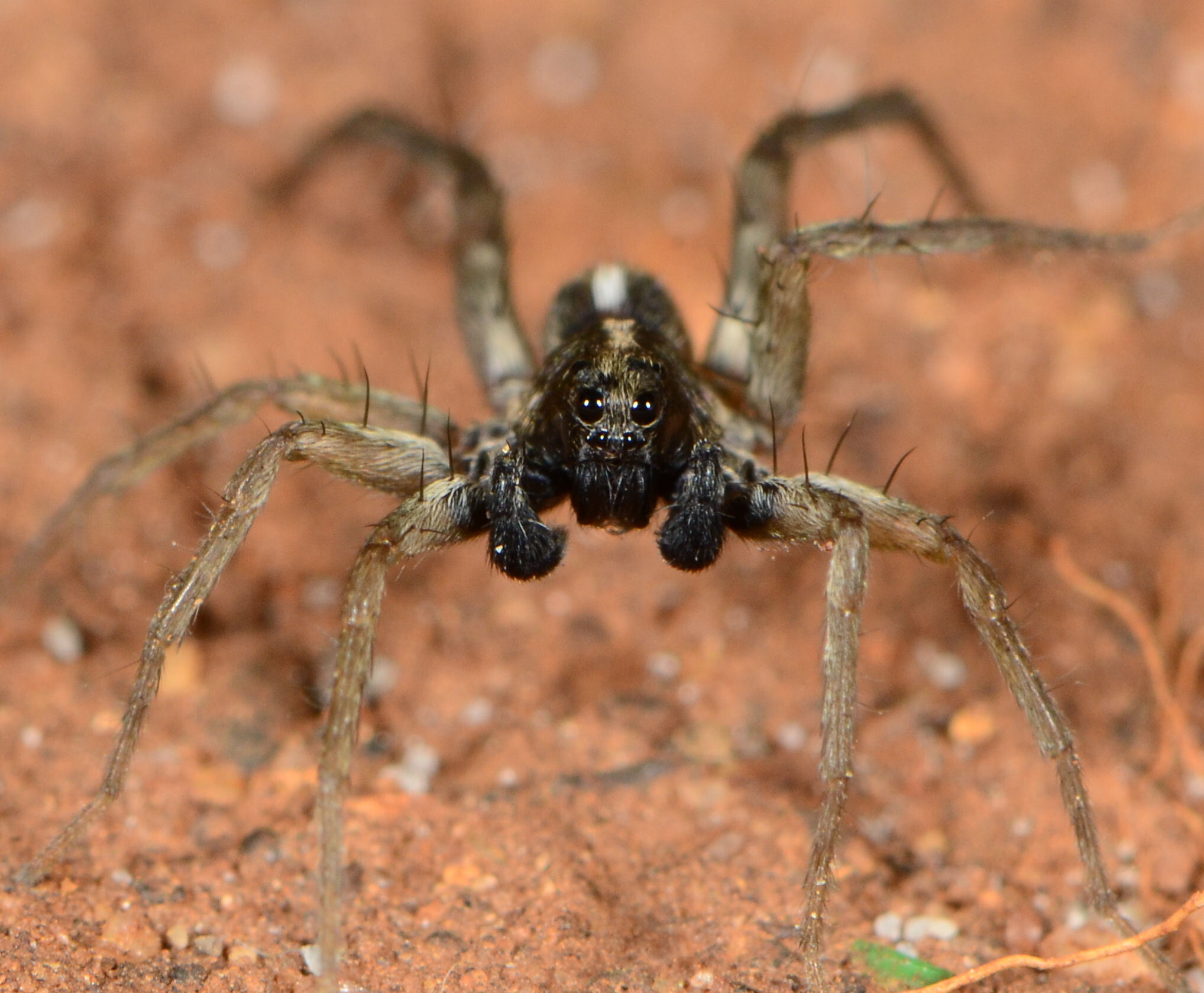
- Male

Scientific classification
- Kingdom: Animalia
- Phylum: Arthropoda
- Subphylum: Chelicerata
- Class: Arachnida
- Order: Araneae
- Infraorder: Araneomorphae
- Family: Lycosidae
- Genus: Wadicosa
- Species: W. oncka

Binomial name
- Wadicosa oncka (Lawrence, 1927)

Synonyms
- Pardosa resoluta Roewer, 1959; Pardosa kisokwea Roewer, 1959; Pardosa wittei Roewer, 1959; Pardosa irrasa Roewer, 1959; Pardosa versuta Roewer, 1959

= Wadicosa oncka =

Oncka's Pardosa wolf spider

Species of spider

Wadicosa oncka is a species of spider in the family Lycosidae. It is found throughout Africa and is commonly known as Oncka's Pardosa wolf spider.

== Distribution ==
Wadicosa oncka is found widely throughout Africa.

In South Africa, it is recorded from Lesotho and six provinces at altitudes ranging from 7 to 2066 m. Localities include Dwesa Nature Reserve in the Eastern Cape, several sites in Gauteng including Pretoria and Roodeplaatdam Nature Reserve, Margate and Kosi Bay in KwaZulu-Natal, Levubu and Tshipise in Limpopo, Barberton and Sabie in Mpumalanga, and Swartberg Nature Reserve in the Western Cape.

== Habitat and ecology ==
Wadicosa oncka is a free-living ground dweller sampled from the Grassland, Fynbos, Indian Ocean Coastal Belt, Savanna, and Thicket biomes. It has also been sampled from lychee orchards and strawberry fields.

== Description ==
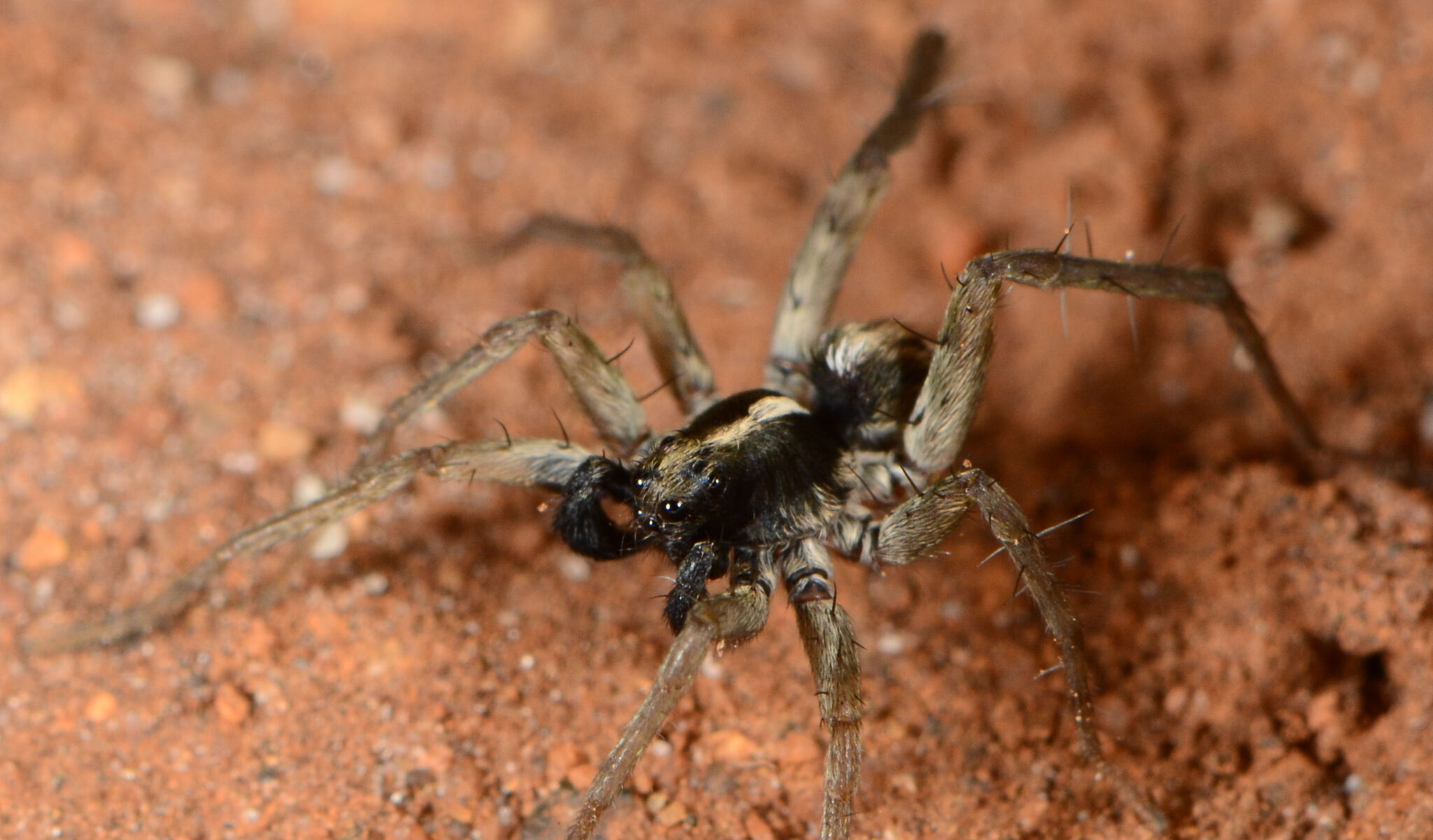
male

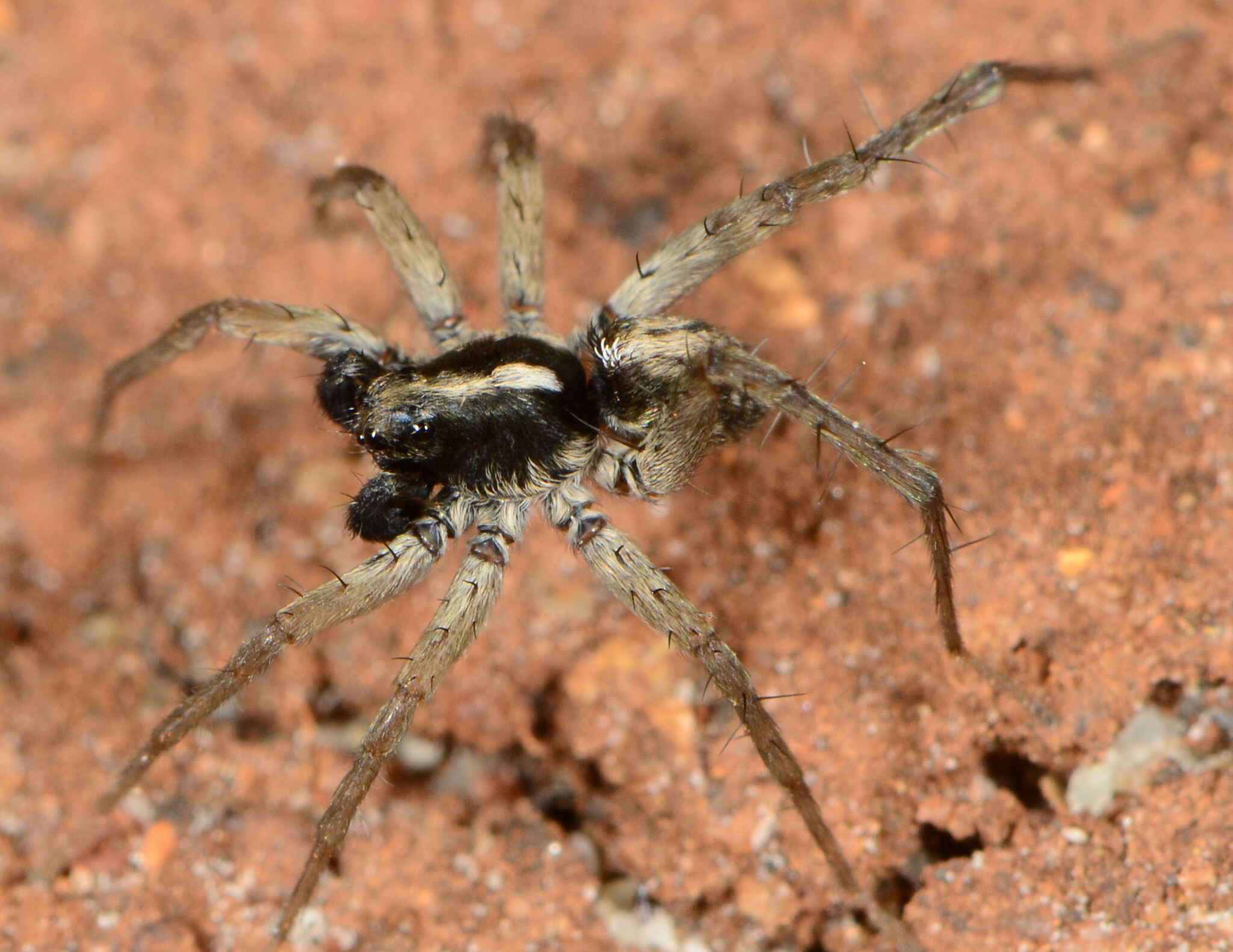
male

== Conservation ==
Wadicosa oncka is listed as Least Concern by the South African National Biodiversity Institute due to its wide geographical range. It is protected in Dwesa Nature Reserve, Roodeplaatdam Nature Reserve, and Swartberg Nature Reserve.

== Taxonomy ==
Wadicosa oncka was originally described by Lawrence in 1927 as Pardosa oncka from Namibia. The species was revised by Kronestedt (2015), who transferred it to the genus Wadicosa, and is known from both sexes. Several species described by Roewer (1959) have been synonymized with this species.
