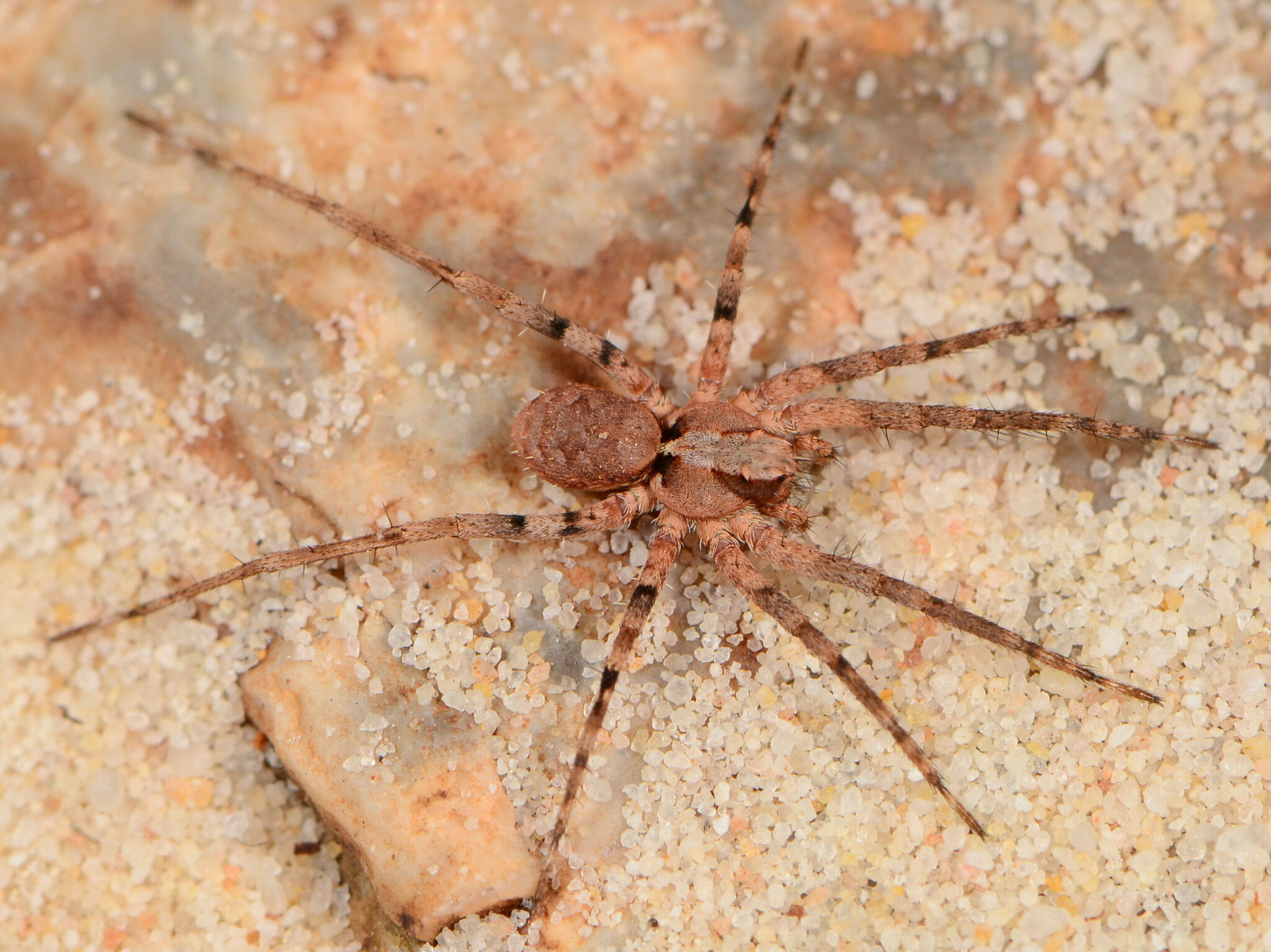
- female from South Africa
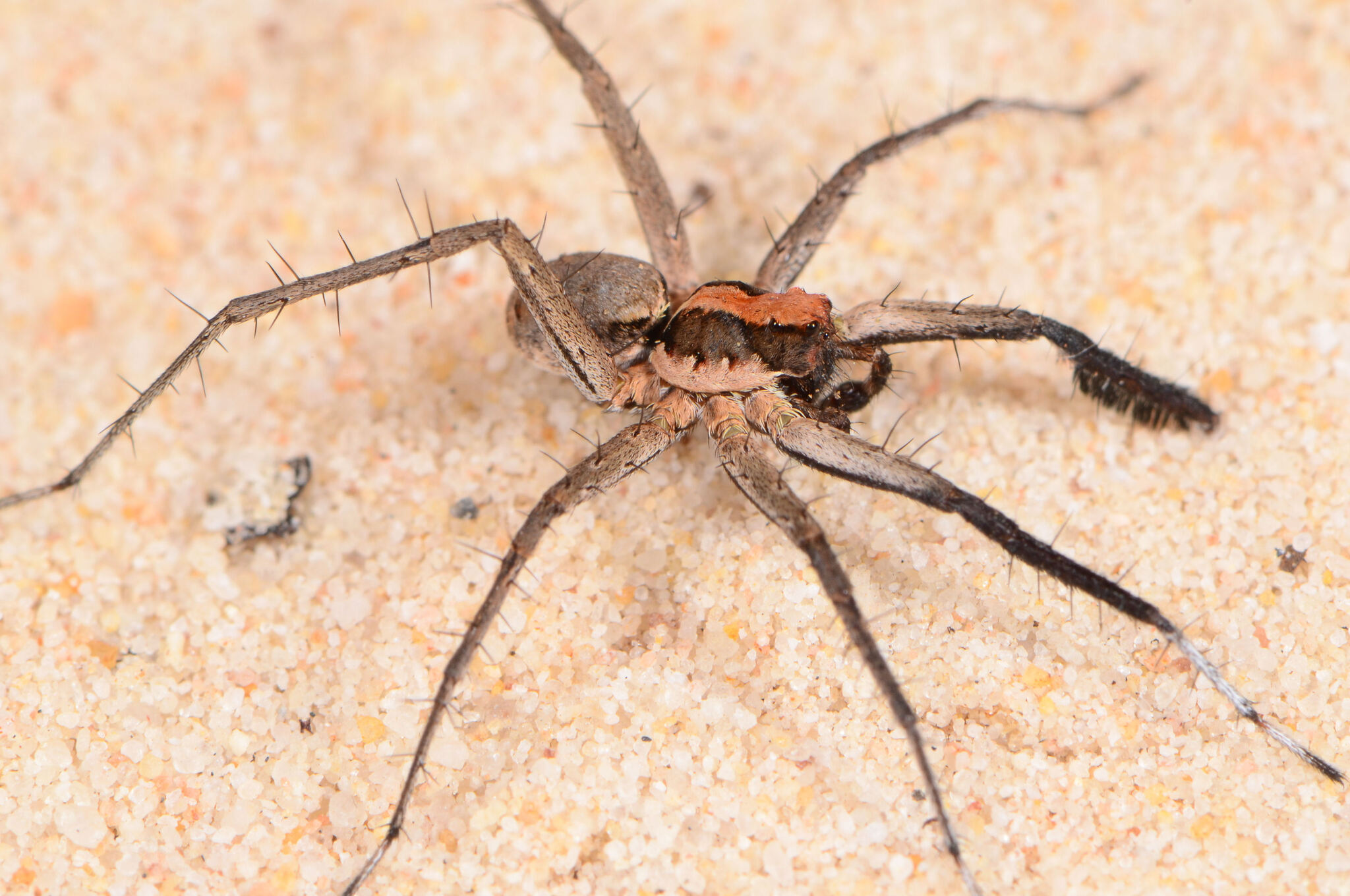
- male from South Africa

Scientific classification
- Kingdom: Animalia
- Phylum: Arthropoda
- Subphylum: Chelicerata
- Class: Arachnida
- Order: Araneae
- Infraorder: Araneomorphae
- Family: Lycosidae
- Genus: Evippomma
- Species: E. squamulatum

Binomial name
- Evippomma squamulatum (Simon, 1898)

Synonyms
- Evippa squamulata Simon, 1898; Evippa cristata Simon, 1910; Evippa relicta Lawrence, 1927; Proevippa ovambica Lawrence, 1927; Evippa differta Lawrence, 1952; Evippomma cristata Roewer, 1955; Evippomma cristatum Roewer, 1959

= Evippomma squamulatum =

Bushy Leg Evippomma Wolf Spider

Species of spider

Evippomma squamulatum is a species of spider in the family Lycosidae. It occurs in southern African countries and is commonly known as the bushy leg Evippomma wolf spider.

== Distribution ==
Evippomma squamulatum has been recorded from Namibia, Botswana, Zimbabwe, and South Africa. In South Africa, the species has a wide distribution across all nine provinces at elevations ranging from 15 to 1816 m.

== Habitat ==
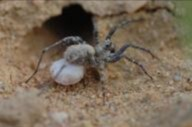
female with egg sac

The species is a free-running ground dweller sampled from a very wide range of biomes, including all floral biomes except the Indian Ocean Coastal Belt and Desert biomes.

It has also been sampled from pistachio orchards.

== Description ==
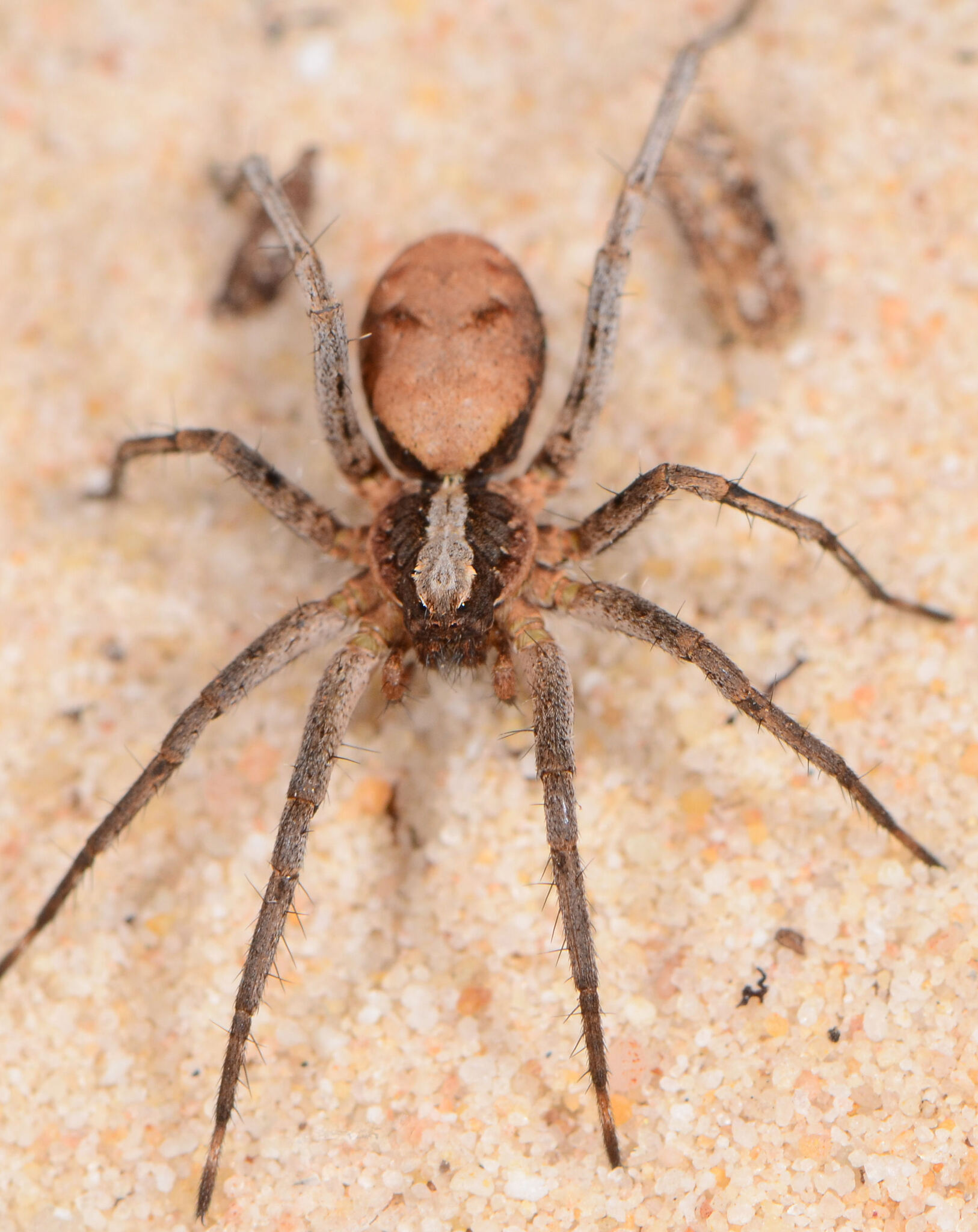
female

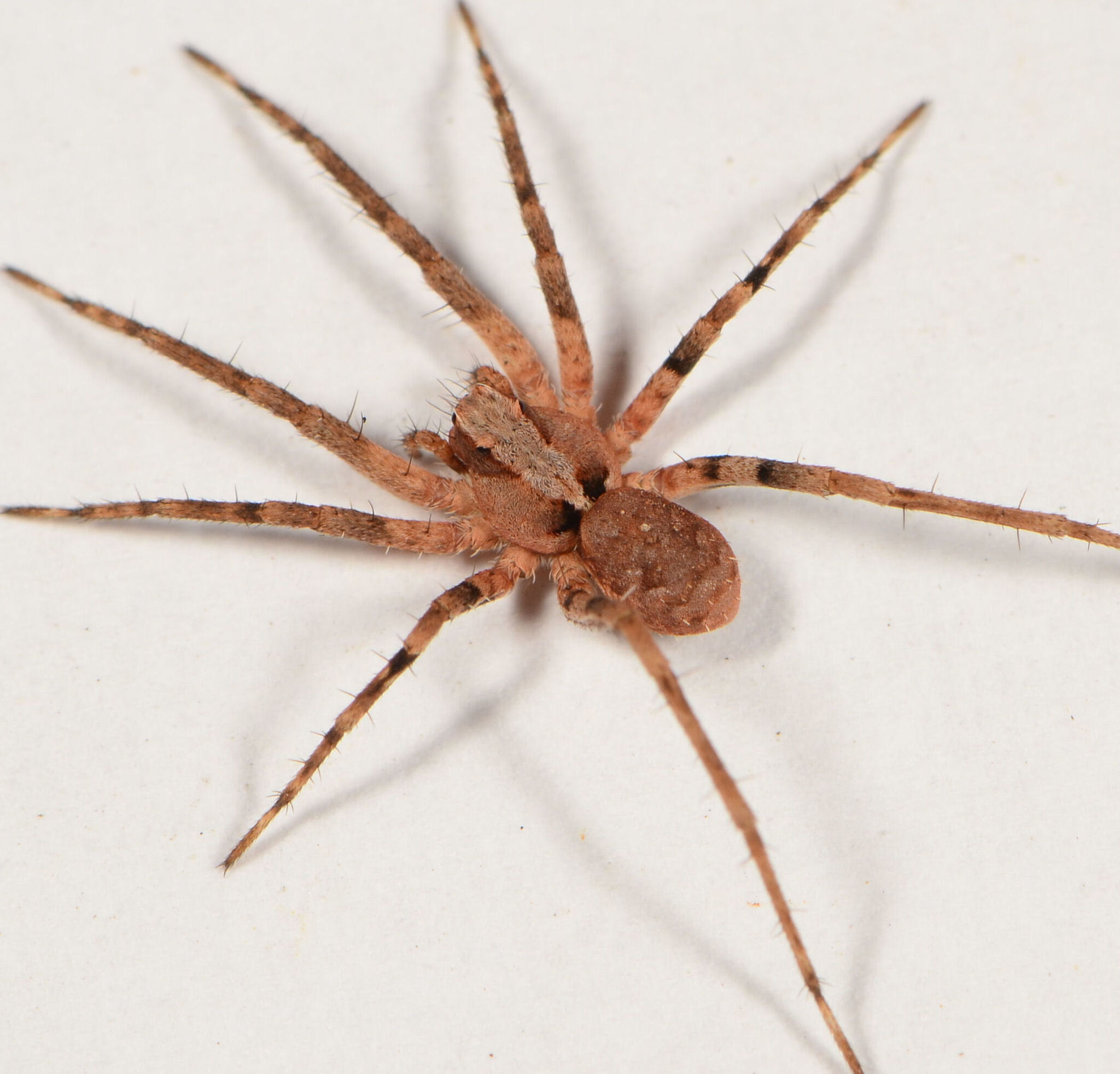
female

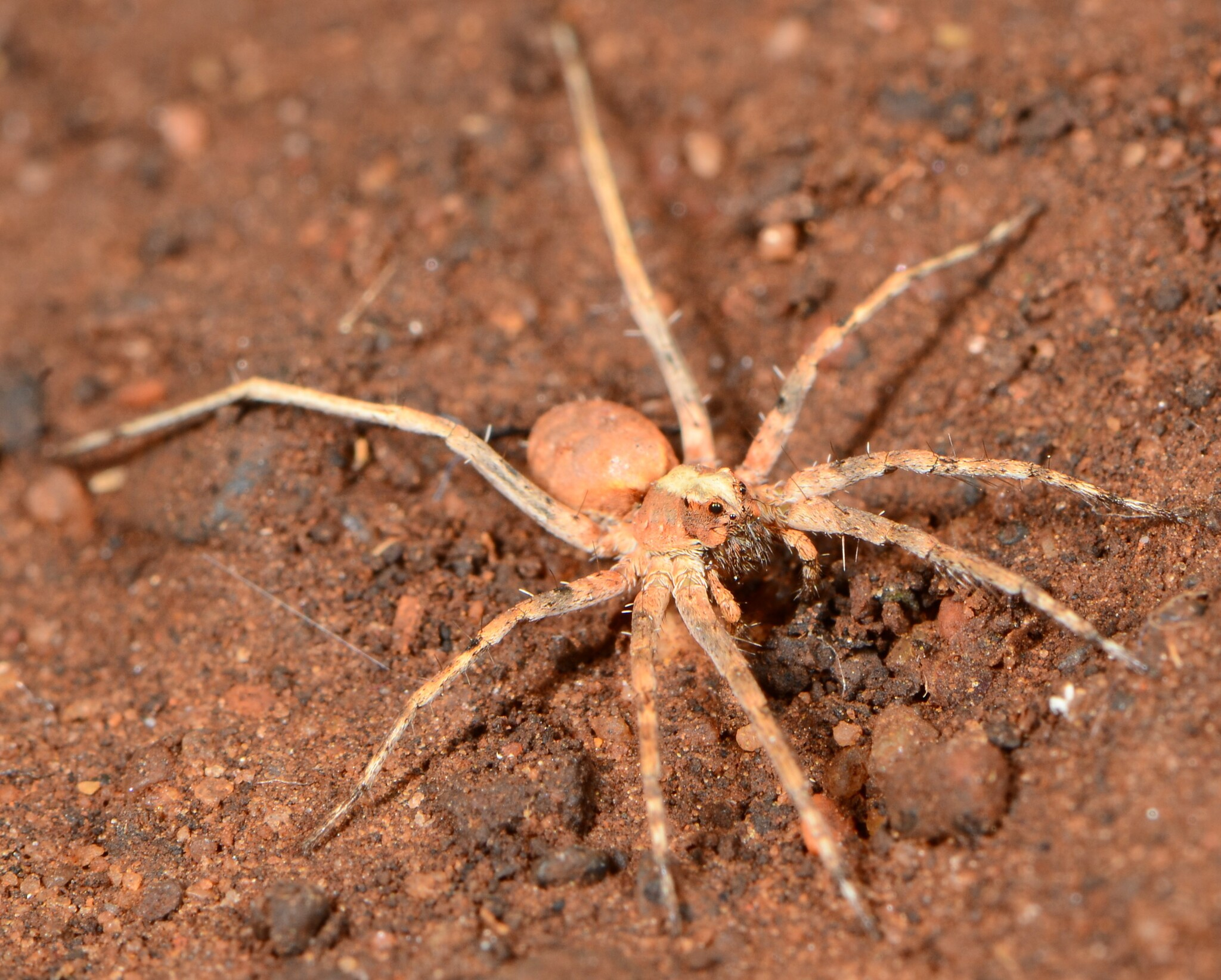
female

== Conservation ==
Evippomma squamulatum is listed as Least Concern by the South African National Biodiversity Institute due to its wide geographical range. The species is protected in more than ten protected areas.

== Taxonomy ==
The species was originally described by Eugène Simon in 1898 as Evippa squamulata from Weenen, South Africa.
