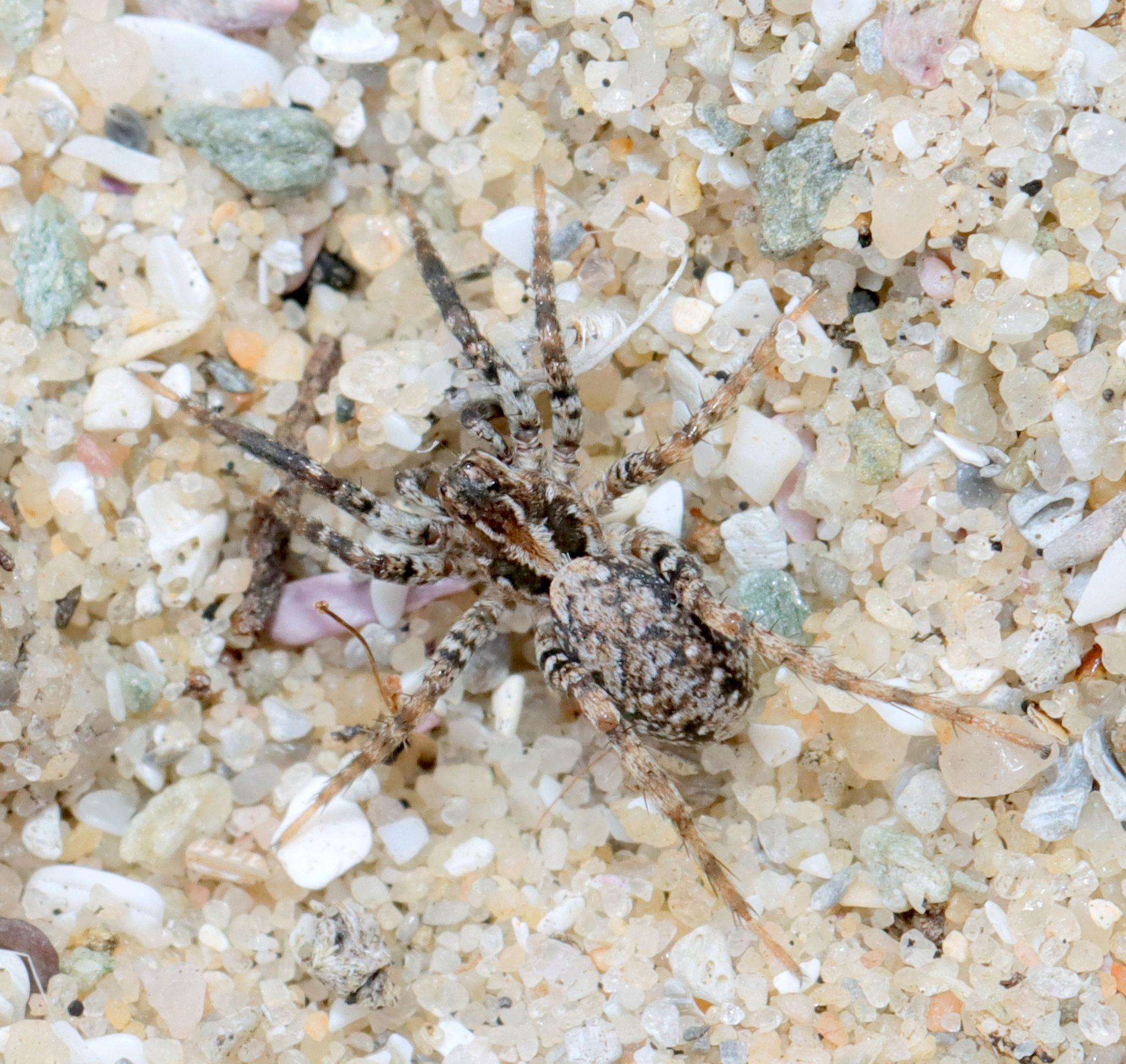

Scientific classification
- Kingdom: Animalia
- Phylum: Arthropoda
- Subphylum: Chelicerata
- Class: Arachnida
- Order: Araneae
- Infraorder: Araneomorphae
- Family: Lycosidae
- Genus: Wadicosa
- Species: W. manubriata

Binomial name
- Wadicosa manubriata (Simon, 1898)

Synonyms
- Pardosa manubriata Simon, 1898

= Wadicosa manubriata =

Star Bust Pardosa Wolf Spider

Species of spider

Wadicosa manubriata is a species of spider in the family Lycosidae. It is found in southern Africa and is commonly known as the star bust Pardosa wolf spider.

== Distribution ==
Wadicosa manubriata is found in Democratic Republic of the Congo, Angola, Zambia, Namibia, Zimbabwe, Mozambique, and South Africa. In South Africa, it is recorded from all provinces at altitudes ranging from 15 to 1722 m.

== Habitat and ecology ==
Wadicosa manubriata inhabits the Fynbos, Grassland, Savanna, Succulent Karoo, and Thicket biomes. The species is a fast running ground spider found in a variety of habitats.

== Conservation ==
Wadicosa manubriata is listed as Least Concern by the South African National Biodiversity Institute. There are no significant threats to the species and due to its wide distribution range, it is therefore listed as Least Concern. The species has been sampled from eight protected areas.

== Taxonomy ==
Wadicosa manubriata was originally described by Eugène Simon in 1898 as Pardosa manubriata from the Cape of Good Hope. The species was revised by Roewer in 1959 and is known from both sexes. In 2023, Kronestedt transferred the species to the genus Wadicosa.
