= Evippa baltoroi =

Scientific classification
- Kingdom: Animalia
- Phylum: Arthropoda
- Subphylum: Chelicerata
- Class: Arachnida
- Order: Araneae
- Infraorder: Araneomorphae
- Family: Lycosidae
- Genus: Evippa
- Species: E. baltoroi

Binomial name
- Evippa baltoroi (Caporiacco, 1935)

Synonyms
- Pardosa baltoroi Caporiacco, 1935; Acantholycosa baltoroi (Caporiacco, 1935)

Species of spider

Evippa baltoroi is a species of wolf spider. It is found in India (Kashmir), Nepal, and western China (Tibet, Sichuan).

This is a dark coloured spider about 7 millimetres (0.28 in) in length. There is a reddish-brown heart-shaped mark on the abdomen and pale rings on the femora.
