= Wadicosa quadrifera =

Scientific classification
- Kingdom: Animalia
- Phylum: Arthropoda
- Subphylum: Chelicerata
- Class: Arachnida
- Order: Araneae
- Infraorder: Araneomorphae
- Family: Lycosidae
- Genus: Wadicosa
- Species: W. quadrifera

Binomial name
- Wadicosa quadrifera (Gravely, 1924)

Species of spider

Wadicosa quadrifera, is a species of spider of the genus Wadicosa. It is native to India and Sri Lanka.
