= Wadicosa enucleata =

Pardosa Wolf Spider

Scientific classification
- Kingdom: Animalia
- Phylum: Arthropoda
- Subphylum: Chelicerata
- Class: Arachnida
- Order: Araneae
- Infraorder: Araneomorphae
- Family: Lycosidae
- Genus: Wadicosa
- Species: W. enucleata

Binomial name
- Wadicosa enucleata (Roewer, 1959)

Synonyms
- Pardosa enucleata Roewer, 1959

Species of spider

Wadicosa enucleata is a species of spider in the family Lycosidae. It is found in Africa and is commonly known as the Pardosa wolf spider.

== Distribution ==
Wadicosa enucleata is found in Ivory Coast, Togo, Nigeria, Central Africa, Kenya, Tanzania, Zambia, Malawi, Botswana, Zimbabwe, Mozambique, and South Africa. In South Africa, the species is known from Mpumalanga and Limpopo, with the type locality given only as "Ost-Transvaal" (Eastern Transvaal).

== Habitat and ecology ==
Wadicosa enucleata is a fast running ground spider.

== Conservation ==
Wadicosa enucleata is listed as Data Deficient for Taxonomic reasons by the South African National Biodiversity Institute. The status of the species remains obscure and additional sampling is needed to collect the male and to determine the species' range.

== Taxonomy ==
Wadicosa enucleata was originally described by Roewer in 1959 as Pardosa enucleata. The species was revised by Roewer in 1959 and is known only from the female. In 2023, Kronestedt transferred the species to the genus Wadicosa.
