= Evippomma plumipes =

White Leg Evippomma Wolf Spider

Scientific classification
- Kingdom: Animalia
- Phylum: Arthropoda
- Subphylum: Chelicerata
- Class: Arachnida
- Order: Araneae
- Infraorder: Araneomorphae
- Family: Lycosidae
- Genus: Evippomma
- Species: E. plumipes

Binomial name
- Evippomma plumipes (Lessert, 1936)

Synonyms
- Pseudevippa plumipes Lessert, 1936; Pseudevippa gulosa Lawrence, 1952

Species of spider

Evippomma plumipes is a species of spider in the family Lycosidae. It occurs in East Africa and southern African countries and is commonly known as the white leg Evippomma wolf spider.

== Distribution ==
Evippomma plumipes has been recorded from East Africa, Tanzania, Zimbabwe, Mozambique, and South Africa.

In South Africa, the species has been recorded from three provinces at elevations ranging from 17 to 1502 m.

== Habitat ==
The species is a free-running ground dweller sampled from the Grassland and Savanna biomes.

== Conservation ==
Evippomma plumipes is listed as Least Concern by the South African National Biodiversity Institute due to its wide geographical range. It is protected in Kalkfontein Dam Nature Reserve and Ndumo Game Reserve.

== Taxonomy ==
Evippomma plumipes was originally described by Roger de Lessert in 1936 as Pseudevippa plumipes from Mozambique.
