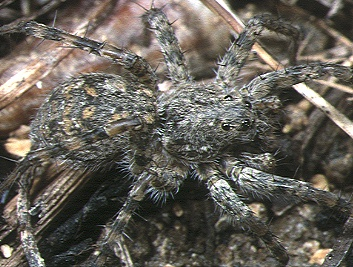
- W. okinawensis, female
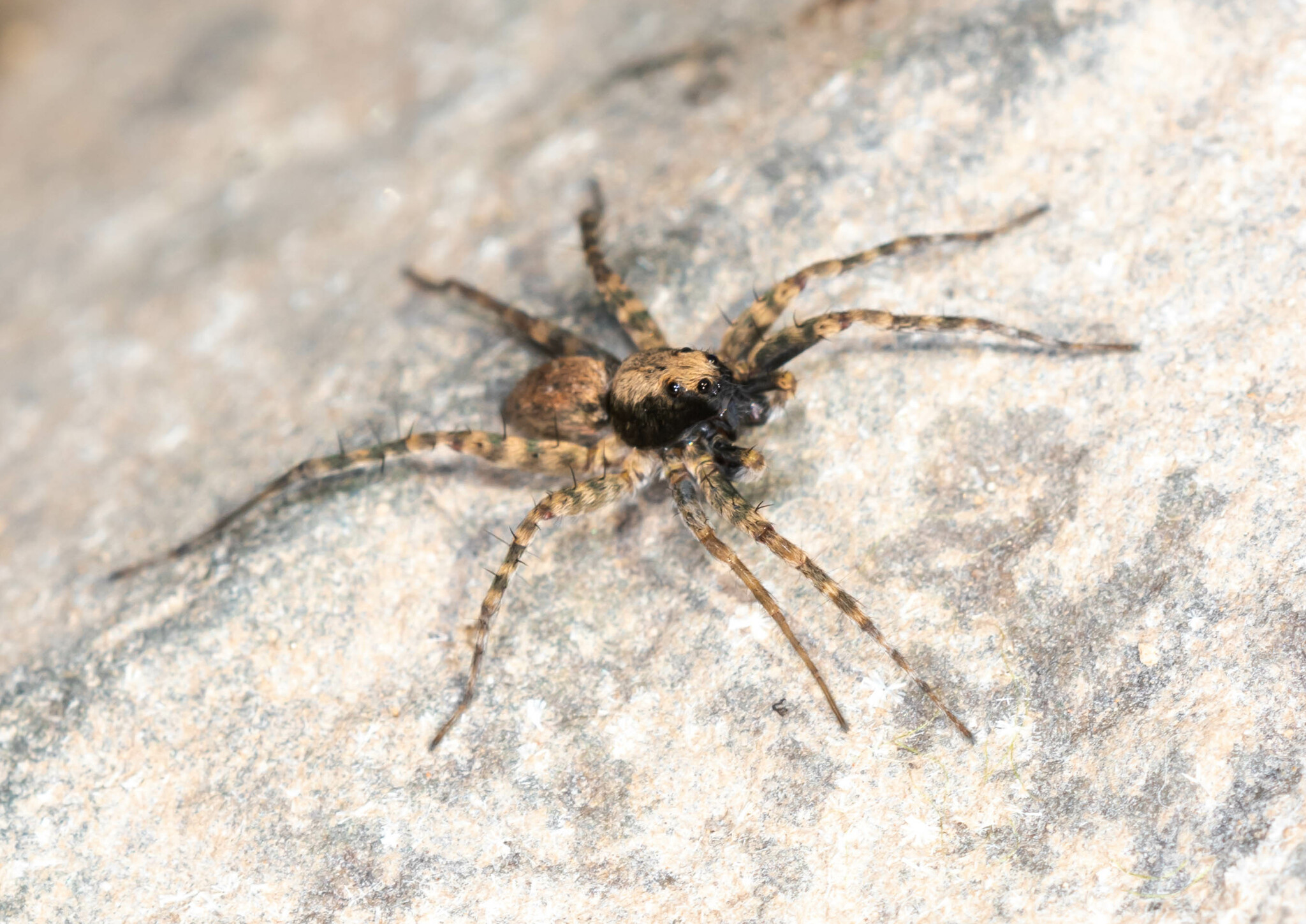
- W. fidelis from Thailand

Scientific classification
- Kingdom: Animalia
- Phylum: Arthropoda
- Subphylum: Chelicerata
- Class: Arachnida
- Order: Araneae
- Infraorder: Araneomorphae
- Family: Lycosidae
- Genus: Wadicosa; Zyuzin, 1985

Type species
- Wadicosa fidelis (O. Pickard-Cambridge, 1872)

Species
- See text

Diversity
- 19 species

= Wadicosa =

Genus of spiders

Wadicosa is a genus of wolf spiders, with 19 described species found from the Canary Islands to Indonesia.

== Etymology ==
The genus name Wadicosa is derived from the Arabic word واد "wadi" (meaning a dry riverbed or seasonal watercourse in arid regions) combined with the suffix "-cosa" commonly used in wolf spider genera (which are variations of Lycosa, from Greek λύκος "wolf"). This name reflects the characteristic habitat preference of these spiders for dried-up riverbeds with clay deposits in desert and semi-desert regions.

== Description ==
Wadicosa are medium-sized wolf spiders with a carapace length of 2.7–3.0 mm. They are characterized by having 2-2 ventral spines on the tibia and metatarsus of the first leg (not counting apical spines), and 3 teeth on the posterior margin of the cheliceral furrow. The distance between the anterior median eyes is 2.5–5.0 times greater than the distance between the median and lateral eyes of the same row.

Males have distinctive palpal structures with strongly sclerotized tegular processes directed outward, and a relatively large subtegulum displaced to the inner side of the bulbus. The abdomen displays a dark lanceolate spot dorsally with a series of light spots.

== Habitat and distribution ==
Species of Wadicosa are distributed in desert and semi-desert regions of the Palearctic realm. They are characteristic inhabitants of dried-up riverbeds (wadis) with clay deposits and are also found on clay riverbanks. They are active during daylight hours.

== Species ==
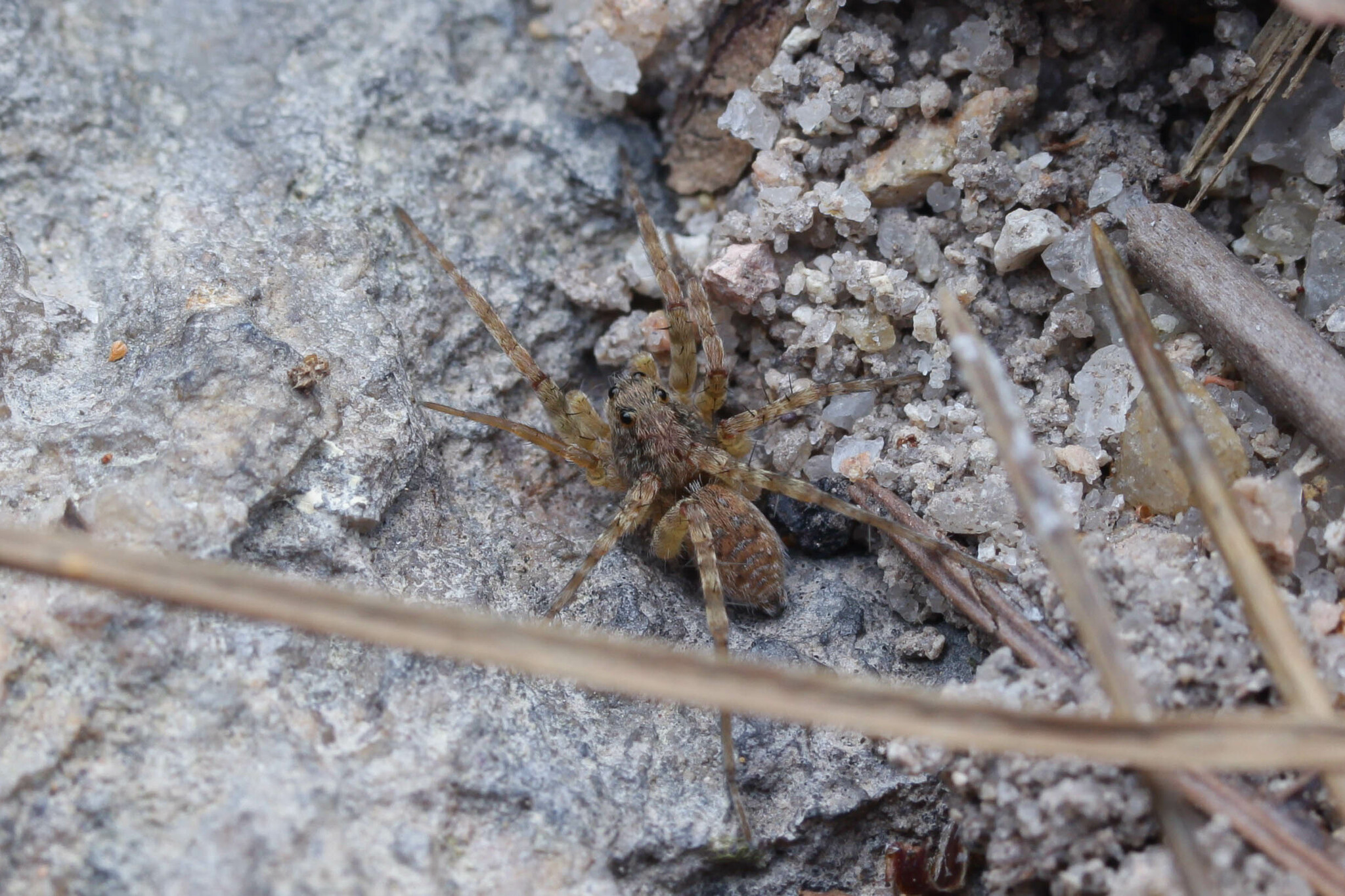
female W. fidelis

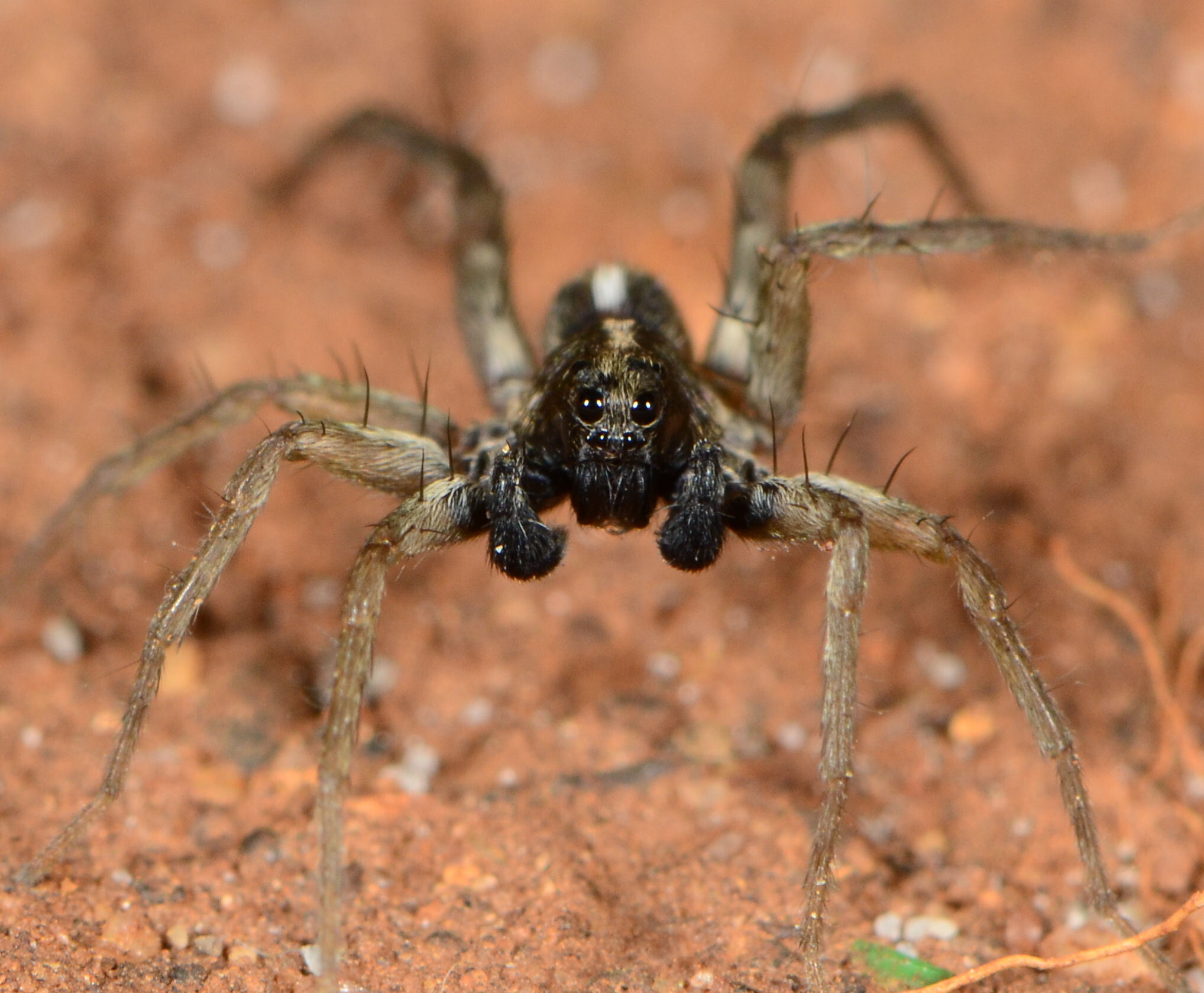
male W. oncka

As of October 2025, this genus includes nineteen species:

- Wadicosa arabica Kronestedt, Feulner & Roobas, 2024 – Oman, United Arab Emirates
- Wadicosa benadira (Caporiacco, 1940) – Somalia, Kenya
- Wadicosa bleyi (Dahl, 1908) – Papua New Guinea (Bismarck Arch.)
- Wadicosa cognata Kronestedt, 2015 – Kenya
- Wadicosa commoventa Zyuzin, 1985 – Iran, Turkmenistan
- Wadicosa enucleata (Roewer, 1959) – Ivory Coast, Togo, Nigeria, Central Africa, Kenya, Tanzania, Zambia, Malawi, Botswana, Zimbabwe, Mozambique, South Africa
- Wadicosa fidelis (O. Pickard-Cambridge, 1872) – Macaronesia, North Africa, Southern Europe, Turkey, Caucasus, Middle East, Central Asia, China, Japan, Pakistan, India, Bhutan, Bangladesh, Philippines, Indonesia (Sumatra) (type species)
- Wadicosa ghatica Kronestedt, 2017 – India
- Wadicosa intermediata Abhijith & Sudhikumar, 2024 – India
- Wadicosa jocquei Kronestedt, 2015 – Seychelles, Comoros, Mayotte, Madagascar, Mauritius
- Wadicosa mabweana (Roewer, 1959) – Equatorial Guinea, Gabon, DR Congo, Angola, Namibia
- Wadicosa manubriata (Simon, 1898) – DR Congo, Angola, Zambia, Namibia, Zimbabwe, Mozambique, South Africa
- Wadicosa okinawensis (Tanaka, 1985) – Japan (Ryukyu Is.), China, Laos
- Wadicosa oncka (Lawrence, 1927) – Africa
- Wadicosa paulyi Kronestedt, 2017 – Madagascar
- Wadicosa prasantae Ahmed, Anam, Saikia, Manthen & Saikia, 2014 – India
- Wadicosa quadrifer (Gravely, 1924) – India, Sri Lanka
- Wadicosa russellsmithi Kronestedt, 2015 – Mauritius
- Wadicosa sordidecolorata (Strand, 1906) – Ivory Coast, Cameroon, Ethiopia, Uganda
