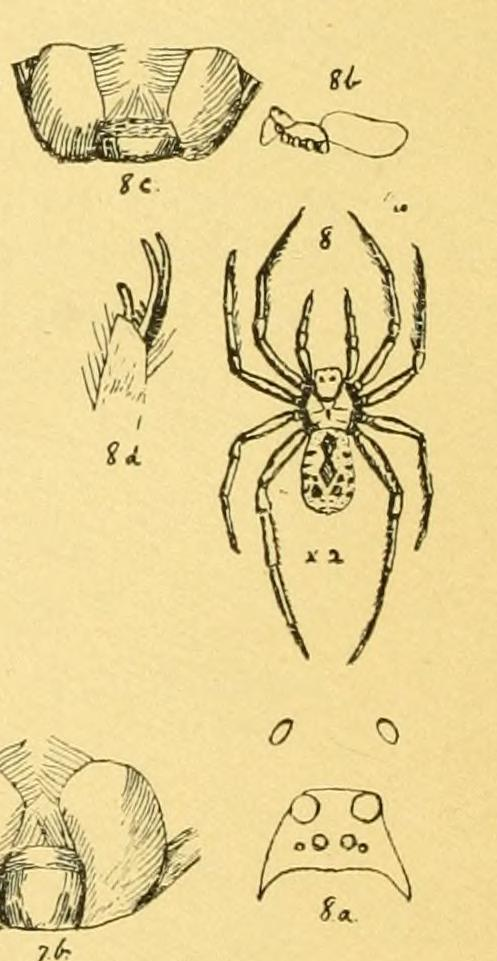
- Evippa douglasi

Scientific classification
- Kingdom: Animalia
- Phylum: Arthropoda
- Subphylum: Chelicerata
- Class: Arachnida
- Order: Araneae
- Infraorder: Araneomorphae
- Family: Lycosidae
- Genus: Evippa; Simon, 1882

Species
- 38 species (see text)

= Evippa =

Genus of spiders

Evippa is a genus of spiders in the family Lycosidae. As of 2026, it contains 38 species widely distributed in Asia and Africa.

== Species ==
Evippa comprises the following species:

- Evippa aculeata (Kroneberg, 1875) (Central Asia and Caucasus)
- Evippa aequalis Alderweireldt, 1991 (Burkina Faso, Senegal and Sudan)
- Evippa amitaii Armiach Steinpress, Alderweireldt, Cohen, Chipman & Gavish-Regev, 2021 (Israel, Iraq, Iran)
- Evippa arenaria (Audouin, 1826) (Sahara Desert, but likely introduced to Israel and UAE)
- Evippa badchysica Sternbergs, 1979 (southwestern Turkmenistan)
- Evippa banarensis Tikader & Malhotra, 1980 (Rajastan and likely neighbouring territories, India)
- Evippa baltoroi (Caporiacco, 1935) (India (Kashmir), Nepal, and western China)
- Evippa benevola (O. Pickard-Cambridge, 1885) (Iran)
- Evippa beschkentica Andreeva, 1976 (Kazakhstan, Tajikistan)
- Evippa brevicymbium Alderweireldt & Jocqué, 2017 (United Arab Emirates)
- Evippa caucasica Marusik, Guseinov & Koponen, 2003 (Azerbaijan)
- Evippa concolor (Kroneberg, 1875) (Tajikistan)
- Evippa douglasi Hogg, 1912 (China)
- Evippa eltonica Dunin, 1994 (Iran, northwestern Kazakhstan and Elton lake, Russia)
- Evippa fortis Roewer, 1955 (Iran and likely introduced to UAE)
- Evippa jabalpurensis Gajbe, 2004 (Eastern India)
- Evippa jocquei Alderweireldt, 1991 (North Africa and likely introduced to UAE)
- Evippa kazachstanica Ponomarev, 2007 (Kazakhstan)
- Evippa kirchshoferae Roewer, 1959 (Spain and Tunisia)
- Evippa lugubris Chen, Song & Kim, 1998 (Belarus, European Russia and Ukraine)
- Evippa luteipalpis Roewer, 1955 (Armenia, eastern Iran)
- Evippa massaica (Roewer, 1959) (Tanzania)
- Evippa nigerrima (Miller & Buchar, 1972) (Afghanistan)
- Evippa onager Simon, 1895 (Israel, Iran, Turkmenistan, China (Xinjiang))
- Evippa praelongipes (O. Pickard-Cambridge, 1871) (North Africa to Central and South Asia)
- Evippa projecta Alderweireldt, 1991 (Kenya)
- Evippa rajasthanea Tikader & Malhotra, 1980 (Rajasthan, India)
- Evippa rubiginosa Simon, 1885 (South India)
- Evippa russellsmithi Alderweireldt, 1991 (Ethiopia and Somalia)
- Evippa schenkeli Sternbergs, 1979 (southwestern Turkmenistan)
- Evippa shivajii Tikader & Malhotra, 1980
- Evippa sibirica Marusik, 1995 (from north-eastern Kazakhstan to Tuva and Gobi-Altai Aimak in Mongolia)
- Evippa sjostedti Schenkel, 1936 (Central Asia, mostly in Mongolia)
- Evippa soderbomi Schenkel, 1936 (Mongolia and northern China)
- Evippa sohani Tikader & Malhotra, 1980 (Maharashtra, India)
- Evippa solanensis Tikader & Malhotra, 1980 (northernmost India)
- Evippa strandi (Lessert, 1926) (Congo, DRC, Rwanda and Tanzania)
- Evippa turkmenica Sternbergs, 1979 (Kazakhstan, Turkmenistan)
