= Trabea varia =

Cape Trabea wolf spider

Scientific classification
- Kingdom: Animalia
- Phylum: Arthropoda
- Subphylum: Chelicerata
- Class: Arachnida
- Order: Araneae
- Infraorder: Araneomorphae
- Family: Lycosidae
- Genus: Trabea
- Species: T. varia

Binomial name
- Trabea varia Purcell, 1903

Species of spider

Trabea varia is a species of spider in the family Lycosidae. It is endemic to South Africa and is commonly known as the Cape Trabea wolf spider.

== Distribution ==
It is found in South Africa, where it is known from the Western Cape at altitudes ranging from 181 to 1601 m. Localities include the Cederberg, Clanwilliam, Cape Town, Mamre, Cederberg Wilderness Area, and Witteberg Nature Reserve.

== Habitat and ecology ==
Trabea varia is a free-running ground dweller sampled from the Fynbos biome.

== Conservation ==
Trabea varia is listed as Least Concern by the South African National Biodiversity Institute due to its wide range. It receives protection in the Cederberg Wilderness Area and Witteberg Nature Reserve.

== Taxonomy ==
Trabea varia was described by Purcell in 1903 from the Cederberg. The species was revised by Russell-Smith (1982) and is known from both sexes.
