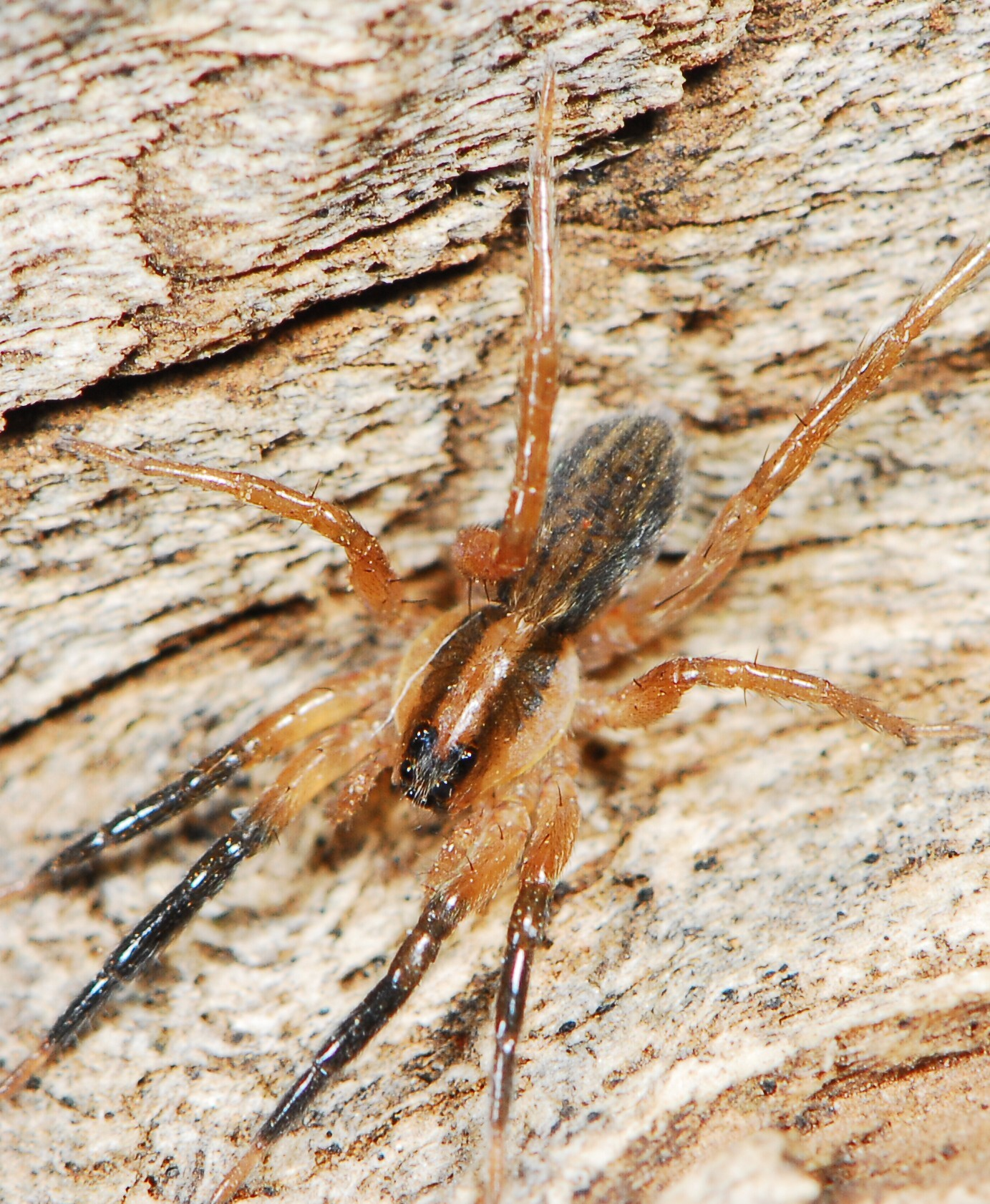
- Female
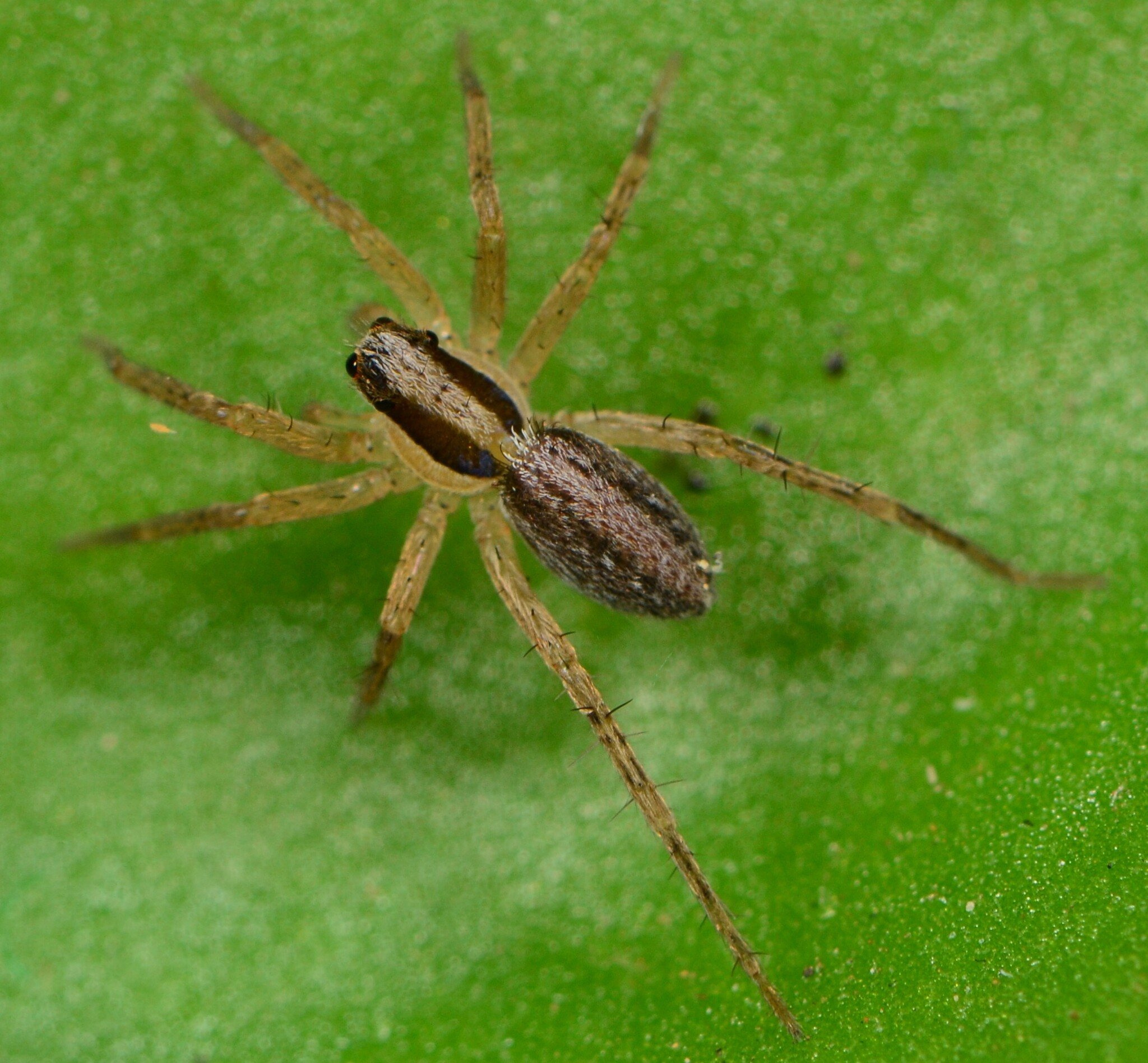
- Juvenile female

Scientific classification
- Kingdom: Animalia
- Phylum: Arthropoda
- Subphylum: Chelicerata
- Class: Arachnida
- Order: Araneae
- Infraorder: Araneomorphae
- Family: Lycosidae
- Genus: Trabea
- Species: T. purcelli

Binomial name
- Trabea purcelli Roewer, 1951

Synonyms
- Trabaea lineata Purcell, 1903

= Trabea purcelli =

Common Trabea wolf spider

Species of spider

Trabea purcelli is a species of spider in the family Lycosidae. It is found in Africa and is commonly known as the common Trabea wolf spider.

== Distribution ==
Trabea purcelli is found in the Democratic Republic of the Congo and South Africa.

In South Africa, it was sampled from all provinces at altitudes ranging from 52 to 2985 m.

== Habitat and ecology ==
Trabea purcelli is a free-running ground dweller sampled from the Grassland, Fynbos, Nama Karoo, and Savanna biomes. It has also been sampled in pistachio orchards.

== Description ==
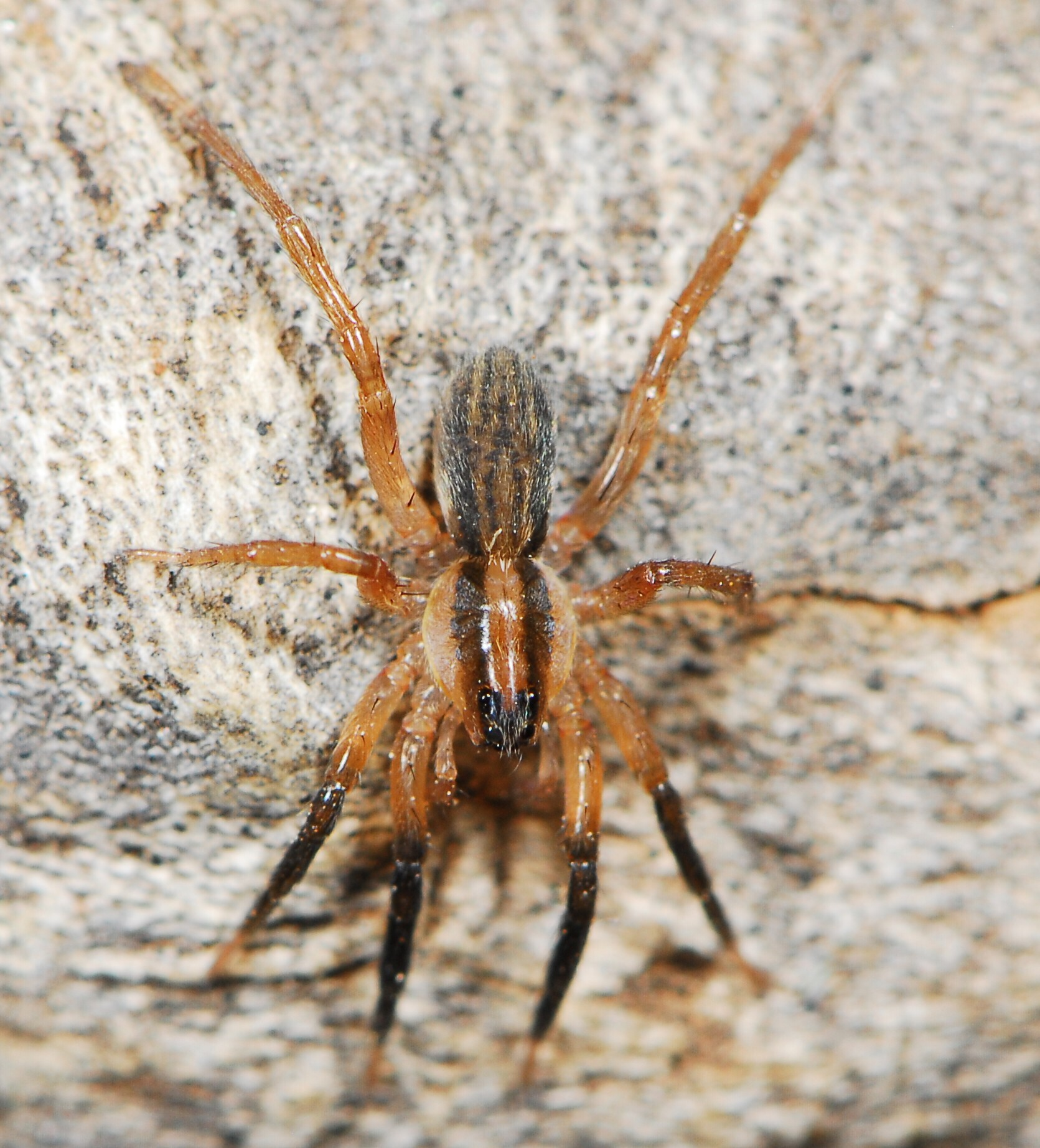
female

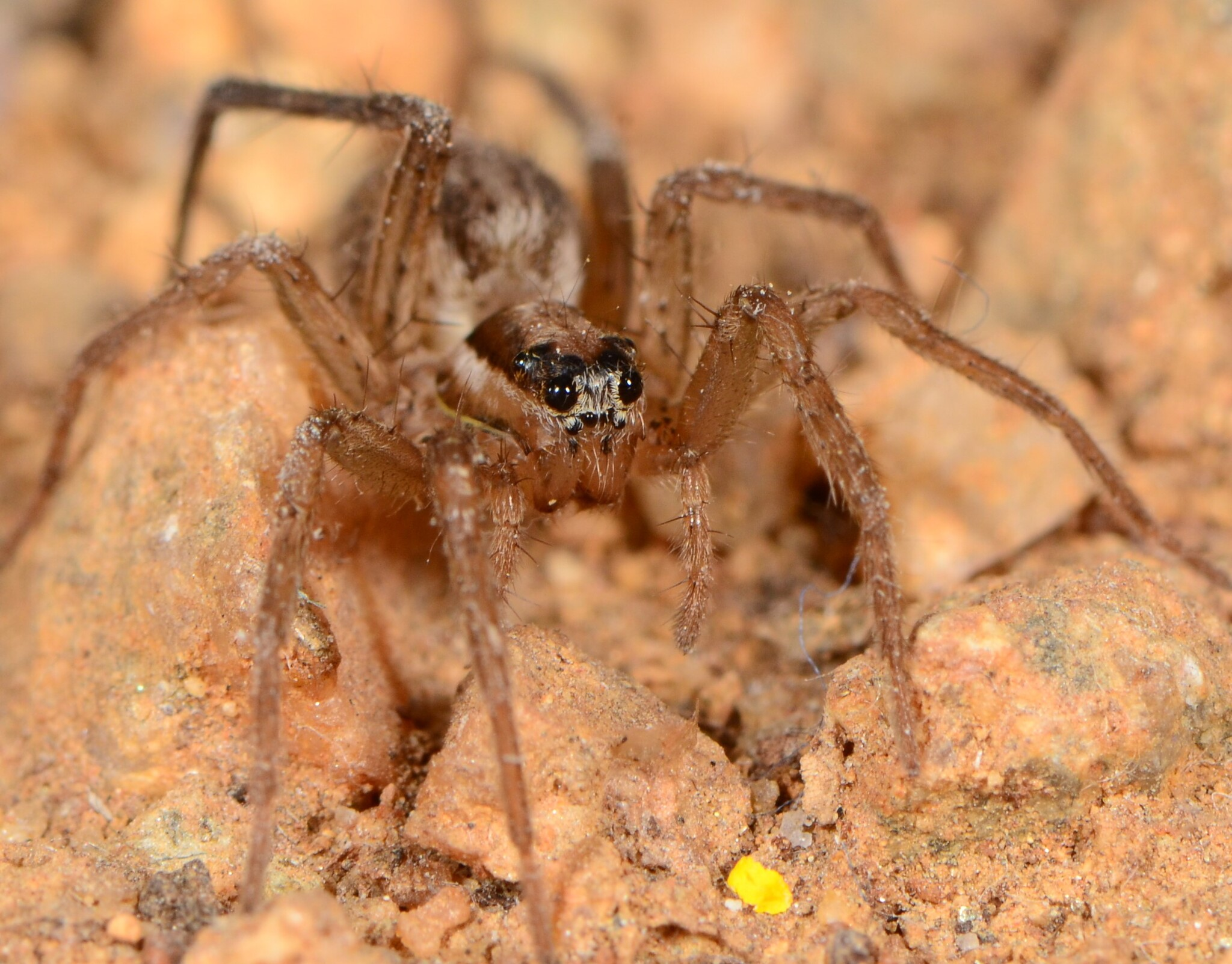
female

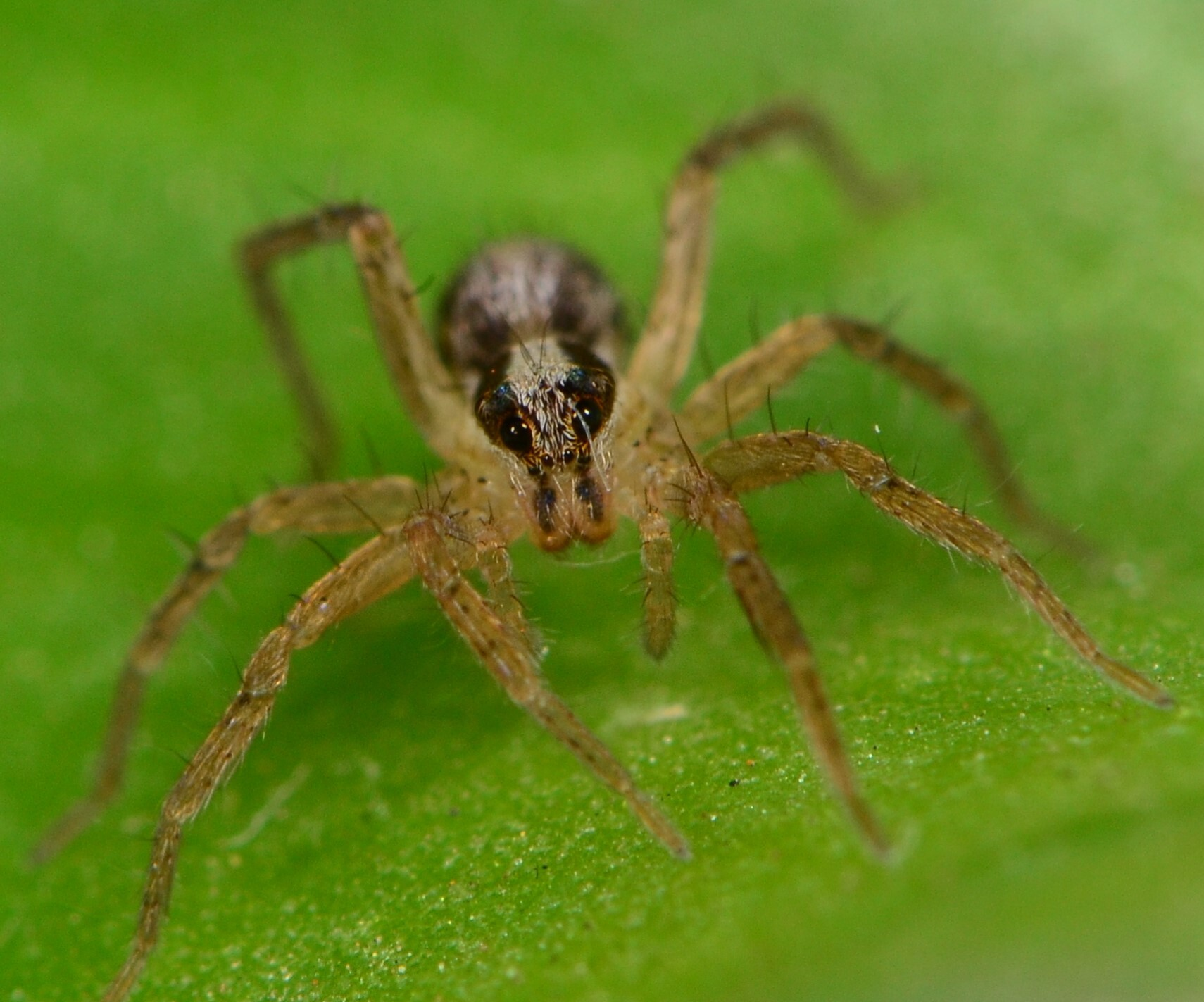
juvenile female

== Conservation ==
Trabea purcelli is listed as Least Concern by the South African National Biodiversity Institute due to its wide geographical range. It is protected in more than 10 protected areas.

== Etymology ==
The species is named after William Frederick Purcell, who originally described it as Trabaea lineata in 1903. The name was replaced by Roewer in 1951 because the original name was preoccupied.

== Taxonomy ==
Trabea purcelli was originally described by Purcell in 1903 from Kogmanskloof in the Western Cape as Trabaea lineata. However, this name was preoccupied, so Roewer provided the replacement name Trabea purcelli in 1951. The species was revised by Russell-Smith (1982) and is known from both sexes.
