= Trabea rubriceps =

Big eyed Trabea wolf spider

Scientific classification
- Kingdom: Animalia
- Phylum: Arthropoda
- Subphylum: Chelicerata
- Class: Arachnida
- Order: Araneae
- Infraorder: Araneomorphae
- Family: Lycosidae
- Genus: Trabea
- Species: T. rubriceps

Binomial name
- Trabea rubriceps Lawrence, 1952

Species of spider

Trabea rubriceps is a species of spider in the family Lycosidae. It is found in southern Africa and is commonly known as the big eyed Trabea wolf spider.

== Distribution ==
Trabea rubriceps is found in Lesotho and South Africa.

In South Africa, it was sampled from four provinces at altitudes ranging from 15 to 2584 m. Localities include Pietermaritzburg and Royal Natal National Park in KwaZulu-Natal, various sites in the Eastern Cape, Clocolan in the Free State, and several protected areas in the Western Cape including Table Mountain National Park, De Hoop Nature Reserve, Karoo National Park, and Bontebok National Park.

== Habitat and ecology ==
Trabea rubriceps is a free-running ground dweller sampled from the Fynbos, Grassland, Nama Karoo, and Savanna biomes.

== Conservation ==
Trabea rubriceps is listed as Least Concern by the South African National Biodiversity Institute. Although known only from the female, it has a wide geographical range. It is protected in more than 8 protected areas.

== Taxonomy ==
Trabea rubriceps was described by Lawrence in 1952 from Pietermaritzburg. The species was revised by Russell-Smith (1982). The male was first described by Russell-Smith and Logunov in 2025.
