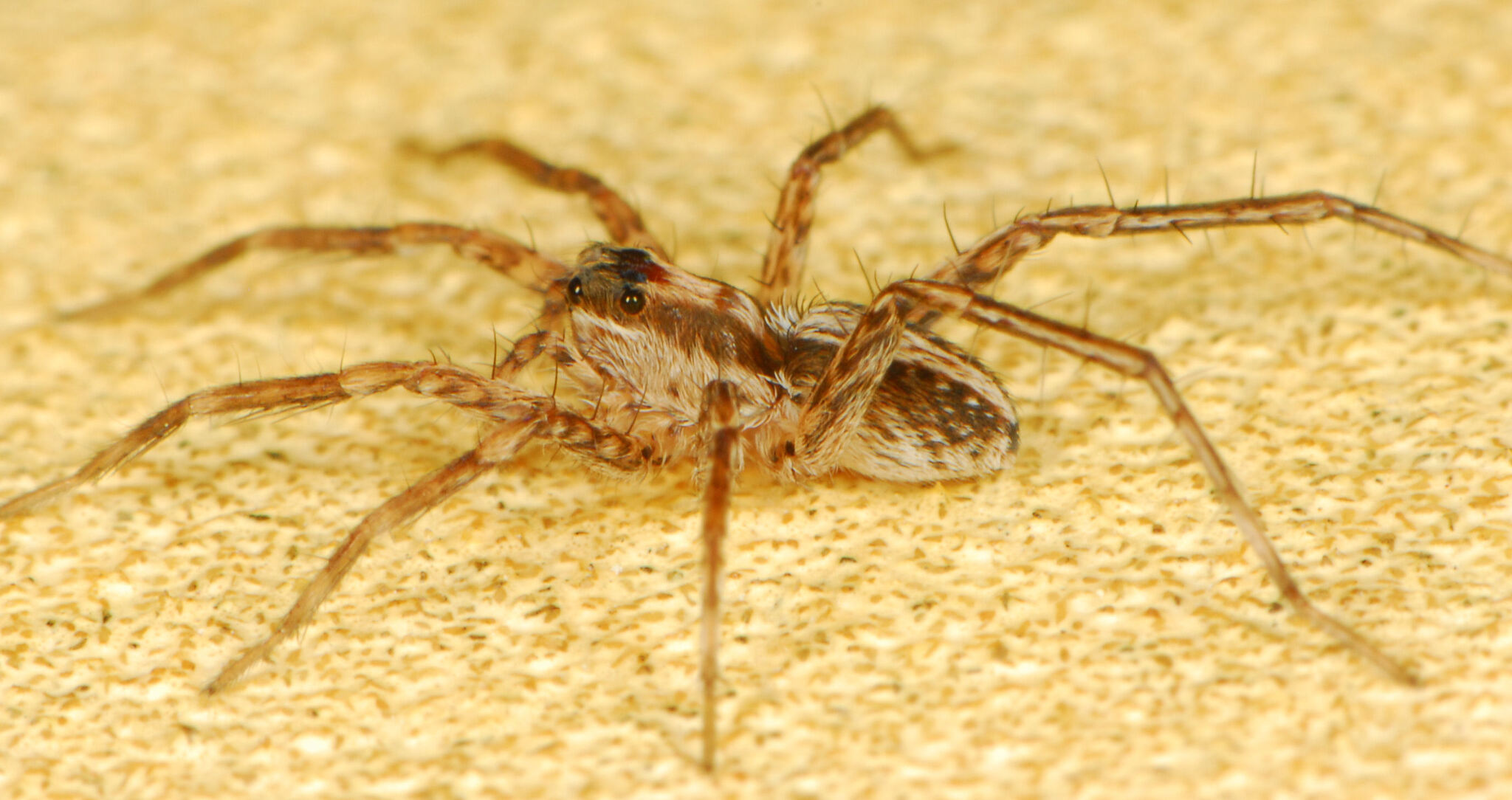
- Female
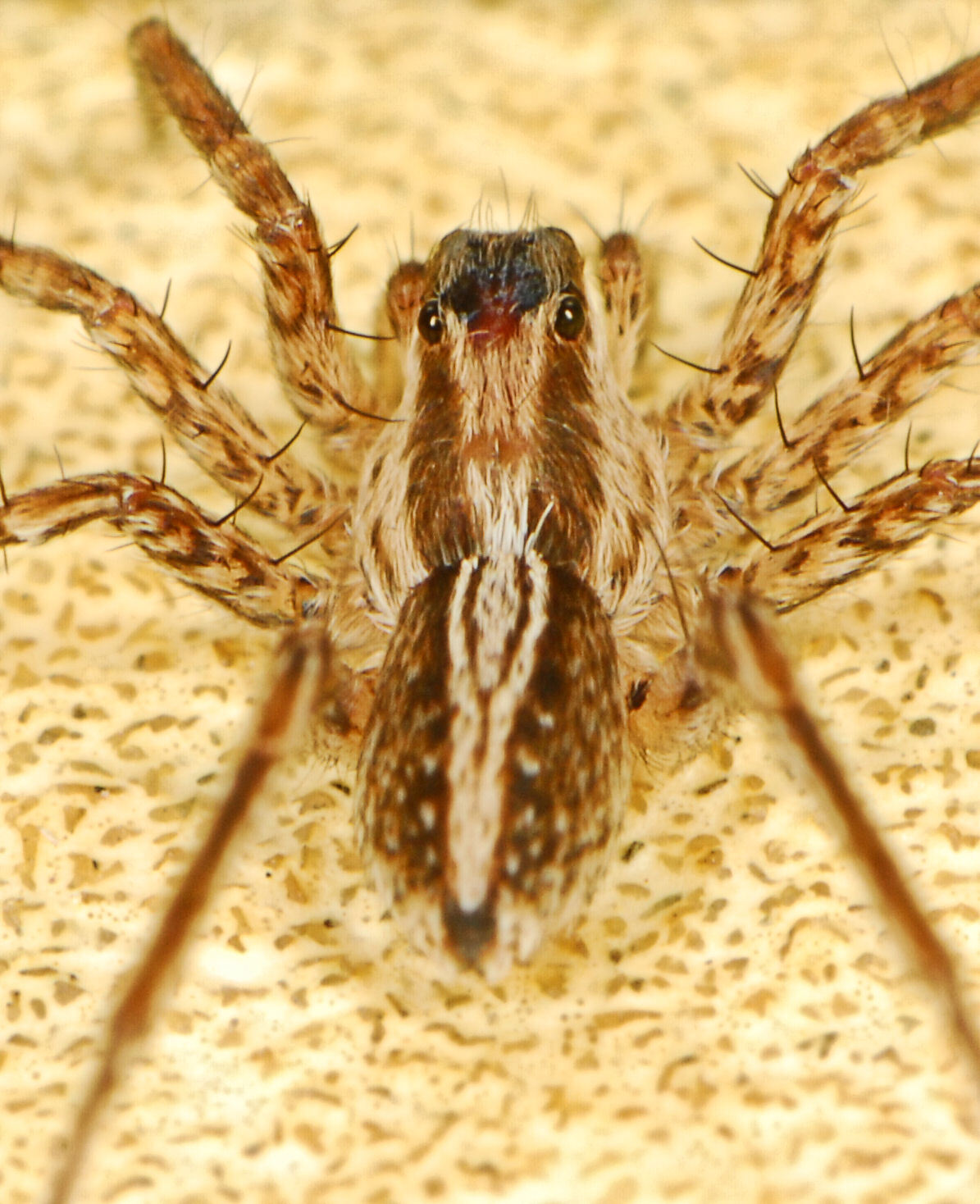
- Female

Scientific classification
- Kingdom: Animalia
- Phylum: Arthropoda
- Subphylum: Chelicerata
- Class: Arachnida
- Order: Araneae
- Infraorder: Araneomorphae
- Family: Lycosidae
- Genus: Trabea
- Species: T. heteroculata

Binomial name
- Trabea heteroculata Strand, 1913

= Trabea heteroculata =

Rwanda Trabea wolf spider

Species of spider

Trabea heteroculata is a species of spider in the family Lycosidae. It is found in Africa and is commonly known as the Rwanda Trabea wolf spider.

== Distribution ==
Trabea heteroculata is found in Kenya, Rwanda, Tanzania, and South Africa.

In South Africa, it is recorded from Limpopo at altitudes ranging from 534 to 1341 m. Localities include Lhuvhondo Nature Reserve, Tshipise, Lekgalameetse Nature Reserve, Blouberg Nature Reserve, and Naboomspruit.

== Habitat and ecology ==
Trabea heteroculata is a free-running ground dweller sampled from the Savanna biome.

== Conservation ==
Trabea heteroculata is listed as Least Concern by the South African National Biodiversity Institute due to its wide geographical range. It is protected in Lhuvhondo Nature Reserve, Lekgalameetse Nature Reserve, and Blouberg Nature Reserve.

== Taxonomy ==
Trabea heteroculata was described by Strand in 1913 from Rwanda. The species was revised by Russell-Smith (1982) and is known from both sexes.
