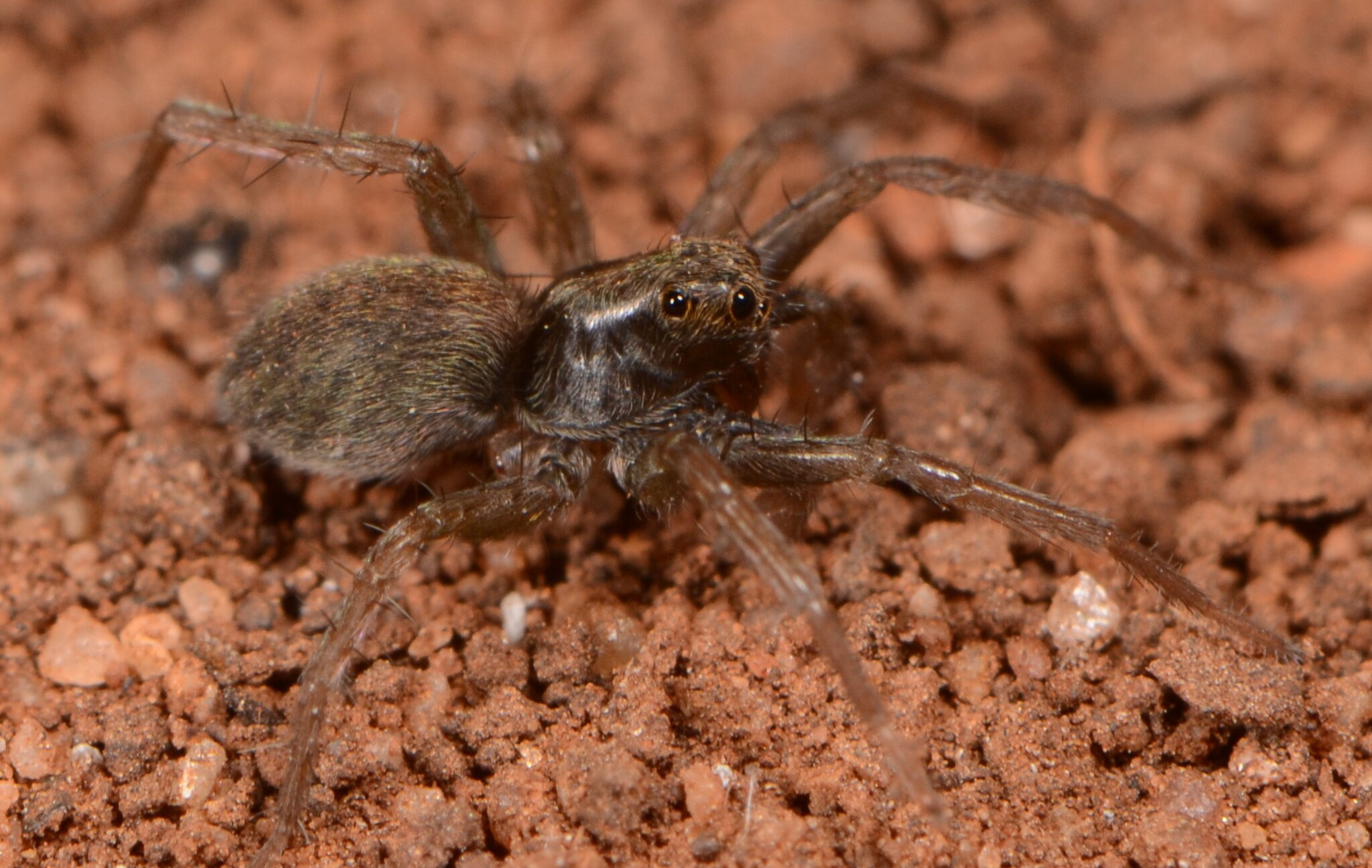
- Female T. ornatipalpis
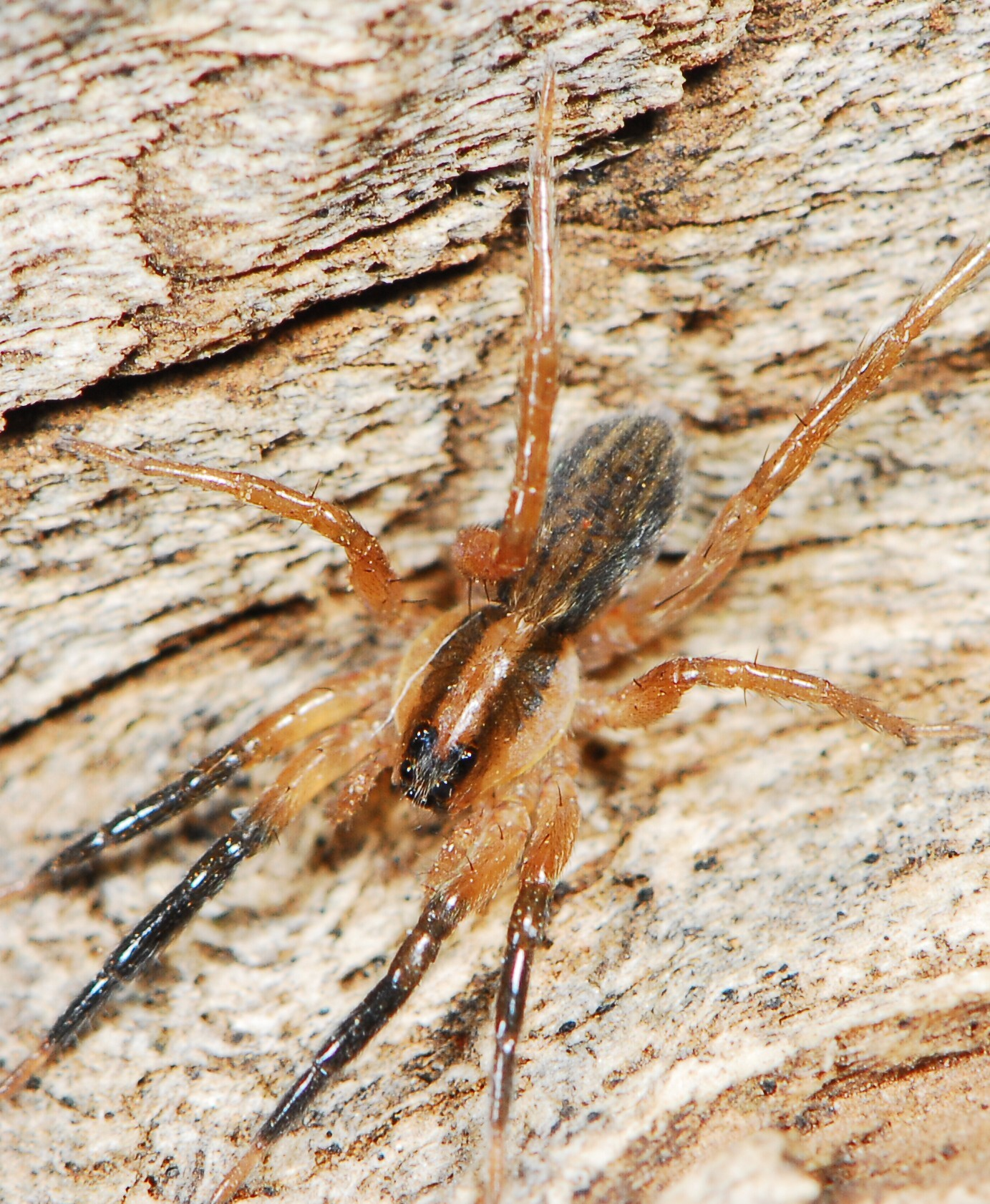
- Female T. purcelli

Scientific classification
- Kingdom: Animalia
- Phylum: Arthropoda
- Subphylum: Chelicerata
- Class: Arachnida
- Order: Araneae
- Infraorder: Araneomorphae
- Family: Lycosidae
- Genus: Trabea; Simon, 1876

Type species
- T. paradoxa Simon, 1876

Species
- 16, see text

Synonyms
- Trabaeosa

= Trabea (spider) =

Genus of spiders

Trabea is an African genus of wolf spiders, with two species found in Europe. It was first described by Eugène Simon in 1876.

== Description ==
Trabea are small to large spiders ranging from 3.1 to 7.8 mm in length. The sexes are alike with slight colour dimorphism in some species.

The carapace is normally high with a markedly square-fronted appearance due to enlargement of the second row of eyes. Two longitudinal brown bands extend from behind the posterior eyes, though a few species lack distinct markings. The anterior row of eyes is strongly procurved with eyes either equidistant or with the lateral eyes further from the median eyes than the distance between the median eyes themselves. The second row eyes are much enlarged relative to the width of the anterior row, and the width of the posterior row is greater than the second row. The region of all eyes is blackened.

== Life style ==
Very little has been reported on the biology of Trabea species. Russell-Smith (1982) observed the South African species T. nigriceps running actively in open grassland on a dry hillside at Grahamstown.

The raised carapace and black pedipalps give this species a strong superficial resemblance to some southern African species of Pardosa such as P. crassipalpis. By contrast, T. ornatipalpis and T. rubriceps have only been found in shady places in tussocky plants and under stones.

Trabea heteroculata from East Africa and T. ornatipalpis appear to be restricted to montane areas where they have been found between 2000 and 3000 m.

== Species ==
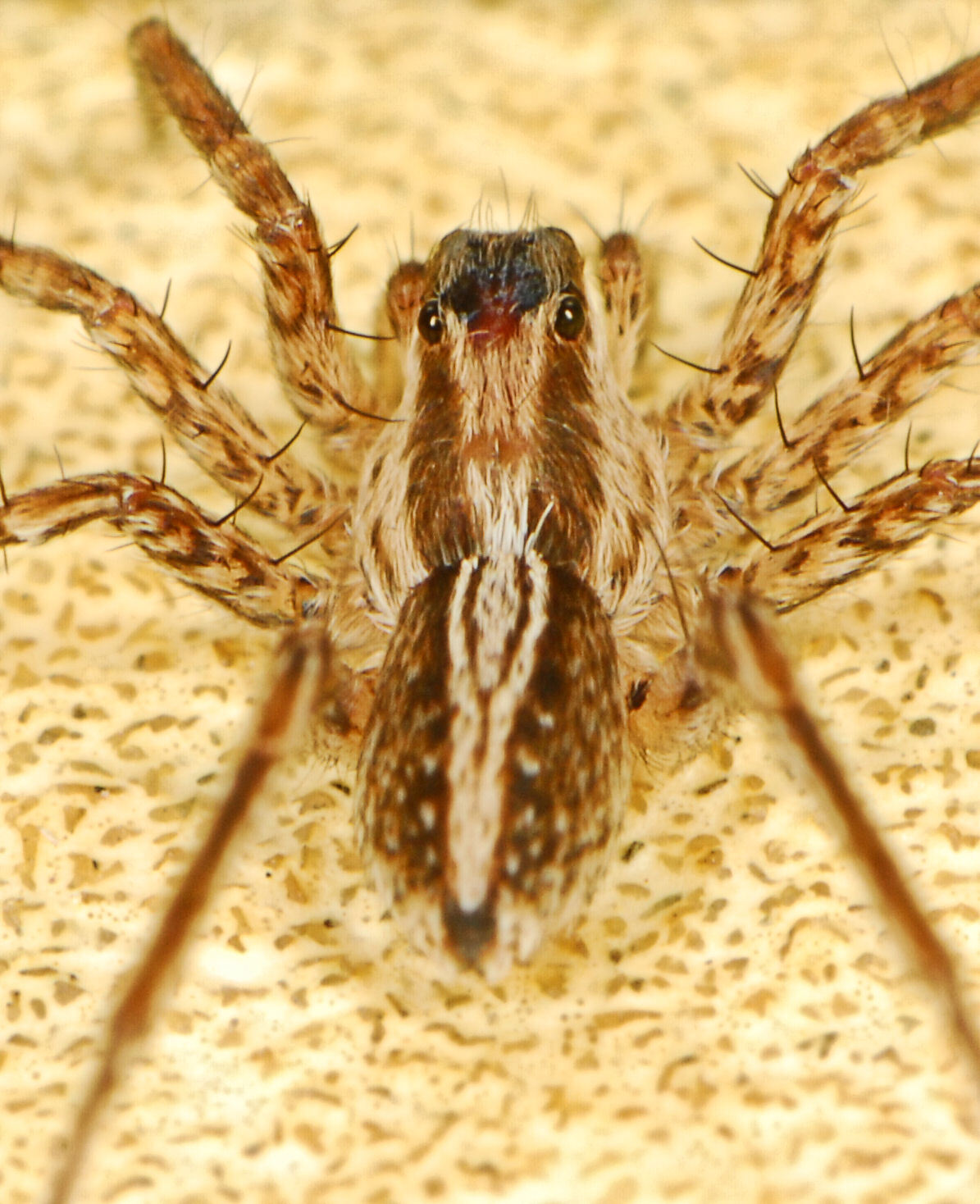
female T. heteroculata

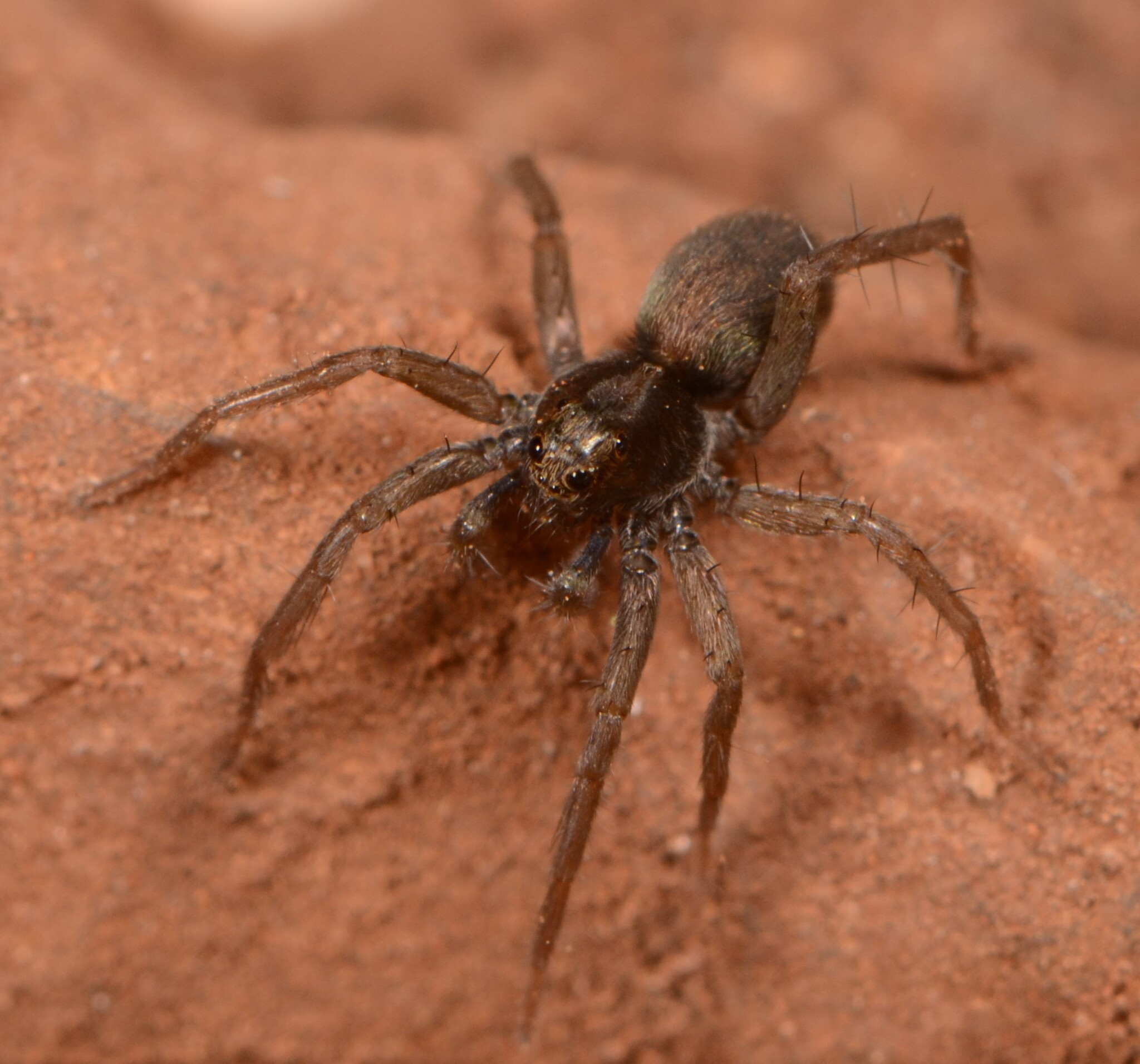
female T. ornatipalpis

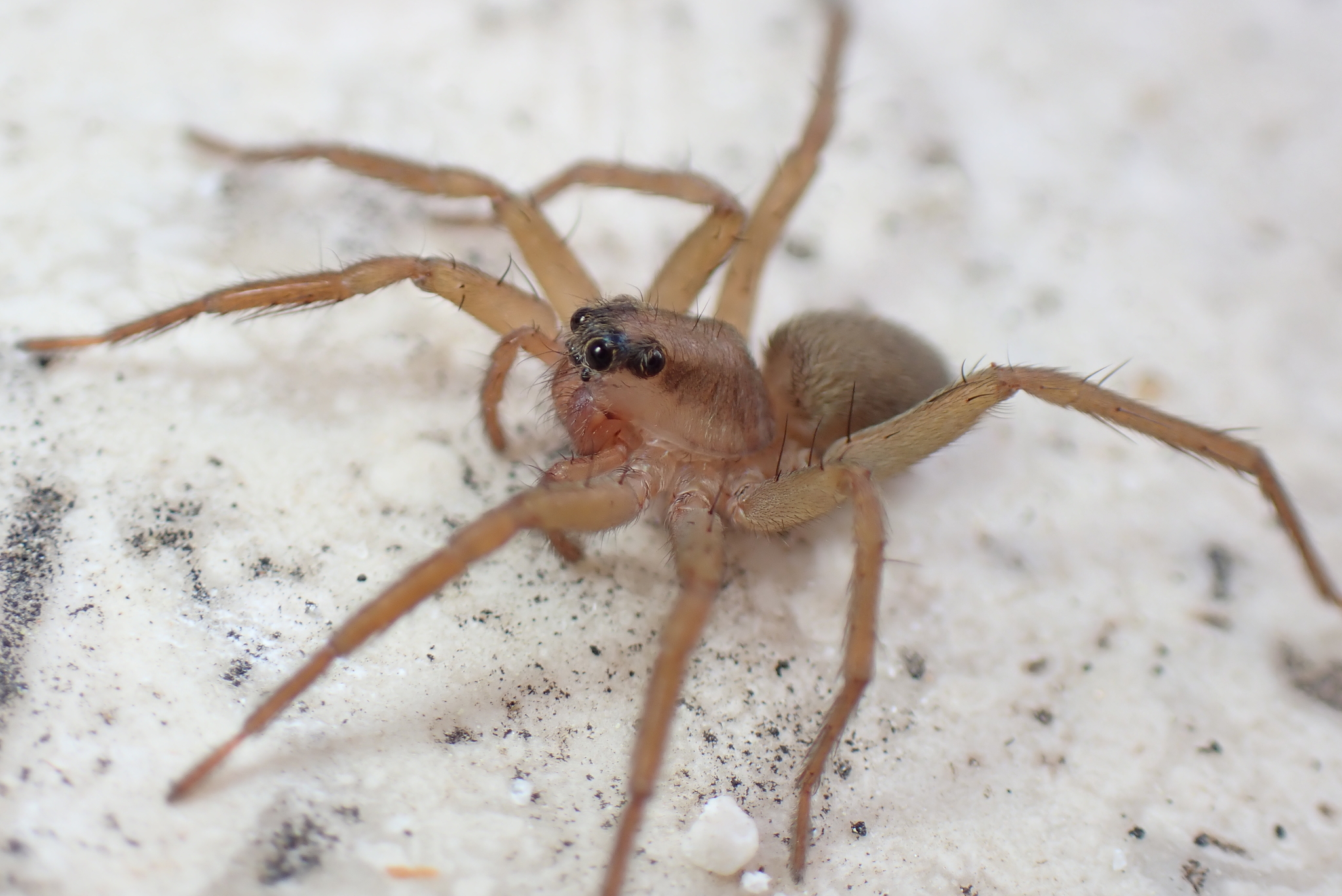
T. paradoxa

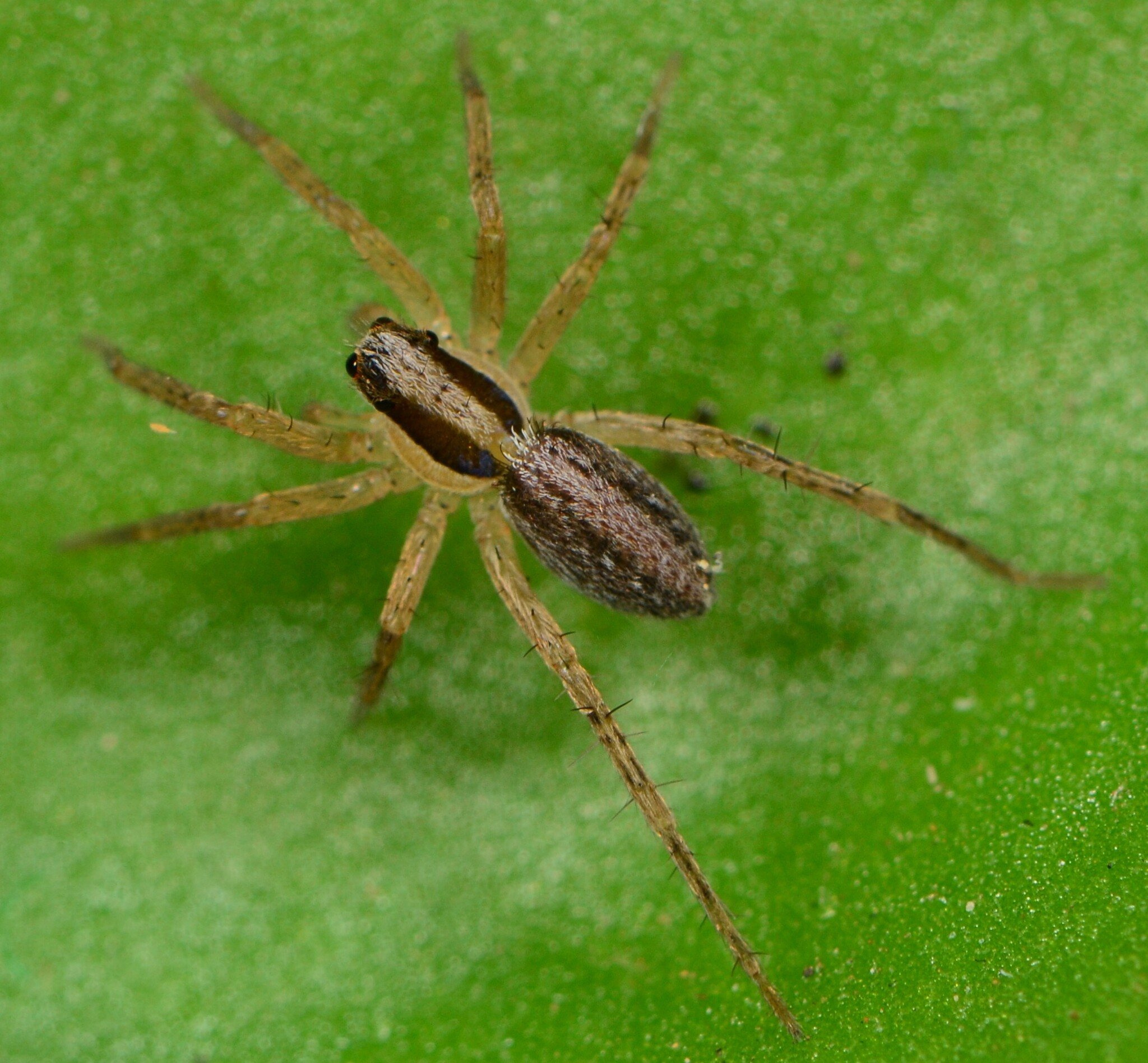
juvenile T. purcelli

As of October 2025, this genus includes sixteen species:

- Trabea bipunctata (Roewer, 1959) – DR Congo, Rwanda, Malawi, Ethiopia
- Trabea cazorla Snazell, 1983 – Spain, Morocco, Algeria
- Trabea henrardi Alderweireldt & Jocqué, 2022 – Ivory Coast
- Trabea heteroculata Strand, 1913 – Kenya, Rwanda, Tanzania, South Africa
- Trabea hirsuta Russell-Smith & Logunov, 2025 – South Africa
- Trabea natalensis Russell-Smith, 1982 – South Africa, Lesotho
- Trabea nigriceps Purcell, 1903 – South Africa
- Trabea nigristernis Alderweireldt, 1999 – Malawi
- Trabea obscura Russell-Smith & Logunov, 2025 – South Africa
- Trabea ornatipalpis Russell-Smith, 1982 – South Africa
- Trabea paradoxa Simon, 1876 – Southern Europe, Turkey (type species)
- Trabea purcelli Roewer, 1951 – DR Congo, South Africa
- Trabea rubriceps Lawrence, 1952 – South Africa, Lesotho
- Trabea setula Alderweireldt, 1999 – Malawi
- Trabea unicolor Purcell, 1903 – South Africa
- Trabea varia Purcell, 1903 – South Africa
