= Trabea unicolor =

Unicolor Trabea wolf spider

Scientific classification
- Kingdom: Animalia
- Phylum: Arthropoda
- Subphylum: Chelicerata
- Class: Arachnida
- Order: Araneae
- Infraorder: Araneomorphae
- Family: Lycosidae
- Genus: Trabea
- Species: T. unicolor

Binomial name
- Trabea unicolor Purcell, 1903

Species of spider

Trabea unicolor is a species of spider in the family Lycosidae. It is endemic to South Africa and is commonly known as the unicolor Trabea wolf spider.

== Distribution ==
Trabea unicolor is found in South Africa.

In South Africa, it is known from the Western Cape at altitudes ranging from 6 to 462 m. Localities include Franschoek, Fernkloof Nature Reserve, Hermanus, and De Hoop Nature Reserve.

== Habitat and ecology ==
Trabea unicolor is a free-running ground dweller sampled in the Fynbos biome.

== Conservation ==
Trabea unicolor is listed as Data Deficient for Taxonomic reasons by the South African National Biodiversity Institute. More sampling is needed to collect the female and determine the species' range. It is protected in Fernkloof Nature Reserve and De Hoop Nature Reserve.

== Taxonomy ==
Trabea unicolor was described by Purcell in 1903 from Franschoek. The species was revised by Russell-Smith (1982) and is known only from the male.
