= Trabea nigriceps =

Eastern Cape Trabea wolf spider

Scientific classification
- Kingdom: Animalia
- Phylum: Arthropoda
- Subphylum: Chelicerata
- Class: Arachnida
- Order: Araneae
- Infraorder: Araneomorphae
- Family: Lycosidae
- Genus: Trabea
- Species: T. nigriceps

Binomial name
- Trabea nigriceps Purcell, 1903

Species of spider

Trabea nigriceps is a species of spider in the family Lycosidae. It is endemic to South Africa and is commonly known as the Eastern Cape Trabea wolf spider.

== Distribution ==
Trabea nigriceps is found in South Africa.

In South Africa, it is known from the Eastern Cape at altitudes ranging from 206 to 1652 m. Localities include Alexandria, Grahamstown, Suurberg, Addo Elephant National Park, Asante Sana Private Game Reserve, and Mpofu Nature Reserve.

== Habitat and ecology ==
Trabea nigriceps is a free-running ground dweller sampled from the Thicket biome. Russell-Smith (1982) observed this species running actively in open grassland on a dry hillside at Grahamstown.

== Conservation ==
Trabea nigriceps is listed as Least Concern by the South African National Biodiversity Institute due to its wide distribution. The species has been sampled in and around the type locality including three protected areas: Asante Sana Game Reserve, Addo Elephant National Park, and Mpofu Nature Reserve.

== Taxonomy ==
Trabea nigriceps was described by Purcell in 1903 from Alexandria. The species was revised by Russell-Smith (1982) and is known from both sexes.
