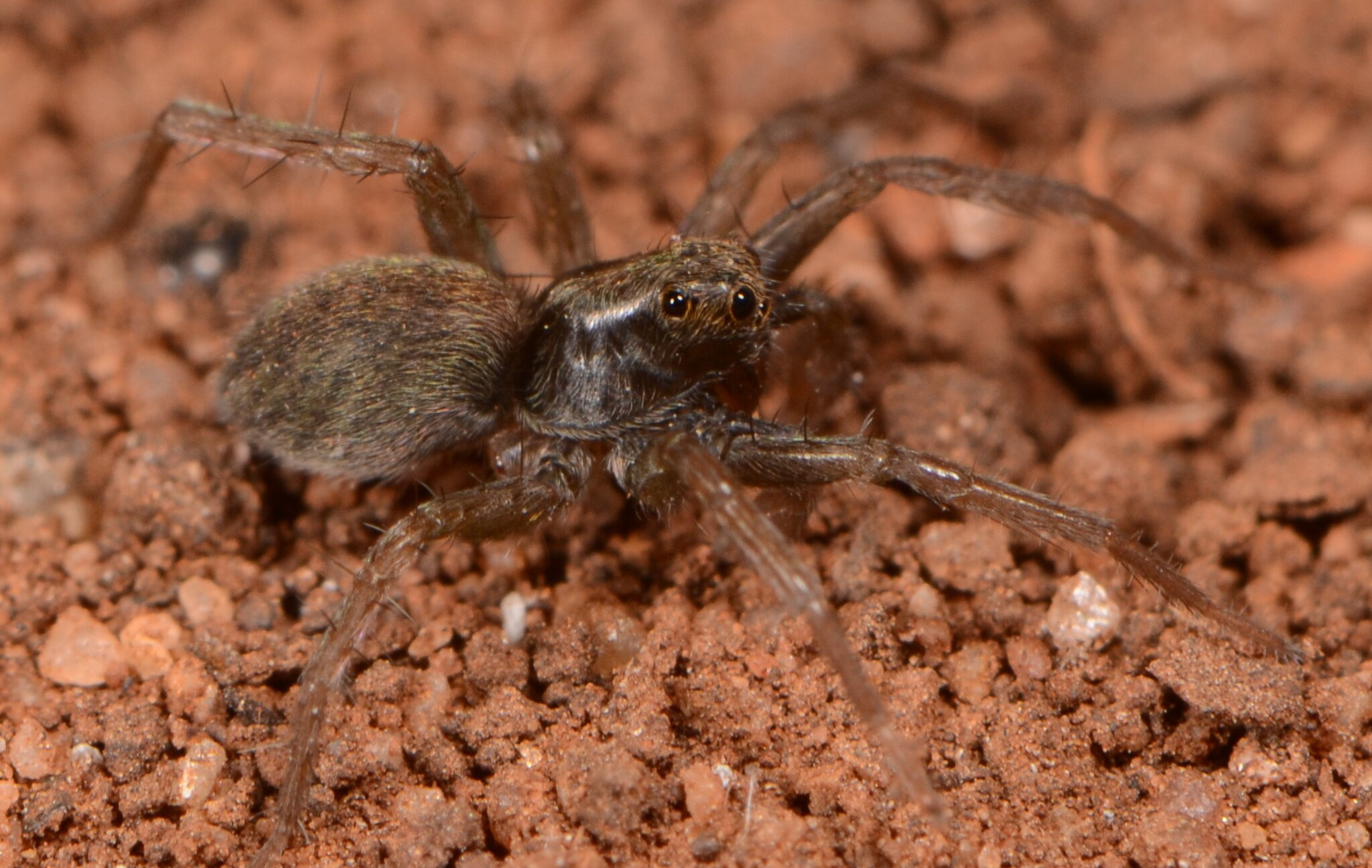
- Female
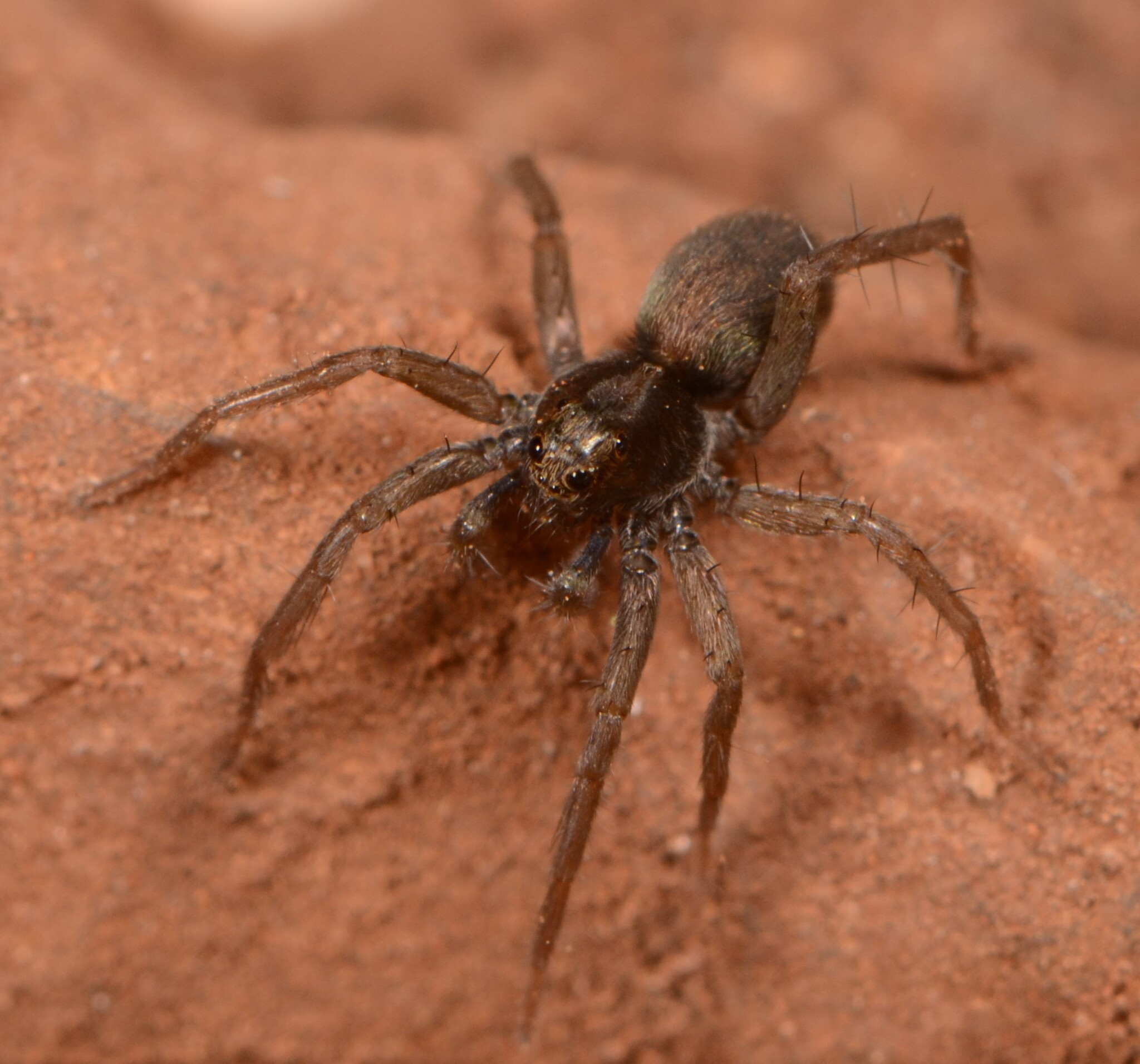
- Female

Scientific classification
- Kingdom: Animalia
- Phylum: Arthropoda
- Subphylum: Chelicerata
- Class: Arachnida
- Order: Araneae
- Infraorder: Araneomorphae
- Family: Lycosidae
- Genus: Trabea
- Species: T. ornatipalpis

Binomial name
- Trabea ornatipalpis Russell-Smith, 1982

= Trabea ornatipalpis =

Fancy palp Trabea wolf spider

Species of spider

Trabea ornatipalpis is a species of spider in the family Lycosidae. It is endemic to South Africa and is commonly known as the fancy palp Trabea wolf spider.

== Distribution ==
Trabea ornatipalpis is found in South Africa.

In South Africa, it is recorded from six provinces at altitudes ranging from 6 to 1703 m. Localities include Table Mountain National Park in the Western Cape, Royal Natal National Park in KwaZulu-Natal, Hogsback in the Eastern Cape, Irene in Gauteng, Ben Lavin Nature Reserve in Limpopo, Hopetown and Benfontein Nature Reserve in the Northern Cape, and Cederberg Wilderness Area.

== Habitat and ecology ==
Trabea ornatipalpis is a free-running ground dweller sampled from the Fynbos, Grassland, and Savanna biomes.

== Description ==
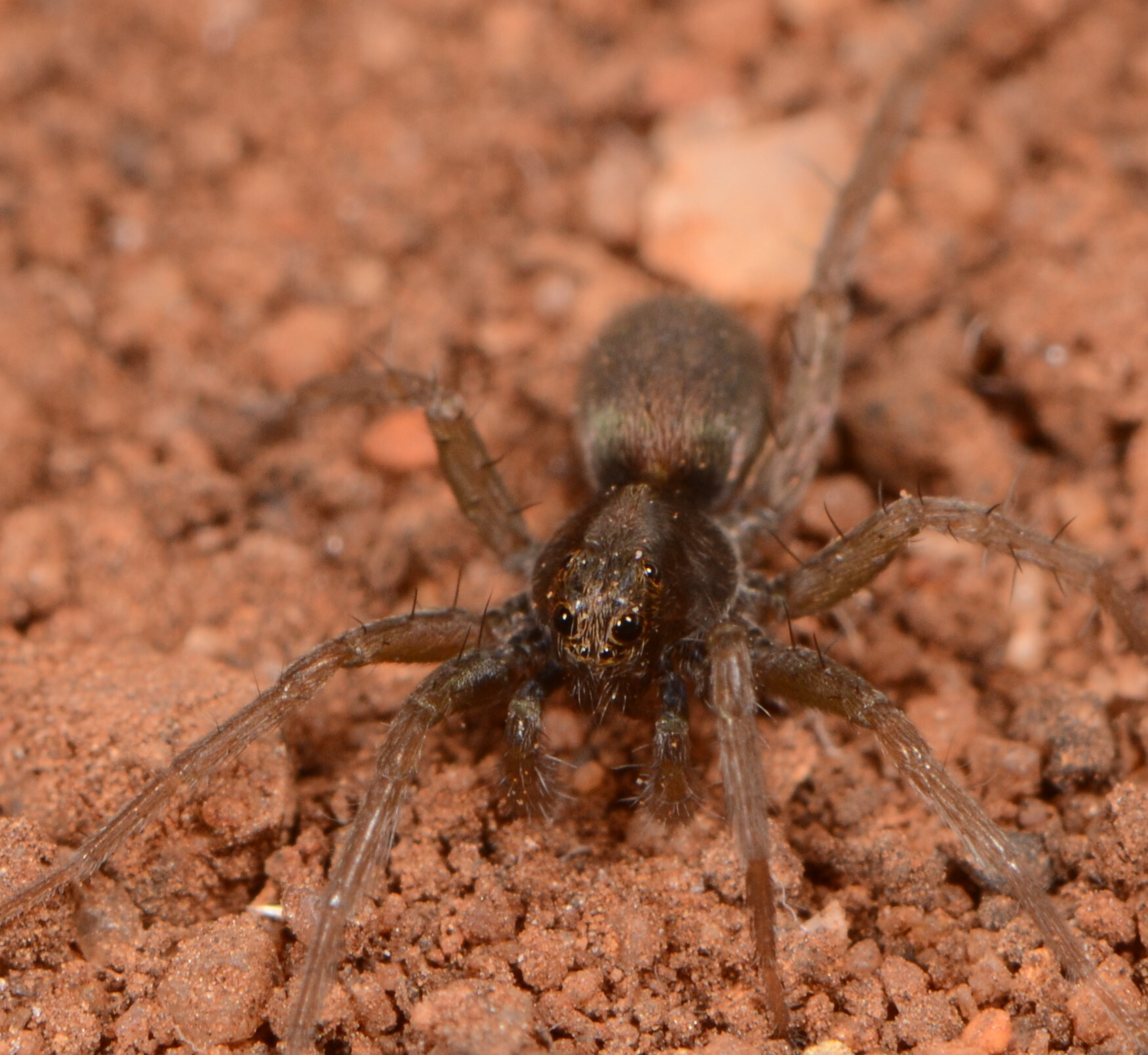
female

== Conservation ==
Trabea ornatipalpis is listed as Least Concern by the South African National Biodiversity Institute due to its wide geographical range. It is protected in Royal Natal National Park, Ben Lavin Nature Reserve, Table Mountain National Park, and Benfontein Nature Reserve.

== Taxonomy ==
Trabea ornatipalpis was described by Russell-Smith in 1982 from Table Mountain National Park. The species is known from both sexes.
