= Trabea natalensis =

Natal Trabea wolf spider

Scientific classification
- Kingdom: Animalia
- Phylum: Arthropoda
- Subphylum: Chelicerata
- Class: Arachnida
- Order: Araneae
- Infraorder: Araneomorphae
- Family: Lycosidae
- Genus: Trabea
- Species: T. natalensis

Binomial name
- Trabea natalensis Russell-Smith, 1982

Species of spider

Trabea natalensis is a species of spider in the family Lycosidae. It is found in southern Africa and is commonly known as the Natal Trabea wolf spider.

== Distribution ==
Trabea natalensis is found in Lesotho and South Africa.

In South Africa, it is recorded from KwaZulu-Natal and Limpopo at altitudes ranging from 522 to 2892 m. Localities include Pietermaritzburg, Sani Pass at various altitudes, and Lekgalameetse Nature Reserve.

== Habitat and ecology ==
Trabea natalensis is a free-running ground dweller sampled from the Grassland and Savanna biomes.

== Conservation ==
Trabea natalensis is listed as Least Concern by the South African National Biodiversity Institute due to its wide distribution. It is protected in Lekgalameetse Nature Reserve and Sehlabathebe National Park in Lesotho.

== Taxonomy ==
Trabea natalensis was described by Russell-Smith in 1982 from Pietermaritzburg. The female was first described by Russell-Smith and Logunov in 2025.
