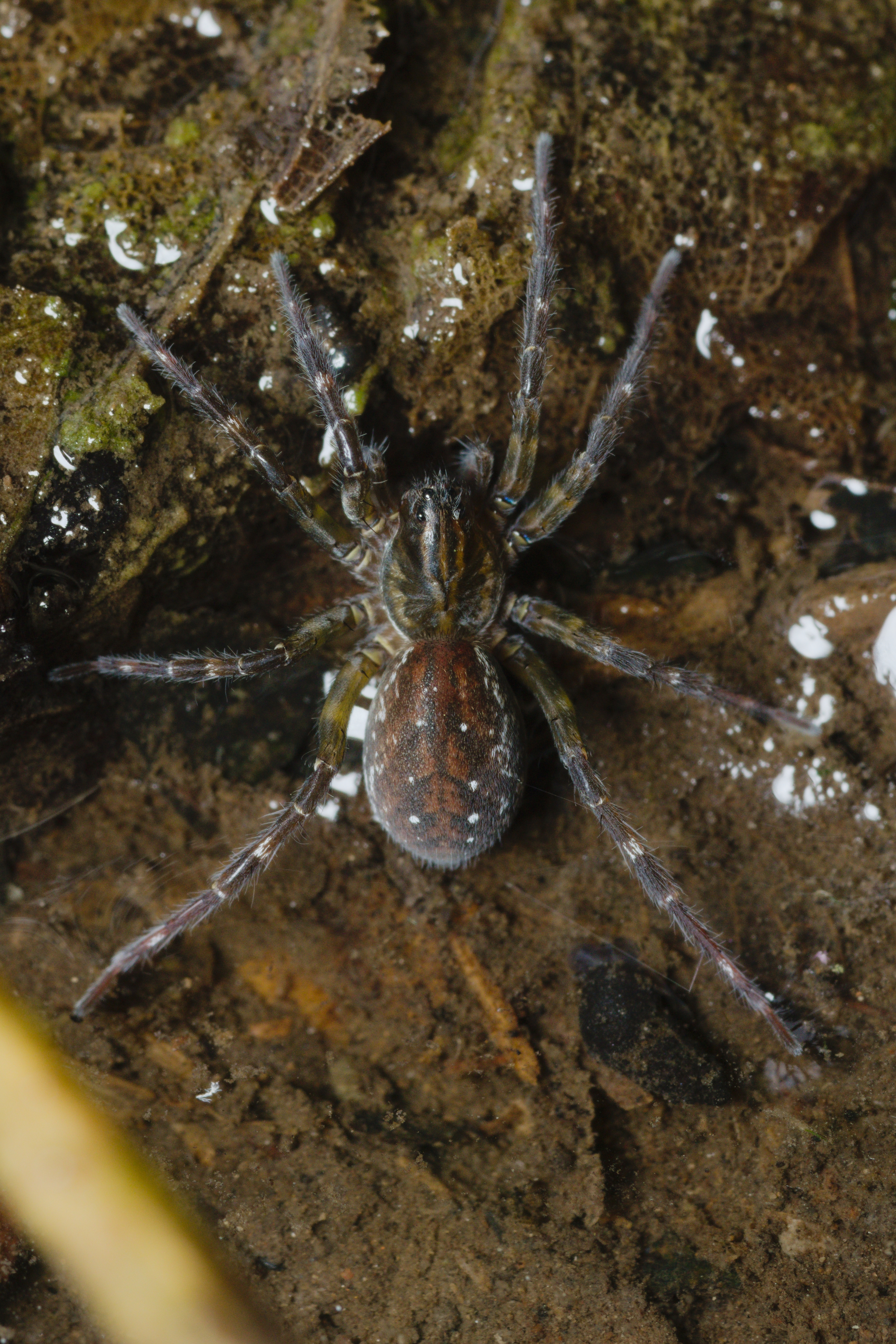
- Piratula cf. hygrophila

Scientific classification
- Kingdom: Animalia
- Phylum: Arthropoda
- Subphylum: Chelicerata
- Class: Arachnida
- Order: Araneae
- Infraorder: Araneomorphae
- Family: Lycosidae
- Genus: Piratula; Roewer, 1960

Species
- See text

= Piratula =

Genus of spiders

Piratula is a genus of wolf spiders first circumscribed in 1960. Its 26 species are found mainly in Asia, with a few found in Europe and North America.

== Species ==
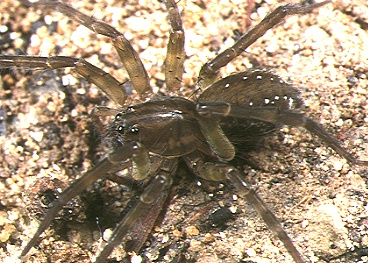
female P. clercki from Okinawa

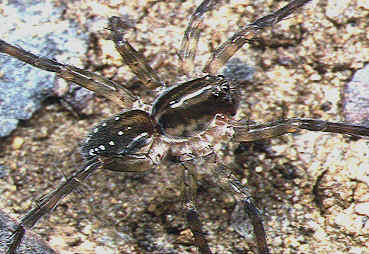
male P. clercki from Okinawa

As of 2022, the following species are recognised in the genus Piratula:

- Piratula borea (Tanaka, 1974) — Russia, China, Japan
- Piratula canadensis (Dondale & Redner, 1981) — Russia, Canada
- Piratula cantralli (Wallace & Exline, 1978) — USA, Canada
- Piratula clercki (Bösenberg & Strand, 1906) — China, Korea, Taiwan, Japan
- Piratula denticulata (Liu, 1987) — Russia, China, Taiwan
- Piratula gigantea (Gertsch, 1934) — USA
- Piratula hiroshii (Tanaka, 1986) — Japan
- Piratula hokkaidensis (Tanaka, 2003) — Japan
- Piratula hurkai (Buchar, 1966) — Ukraine, Russia, Georgia, Abkhazia
- Piratula hygrophila (Thorell, 1872) — Palearctic
- Piratula insularis (Emerton, 1885) — Holarctic
- Piratula iriomotensis (Tanaka, 1989) — Ryukyu Islands
- Piratula knorri (Scopoli, 1763) — Palearctic
- Piratula latitans (Blackwall, 1841) — Europe to Azerbaijan
- Piratula logunovi Omelko, Marusik & Koponen, 2011 — Russia
- Piratula longjiangensis (Yan et al., 1997) — China
- Piratula meridionalis (Tanaka, 1974) — China, Korea, Japan
- Piratula minuta (Emerton, 1885) — North America
- Piratula montigena (Liu, 1987) — China
- Piratula piratoides (Bösenberg & Strand, 1906) — Russia, Korea, China, Japan
- Piratula procurva (Bösenberg & Strand, 1906) — China, Korea, Japan
- Piratula raika Zamani & Marusik, 2021 — Iran
- Piratula serrulata (Song & Wang, 1984) — Russia, China
- Piratula tanakai (Brignoli, 1983) — Russia, Korea, Japan
- Piratula tenuisetacea (Chai, 1987) — China
- Piratula uliginosa (Thorell, 1856) — Europe, Russia (Europe to West Siberia)
- Piratula yaginumai (Tanaka, 1974) — Russia, China, Korea, Japan
- Piratula yesoensis (Tanaka, 1985) — Japan

== See also ==
- List of Lycosidae genera
