= Piratula hurkai =

Scientific classification
- Kingdom: Animalia
- Phylum: Arthropoda
- Subphylum: Chelicerata
- Class: Arachnida
- Order: Araneae
- Infraorder: Araneomorphae
- Family: Lycosidae
- Genus: Piratula
- Species: P. hurkai

Binomial name
- Piratula hurkai (Buchar, 1966)

Species of spider

Piratula hurkai is a wolf spider species found in Ukraine, Russia, Georgia and Abkhazia.
