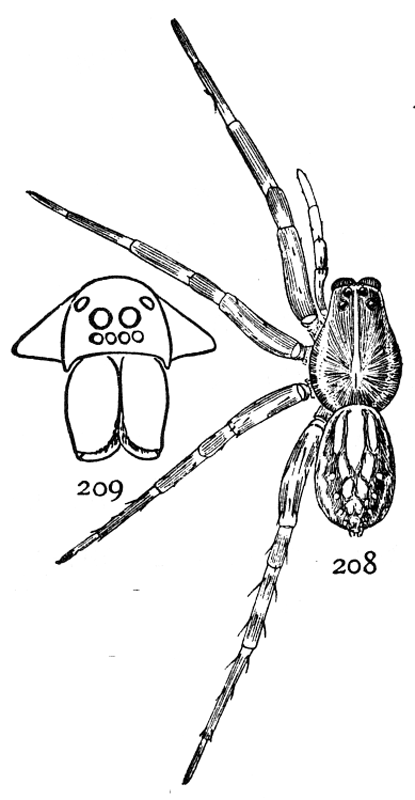
- Trebacosa marxi

Scientific classification
- Kingdom: Animalia
- Phylum: Arthropoda
- Subphylum: Chelicerata
- Class: Arachnida
- Order: Araneae
- Infraorder: Araneomorphae
- Family: Lycosidae
- Genus: Trebacosa; Dondale & Redner, 1981

Species
- See text

= Trebacosa =

Genus of spiders

Trebacosa is a genus of wolf spiders first described by Dondale & Redner in 1981.

== Species ==
As of February 2019 it contains only two species:

- Trebacosa europaea Szinetar & Kancsal, 2007 — Hungary
- Trebacosa marxi (Stone, 1890) — USA, Canada
