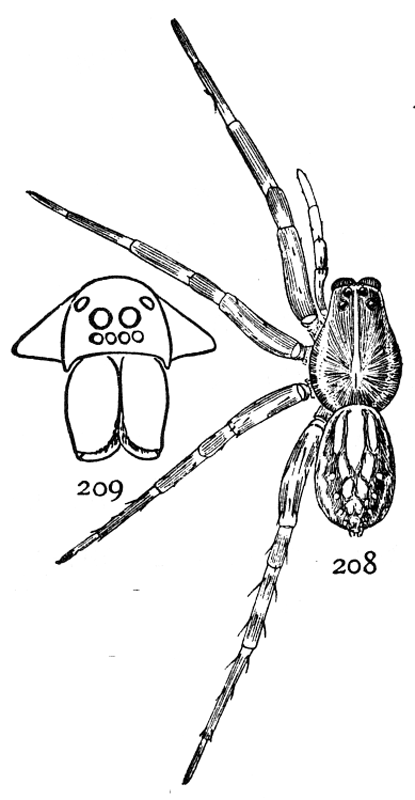

Scientific classification
- Kingdom: Animalia
- Phylum: Arthropoda
- Subphylum: Chelicerata
- Class: Arachnida
- Order: Araneae
- Infraorder: Araneomorphae
- Family: Lycosidae
- Genus: Trebacosa
- Species: T. marxi

Binomial name
- Trebacosa marxi (Stone, 1890)

= Trebacosa marxi =

Species of spider

Trebacosa marxi is a species of wolf spider in the family Lycosidae. It is found in the United States and Canada.
