= Trebacosa europaea =

Scientific classification
- Kingdom: Animalia
- Phylum: Arthropoda
- Subphylum: Chelicerata
- Class: Arachnida
- Order: Araneae
- Infraorder: Araneomorphae
- Family: Lycosidae
- Genus: Trebacosa
- Species: T. europaea

Binomial name
- Trebacosa europaea Szinetár & Kancsal, 2007

Synonyms
- Trebacosa brunhesi Villepoux, 2007

Species of spider

Trebacosa europaea is a wolf spider species in the genus Trebacosa found in France, Hungary, Belarus and Greece.
