= Passiena auberti =

Passiena banded wolf spider

Scientific classification
- Kingdom: Animalia
- Phylum: Arthropoda
- Subphylum: Chelicerata
- Class: Arachnida
- Order: Araneae
- Infraorder: Araneomorphae
- Family: Lycosidae
- Genus: Passiena
- Species: P. auberti

Binomial name
- Passiena auberti (Simon, 1898)

Synonyms
- Pardosa auberti Simon, 1898

Species of spider

Passiena auberti is a species of spider in the family Lycosidae. It is endemic to South Africa and is commonly known as the Passiena banded wolf spider.

== Distribution ==
Passiena auberti is found in South Africa, where it is known from the provinces Gauteng and Limpopo. The species was originally described from Makapan and has also been recorded from Pretoria North.

== Habitat and ecology ==
Passiena auberti is a fast running ground spider sampled from the Savanna biome at 1,599 m above sea level.

== Conservation ==
Passiena auberti is listed as Data Deficient for Taxonomic reasons by the South African National Biodiversity Institute. The species is known only from females, and additional sampling is needed to collect males and determine the full range of the species.

== Taxonomy ==
Passiena auberti was originally described by Eugène Simon in 1898 as Pardosa auberti from Makapan in Limpopo. The species was reviewed by Roewer in 1959 and is known only from females. According to Lehtinen in 2005, the species is misplaced in the genus Passiena and its taxonomic status remains uncertain pending revisional studies of the main African groups of wolf spiders.
