= Passiena =

Scientific classification
- Kingdom: Animalia
- Phylum: Arthropoda
- Subphylum: Chelicerata
- Class: Arachnida
- Order: Araneae
- Infraorder: Araneomorphae
- Family: Lycosidae
- Genus: Passiena; Thorell

Species
- 6, see text

Genus of spiders

Passiena is a genus of spiders in the family Lycosidae with six described species from Africa and Asia. It was first described in 1890 by Thorell.

== Lifestyle ==
Members of Passiena are free-running ground spiders.

== Description ==
Passiena contains small to medium spiders.

The colour pattern of both carapace and abdomen features a wide, light longitudinal median band. The fovea on the carapace is very distinct and dark in colour. The anterior eye row is slightly procurved, with anterior median eyes and anterior lateral eyes subequal in size. The posterior median eye row is narrower than that of posterior lateral eyes, as in most wolf spiders. The abdomen of males ventrally bears short modified setae which carry secondary hair-like structures.

The femora have oblique or irregular annulations in females, while males show a different colour pattern on femora I. Distal segments of legs are uniform in colour, sometimes with a pattern on tibiae I. Tibiae of legs I and II have 4–6 pairs of ventral spines, and metatarsi of legs I–II usually have 4 exceptionally long pairs of ventral spines. Dorsal and lateral spines are conspicuous in all legs, relatively shorter in males than females. Leg spination of males is weaker than that in females.

== Taxonomy ==
In a review by Pekka Lehtinen in 2005, he found that three of the African species were incorrectly placed in Passiena and transferred them to Pardosa. He found that the remaining two species might be incertae sedis pending revisional studies of the main African groups of wolf spiders. Passiena auberti and Passiena albipalpis are possibly incertae sedis pending a generic revision of African Lycosidae as they cannot be placed with certainty into any other lycosid genus.

== Species ==
As of October 2025, this genus includes six species:

- Passiena albipalpis Roewer, 1959 – Cameroon
- Passiena auberti (Simon, 1898) – South Africa
- Passiena bayi Omelko & Marusik, 2020 – Laos
- Passiena duani Tan, Irfan, Zhang & Wang, 2023 – China
- Passiena spinicrus Thorell, 1890 – Malaysia (Peninsula, Borneo), Indonesia (Borneo) (type species)
- Passiena torbjoerni Lehtinen, 2005 – Thailand
