= Zoica parvula =

Scientific classification
- Kingdom: Animalia
- Phylum: Arthropoda
- Subphylum: Chelicerata
- Class: Arachnida
- Order: Araneae
- Infraorder: Araneomorphae
- Family: Lycosidae
- Genus: Zoica
- Species: Z. parvula

Binomial name
- Zoica parvula (Thorell, 1895)

Species of spider

Zoica parvula, is a species of spider of the genus Zoica. It is native to Myanmar, Malaysia, Sri Lanka and Thailand.
