= Zoica puellula =

Scientific classification
- Kingdom: Animalia
- Phylum: Arthropoda
- Subphylum: Chelicerata
- Class: Arachnida
- Order: Araneae
- Infraorder: Araneomorphae
- Family: Lycosidae
- Genus: Zoica
- Species: Z. puellula

Binomial name
- Zoica puellula (Simon, 1898)

Species of spider

Zoica puellula, is a species of spider of the genus Zoica. It is native to India, and Sri Lanka.
