= Zoica =

Scientific classification
- Kingdom: Animalia
- Phylum: Arthropoda
- Subphylum: Chelicerata
- Class: Arachnida
- Order: Araneae
- Infraorder: Araneomorphae
- Family: Lycosidae
- Genus: Zoica; Simon, 1898

Type species
- Zoica parvula (Thorell, 1895)

Species
- See text

Diversity
- 12 species

Genus of spiders

Zoica is a genus of wolf spiders in the family Lycosidae, containing twelve species.

== Species ==
- Zoica bambusicola Lehtinen & Hippa, 1979 — Thailand
- Zoica bolubolu Lehtinen & Hippa, 1979 — New Guinea
- Zoica carolinensis Framenau, Berry & Beatty, 2009 — Caroline Islands
- Zoica falcata Lehtinen & Hippa, 1979 — Borneo, New Guinea
- Zoica harduarae (Biswas & Roy, 2008) — India
- Zoica minuta (McKay, 1979) — Western Australia
- Zoica oculata Buchar, 1997 — Bhutan
- Zoica pacifica Framenau, Berry & Beatty, 2009 — Marshall Islands
- Zoica parvula (Thorell, 1895) — Sri Lanka, Myanmar, Thailand, Malaysia
- Zoica puellula (Simon, 1898) — India, Sri Lanka
- Zoica unciformis Li, Wang & Zhang, 2013 — China
- Zoica wauensis Lehtinen & Hippa, 1979 — New Guinea
