= Loculla =

Scientific classification
- Kingdom: Animalia
- Phylum: Arthropoda
- Subphylum: Chelicerata
- Class: Arachnida
- Order: Araneae
- Infraorder: Araneomorphae
- Family: Lycosidae
- Genus: Loculla; Simon

Species
- Loculla austrocaspia Roewer, 1955; Loculla massaica Roewer, 1960; Loculla rauca Simon, 1910; Loculla rauca minor Simon, 1910; Loculla senzea Roewer, 1960

Genus of spiders

Loculla is a genus of spiders in the family Lycosidae. It was first described in 1910 by Simon. As of 2017, it contains 5 species.
