= Loculla rauca =

Scientific classification
- Kingdom: Animalia
- Phylum: Arthropoda
- Subphylum: Chelicerata
- Class: Arachnida
- Order: Araneae
- Infraorder: Araneomorphae
- Family: Lycosidae
- Genus: Loculla
- Species: L. rauca

Binomial name
- Loculla rauca Simon, 1910

Species of spider

Loculla rauca is a wolf spider species of the family Lycosidae endemic to São Tomé Island. It was first described in 1910 by Eugène Simon.

Its female holotype measures 16 mm. The subspecies Loculla rauca minor only measures 8-10 mm.
