= Camptocosa =

Scientific classification
- Kingdom: Animalia
- Phylum: Arthropoda
- Subphylum: Chelicerata
- Class: Arachnida
- Order: Araneae
- Infraorder: Araneomorphae
- Family: Lycosidae
- Genus: Camptocosa; Nieto

Type species
- Pardosa parallela Banks 1898

Species
- Camptocosa parallela (Banks, 1898) - U.S.; Camptocosa texana Dondale, Jiménez & Nieto, 2005 - U.S., Mexico

Genus of spiders

Camptocosa is a genus of spiders in the family Lycosidae. It was first described in 2005 by Dondale, Jiménez & Nieto. As of 2017, it contains 2 species.
