= Camptocosa parallela =

Scientific classification
- Kingdom: Animalia
- Phylum: Arthropoda
- Subphylum: Chelicerata
- Class: Arachnida
- Order: Araneae
- Infraorder: Araneomorphae
- Family: Lycosidae
- Genus: Camptocosa
- Species: C. parallela

Binomial name
- Camptocosa parallela (Banks, 1898)

Species of spider

Camptocosa parallela is a species of wolf spider in the family Lycosidae. It is found in the United States and Mexico.
