= Melocosa =

Scientific classification
- Domain: Eukaryota
- Kingdom: Animalia
- Phylum: Arthropoda
- Subphylum: Chelicerata
- Class: Arachnida
- Order: Araneae
- Infraorder: Araneomorphae
- Family: Lycosidae
- Genus: Melocosa; Gertsch

Species
- Melocosa fumosa (Emerton, 1894); Melocosa gertschi Mello-Leitão, 1947

Genus of spiders

Melocosa is a genus of spiders in the family Lycosidae. It was first described in 1937 by Gertsch. As of 2017, it contains 2 species.
