= Melocosa fumosa =

Scientific classification
- Kingdom: Animalia
- Phylum: Arthropoda
- Subphylum: Chelicerata
- Class: Arachnida
- Order: Araneae
- Infraorder: Araneomorphae
- Family: Lycosidae
- Genus: Melocosa
- Species: M. fumosa

Binomial name
- Melocosa fumosa (Emerton, 1894)

Species of spider

Melocosa fumosa is a species of wolf spider in the family Lycosidae. It is found in the United States and Canada.
