= Hogna coloradensis =

Scientific classification
- Kingdom: Animalia
- Phylum: Arthropoda
- Subphylum: Chelicerata
- Class: Arachnida
- Order: Araneae
- Infraorder: Araneomorphae
- Family: Lycosidae
- Genus: Hogna
- Species: H. coloradensis

Binomial name
- Hogna coloradensis (Banks, 1894)

Species of spider

Hogna coloradensis is a species of wolf spider in the family Lycosidae. It is found in the United States and Mexico.
