= Hogna arborea =

Scientific classification
- Kingdom: Animalia
- Phylum: Arthropoda
- Subphylum: Chelicerata
- Class: Arachnida
- Order: Araneae
- Infraorder: Araneomorphae
- Family: Lycosidae
- Genus: Hogna
- Species: H. arborea

Binomial name
- Hogna arborea (Y.Y. Lo, 2023)

Species of spider

Hogna arborea is a species of wolf spider in the family Lycosidae. It is also known as the Taiwanese tree-dwelling wolf spider.

== See also ==
- Taiwan Biodiversity Research Institute
