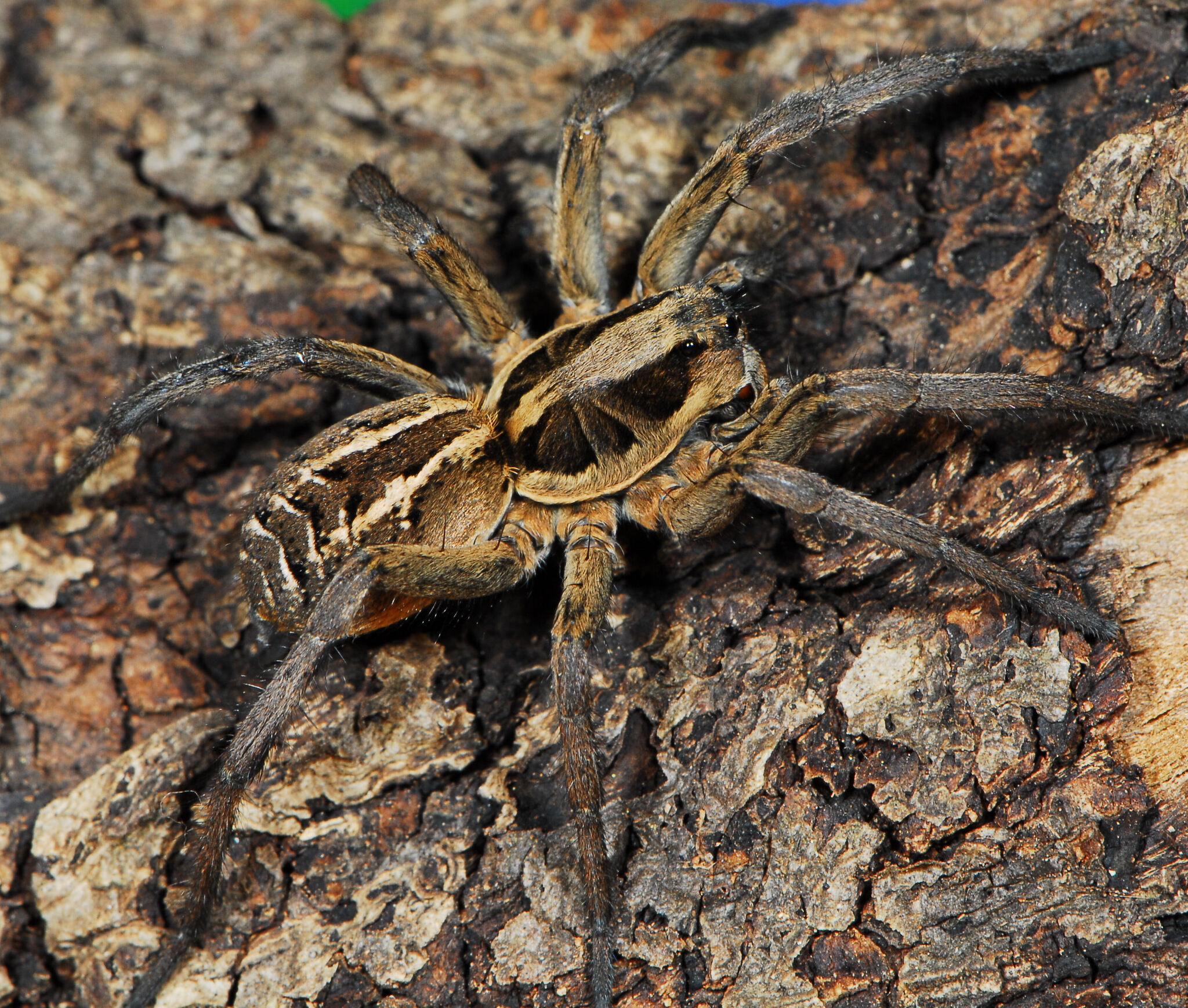
- female
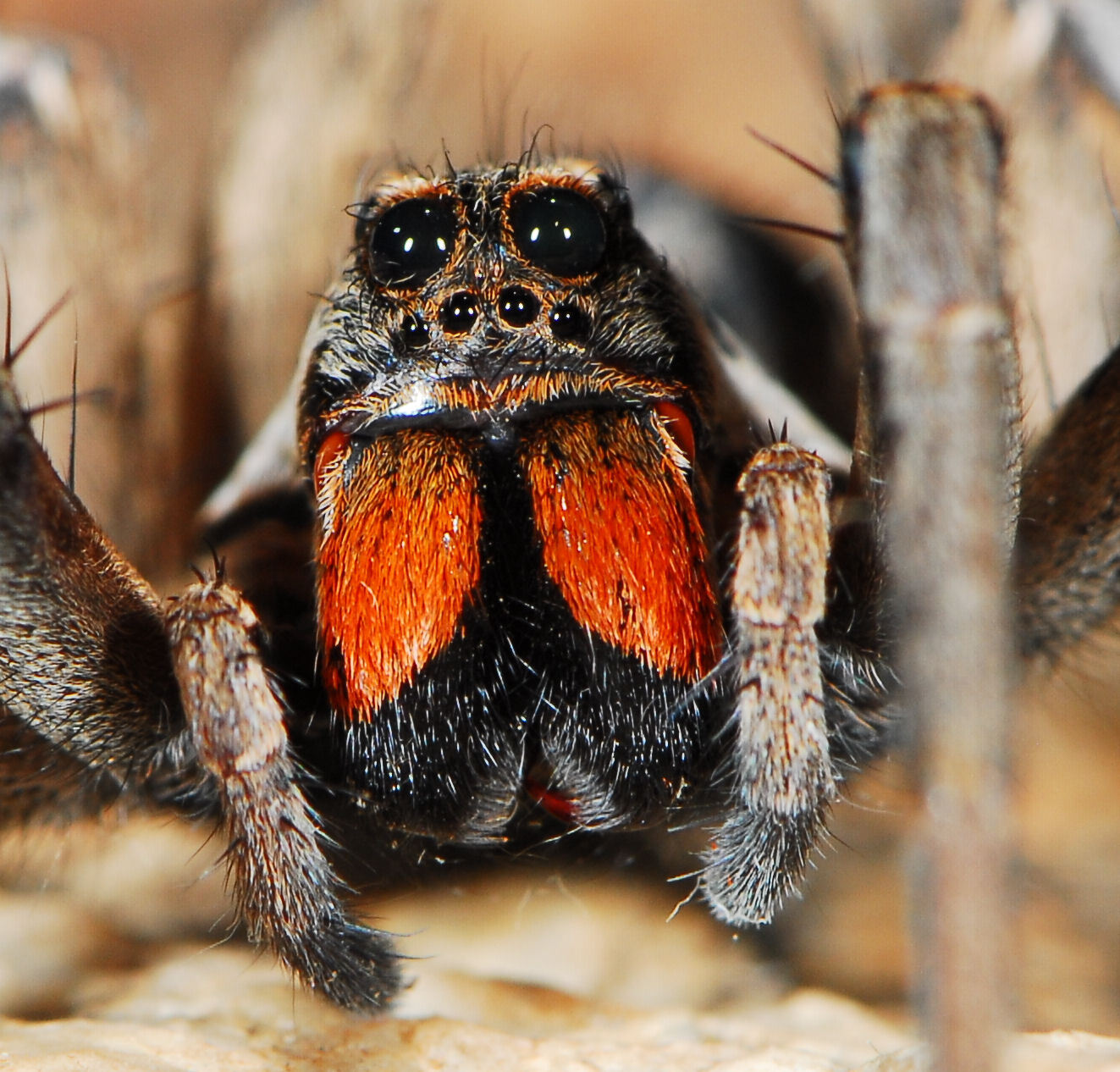
- female

Scientific classification
- Kingdom: Animalia
- Phylum: Arthropoda
- Subphylum: Chelicerata
- Class: Arachnida
- Order: Araneae
- Infraorder: Araneomorphae
- Family: Lycosidae
- Genus: Hogna
- Species: H. transvaalica

Binomial name
- Hogna transvaalica (Simon, 1898)

Synonyms
- Lycosa transvaalica Simon, 1898

= Hogna transvaalica =

Six-spotted burrow-living wolf spider

Species of spider

Hogna transvaalica is a species of spider in the family Lycosidae. It is found in southern Africa and is commonly known as the six-spotted burrow-living wolf spider.

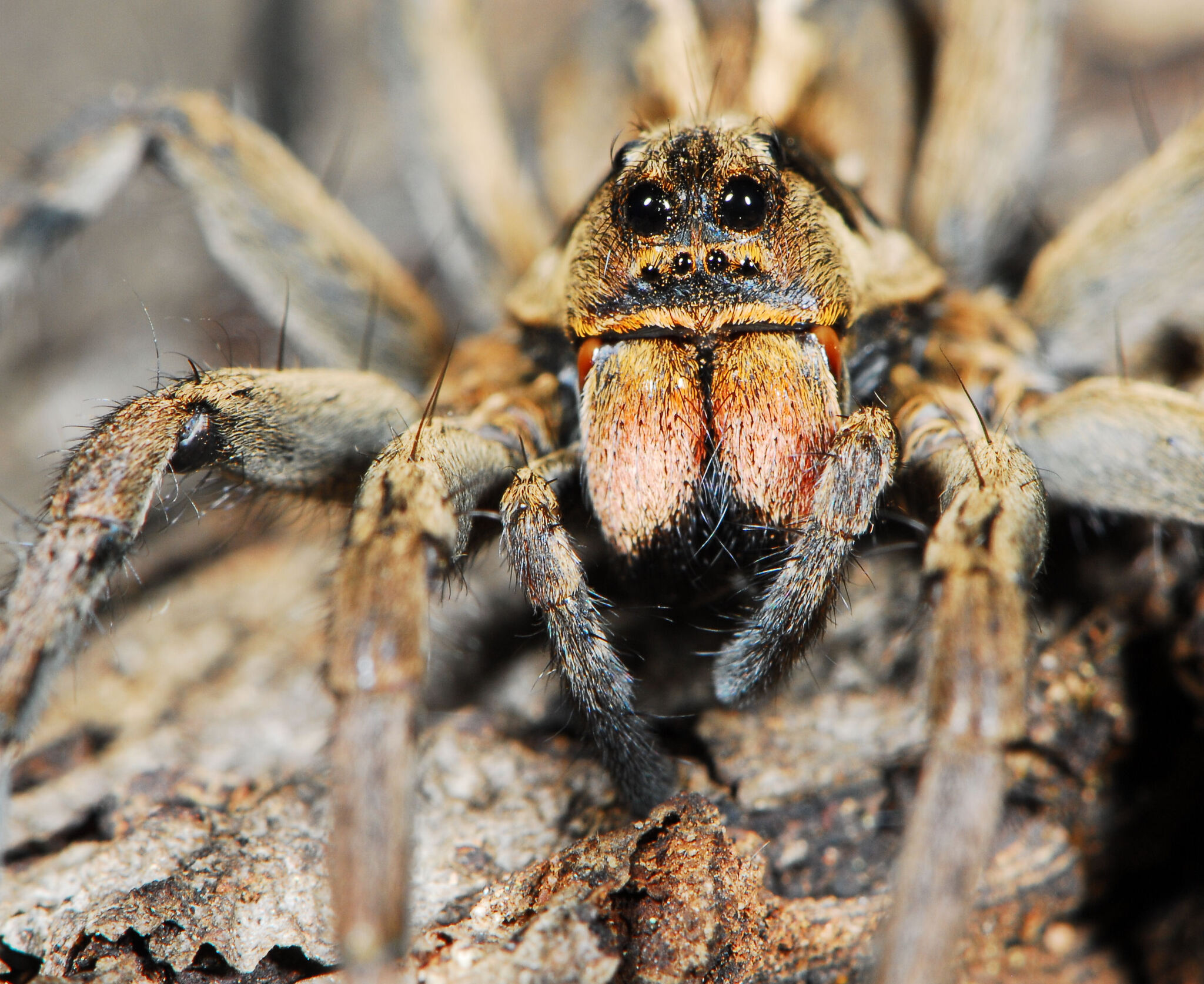
female

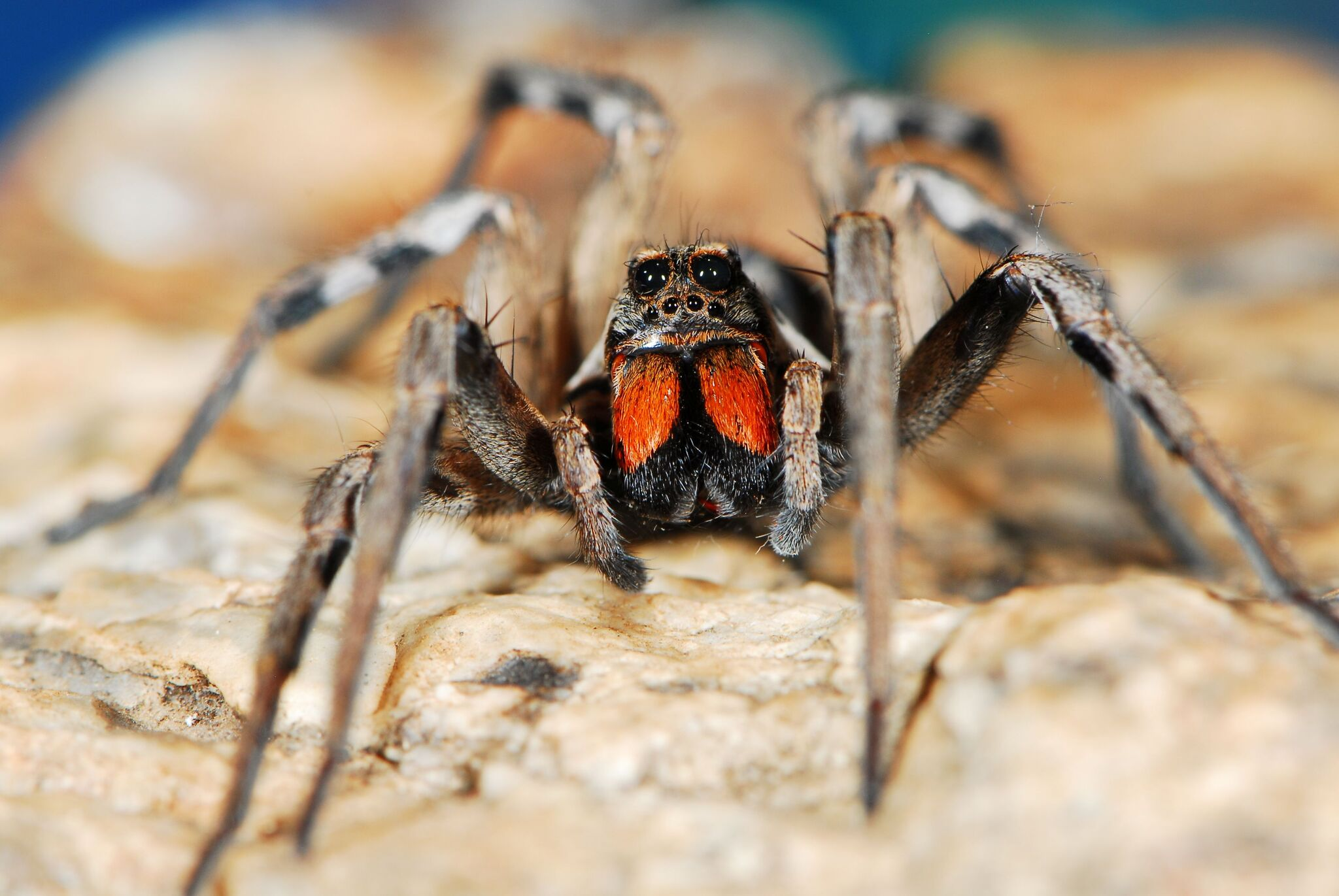
female

== Distribution ==
Hogna transvaalica is found in Botswana and South Africa.

In South Africa, it is known from Eastern Cape, Free State, Gauteng, Limpopo, Mpumalanga, and the Northern Cape.

== Habitat and ecology ==
This species is a free-living ground dweller that lives in burrows that are open and not closed with a trapdoor.

It has been sampled from the Grassland and Savanna biomes at altitudes ranging from 275 to 1762 m.

== Description ==
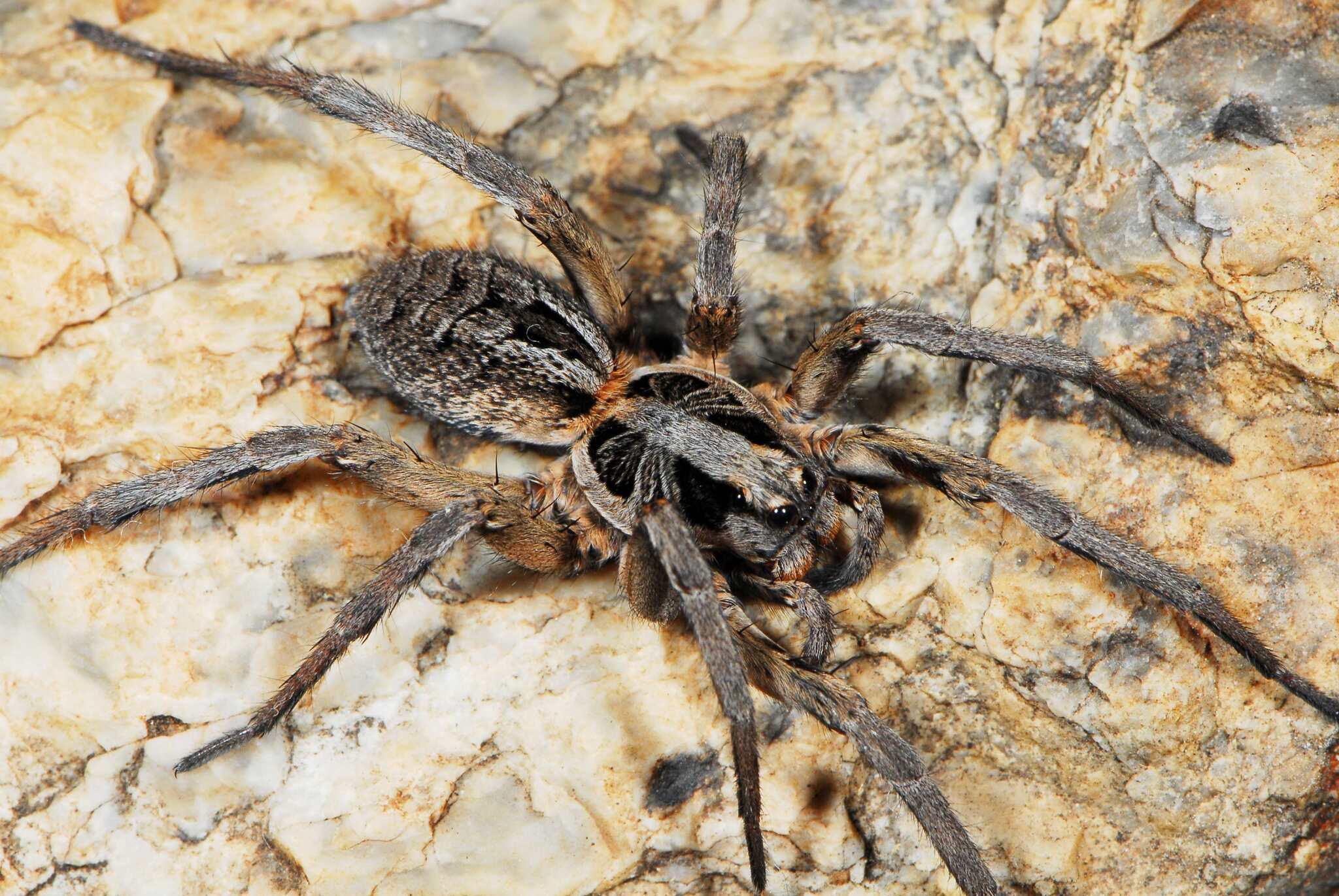
female

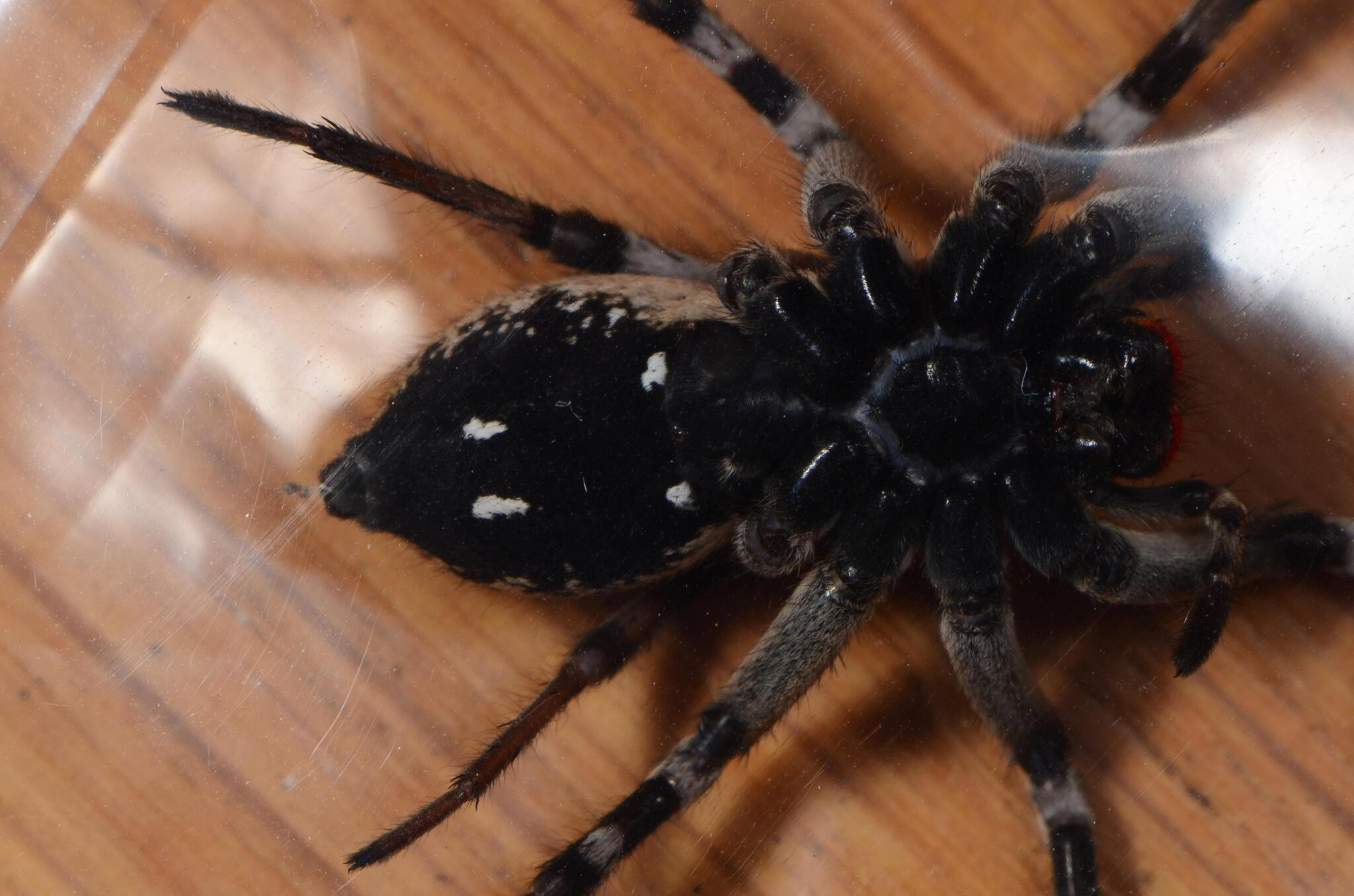
ventral view of female

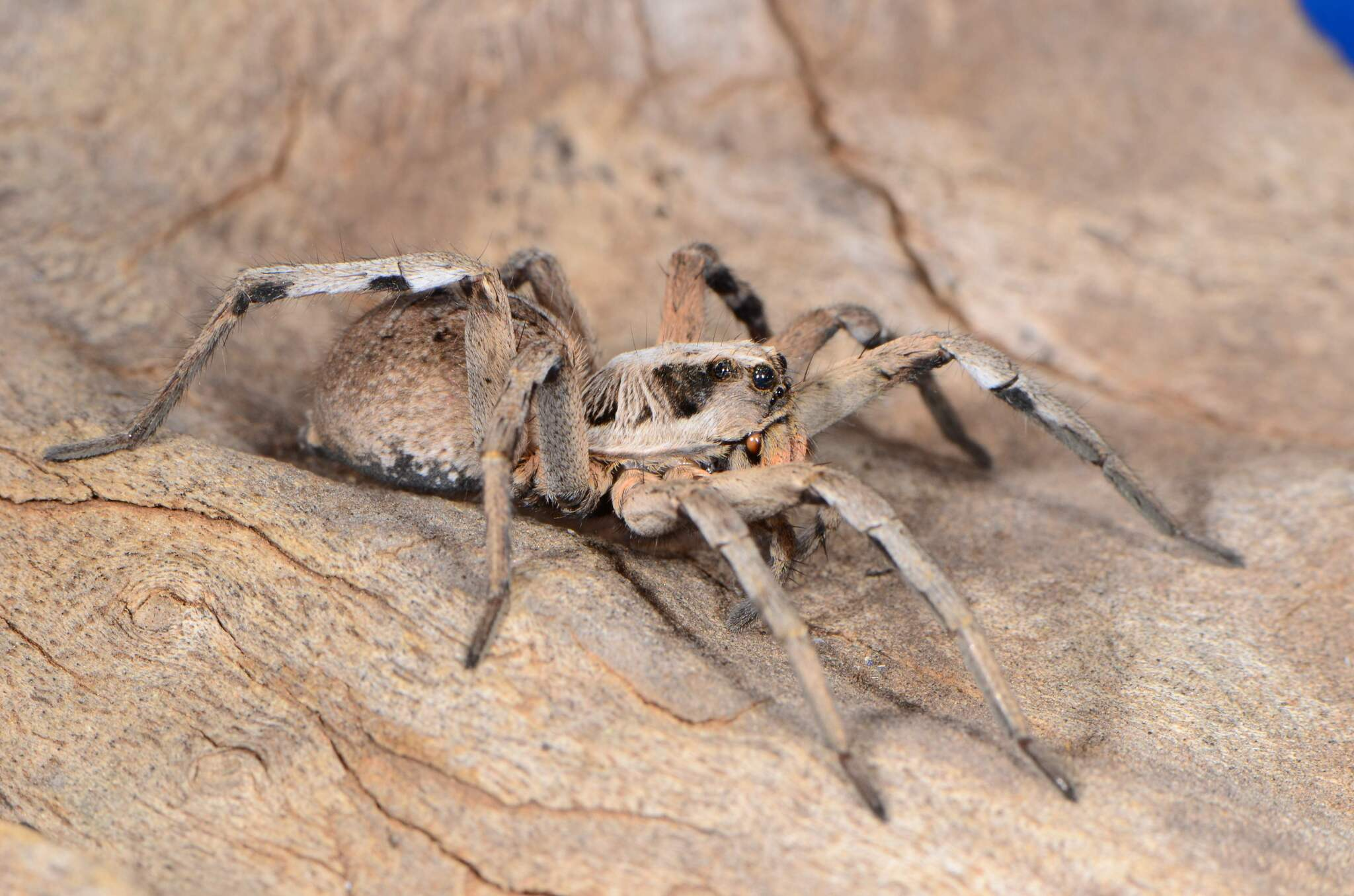
female

Known from both sexes, Hogna transvaalica is characterized by having three pairs of white spots on the ventral abdomen.

== Conservation ==
The species has a large geographic range and is protected in 12 protected areas.

== Etymology ==
Hogna transvaalica is named after the Transvaal, a former province of South Africa where specimens were collected.

== Taxonomy ==
Hogna transvaalica was originally described by Simon in 1898 as Lycosa transvaalica with the type locality given as "Africa australis Bechuanaland, Griqualand W., Transvaal". It was later revised by Roewer in 1960.
