= Hogna thetis =

Scientific classification
- Kingdom: Animalia
- Phylum: Arthropoda
- Subphylum: Chelicerata
- Class: Arachnida
- Order: Araneae
- Infraorder: Araneomorphae
- Family: Lycosidae
- Genus: Hogna
- Species: H. thetis

Binomial name
- Hogna thetis (Simon, 1910)

Synonyms
- Lycosa thetis Simon, 1910

Species of spider

Hogna thetis is an endemic spider species of the family Lycosidae that lives on Príncipe in São Tomé and Príncipe. It was first described as Lycosa thetis in 1907 by Eugène Simon.

Its female holotype measures 13 mm (0.51 in).
