= Hogna idonea =

East London burrow-living wolf spider

Scientific classification
- Kingdom: Animalia
- Phylum: Arthropoda
- Subphylum: Chelicerata
- Class: Arachnida
- Order: Araneae
- Infraorder: Araneomorphae
- Family: Lycosidae
- Genus: Hogna
- Species: H. idonea

Binomial name
- Hogna idonea Roewer, 1959

Species of spider

Hogna idonea is a species of spider in the family Lycosidae. It is endemic to South Africa and is commonly known as the East London burrow-living wolf spider.

== Distribution ==
Hogna idonea is found only in East London in the Eastern Cape province of South Africa.

== Habitat and ecology ==
This species is a free-living ground dweller that lives in open burrows. It has been sampled from the Thicket biome at an altitude of 56 m.

== Description ==
Hogna idonea is known only from males.

The cephalothorax is brown with a black eye field and a median band as well as wide, medially wavy bordered marginal bands. These three bands protrude sharply, are pale yellow, and are densely haired with white hair.

The abdomen is dorsally black-brown, with the entire broad middle field white-yellow and sharply delimited at the sides. At the median in front, it shows a reddish-yellow, black narrowly marked lancet band followed by five to six black median markings. Ventrally, the epigaster is pale yellow, but behind this is a square median spot. The sternum and coxae are uniformly rusty yellow, as are other leg segments.

== Conservation ==
The species is known only from the type locality with a limited range. Additional sampling is needed to collect females and determine the full geographic range.
