= Hogna bimaculata =

Two-spotted burrow-living wolf spider

Scientific classification
- Kingdom: Animalia
- Phylum: Arthropoda
- Subphylum: Chelicerata
- Class: Arachnida
- Order: Araneae
- Infraorder: Araneomorphae
- Family: Lycosidae
- Genus: Hogna
- Species: H. bimaculata

Binomial name
- Hogna bimaculata (Purcell, 1903)

Synonyms
- Lycosa bimaculata Purcell, 1903

Species of spider

Hogna bimaculata is a species of spider in the family Lycosidae. It is found in southern Africa and is commonly known as the two-spotted burrow-living wolf spider.

== Distribution ==
Hogna bimaculata is found in Botswana, Namibia, and South Africa.

In South Africa, it is recorded from Eastern Cape, Free State, Gauteng, Limpopo, and Western Cape.

== Habitat and ecology ==
This species is a free-living ground dweller that lives in open burrows.

It has been sampled from the Fynbos, Savanna, and Thicket biomes at altitudes ranging from 60 to 1730 m.

== Description ==
Hogna bimaculata is known only from females.

The cephalothorax has brown, whitish and yellowish intermingled hairs, with a yellowish median band

The abdomen is dorsally blackish, on the front half with a spindle-shaped, brownish median band, which is slightly blackish-edged and each side is accompanied by a pale, broad streak which unites with the opposite side in front of the median band; ventrally black, sometimes behind with a pair of white hair spots.

== Conservation ==
The species has a large geographic range and is protected in six protected areas. There are no significant threats to the species.

== Taxonomy ==
The species was originally described by Purcell in 1903 as Lycosa bimaculata from East London, South Africa. It was later revised by Roewer in 1959.
