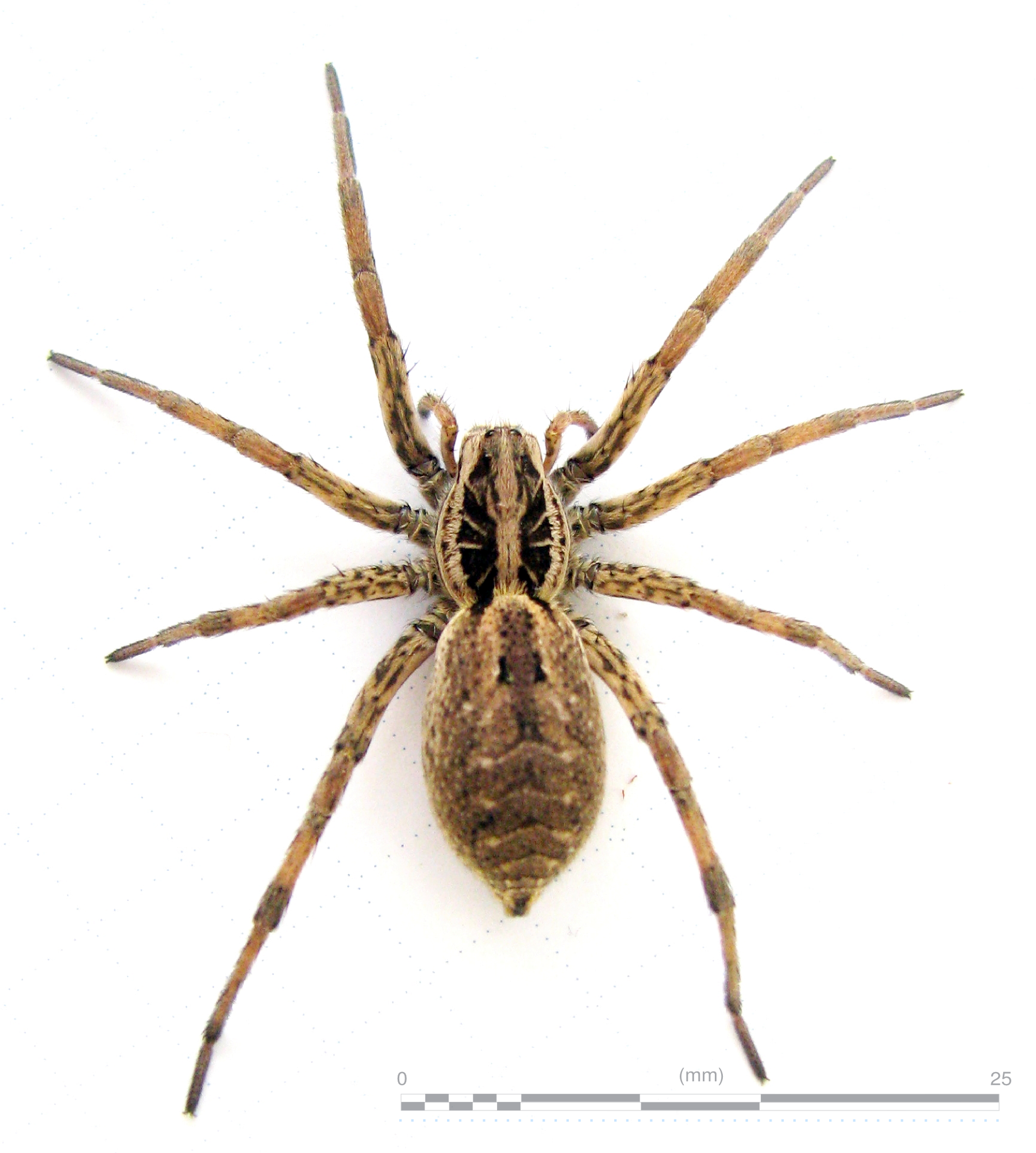
- Hogna radiata
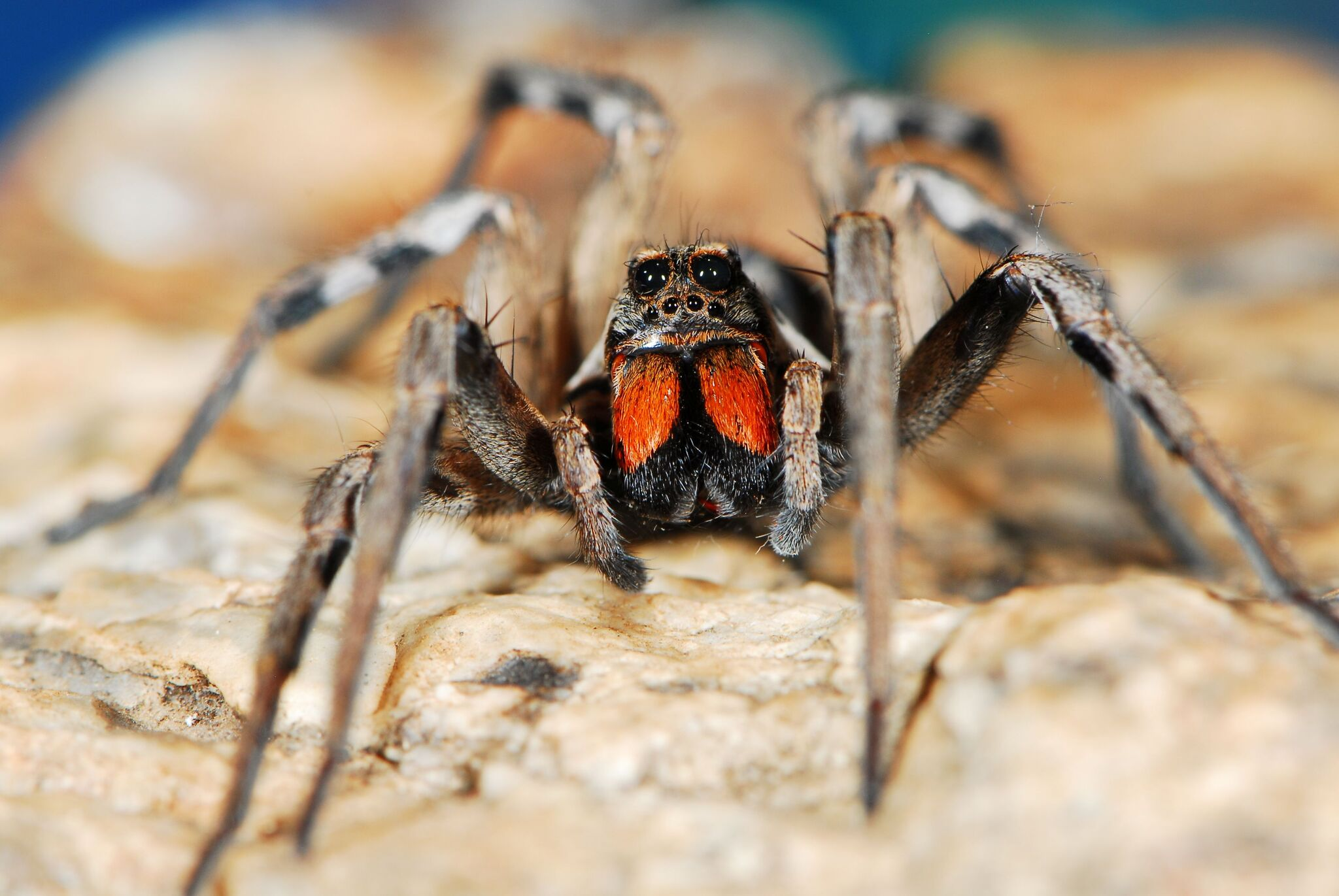
- female H. transvaalica

Scientific classification
- Kingdom: Animalia
- Phylum: Arthropoda
- Subphylum: Chelicerata
- Class: Arachnida
- Order: Araneae
- Infraorder: Araneomorphae
- Family: Lycosidae
- Genus: Hogna; Simon, 1885

Type species
- Hogna radiata (Latreille, 1817)

Species
- 230, see text

Synonyms
- Citilycosa Roewer, 1960; Galapagosa Roewer, 1960; Isohogna Roewer, 1960; Lycorma Simon, 1885; Lynxosa Roewer, 1960; Trochosula Roewer, 1960

= Hogna =

Genus of spiders

Hogna is a genus of wolf spiders with more than 200 described species. It is found on all continents except Antarctica.

== Lifestyle ==
They live in burrows that are open and not closed with a trapdoor.

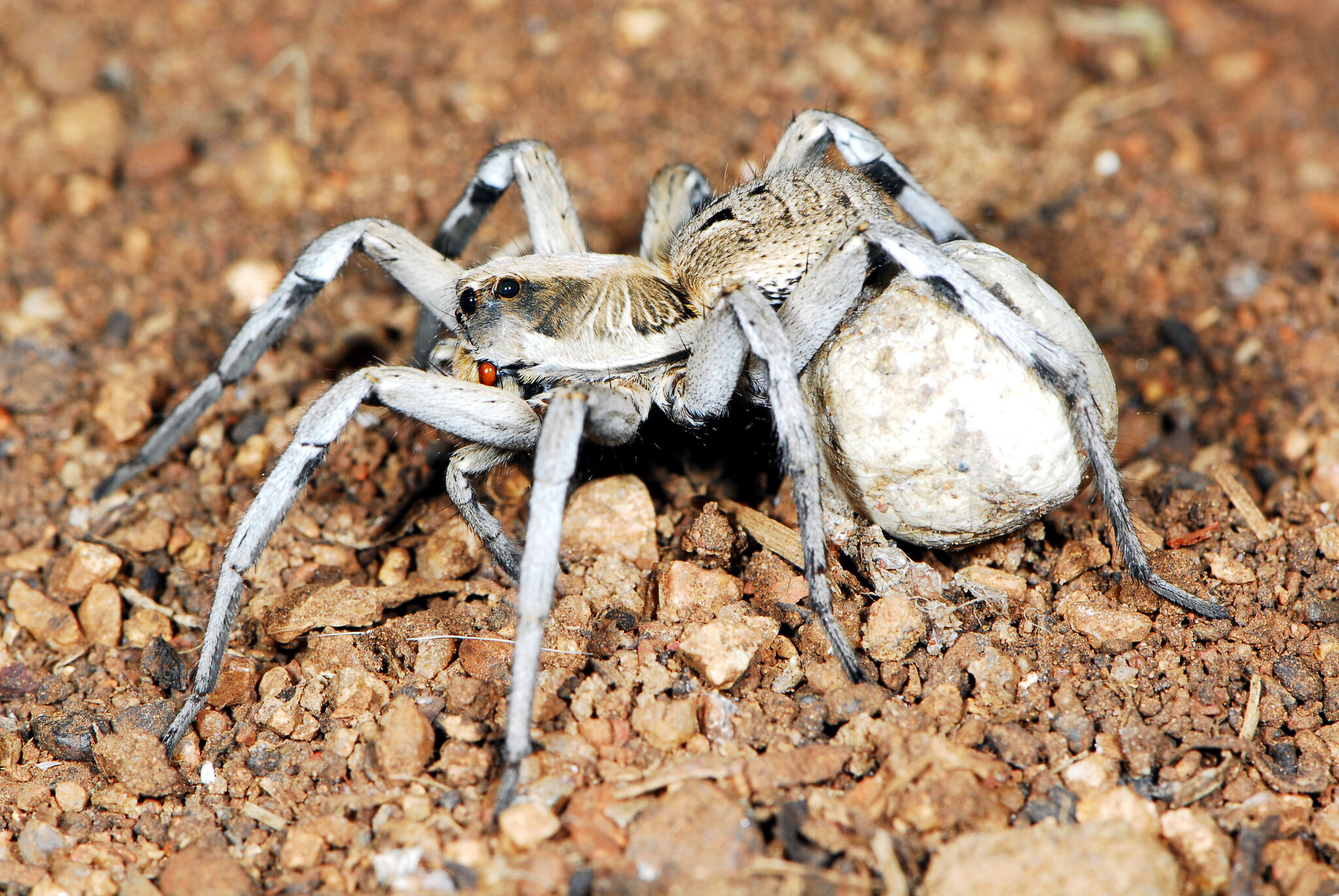
female H. spenceri with egg sac

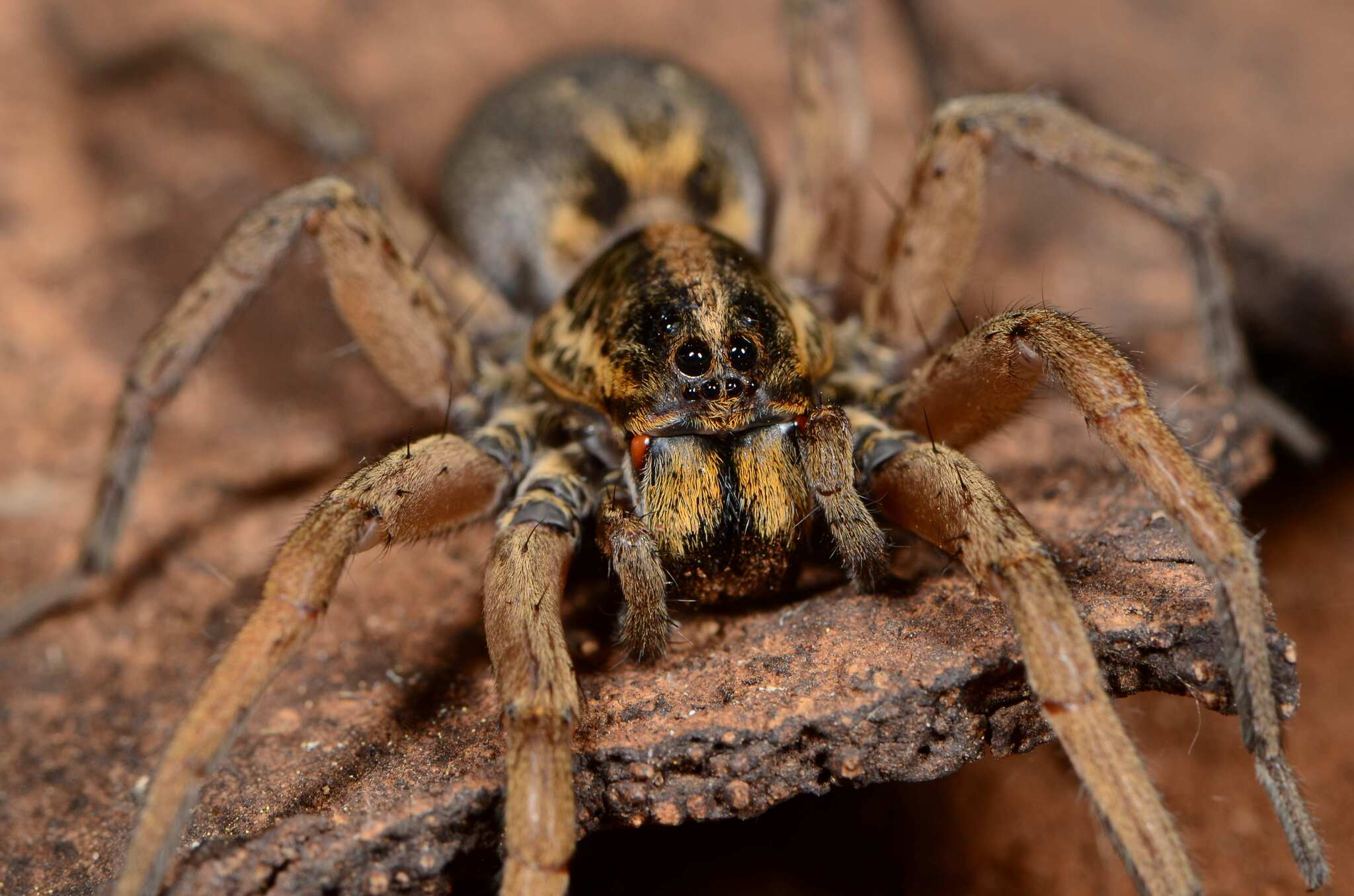
female H. spenceri

== Description ==
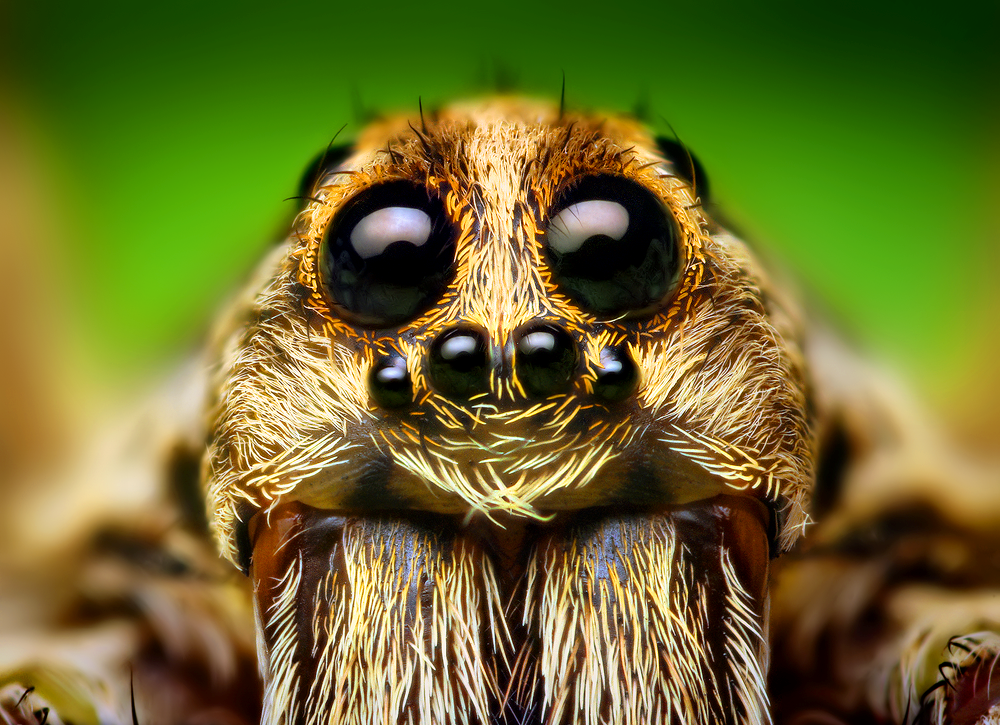
The typical eye pattern of Hogna species: the width of the bottom row of eyes is less than the width of the two largest eyes in the middle row.

The genus has never been properly revised, even in Europe, and a reliable diagnosis is lacking.

The genitalia are very conservative and closely resemble those of many other lycosine genera, making diagnosis on genitalic characters alone difficult. Characters that may be significant include the form of the female epigyne with a very long, relatively narrow longitudinal bar of the central T-shaped structure, the dorsal color pattern with the central longitudinal pale stripe of the prosoma extending the full length as far as the posterior median eyes, the abdominal pattern with a central lanceolate mark flanked by two darker longitudinal stripes, and the dense ventral scopulae present on tarsi and metatarsi of all legs.

However, the African fauna includes specimens that differ somewhat from this in either genitalic or somatic characters, some appearing intermediate between Hogna and Trochosa.

Hogna carolinensis is among the largest spiders found in the United States; females may have a body length of from 22 mm (0.87 in) to 35 mm (1.4 in). The carapace of H. carolinensis is characterized by an overall dark brown coloration, usually without any patterned variations. Its abdomen has a slightly darker stripe down its center, and its ventral side is black. This spider typically dwells in a vertical tube dug into the ground that may reach as deep as eight inches.

== Taxonomy ==
The genus is in need of revision.

== Etymology ==
The word Hogna might be a rough latinization of one of the Greek words ὄχνη (ókhnē) "pear" or ὄγχνη (ónkhnē) "pear-tree".

== Species ==
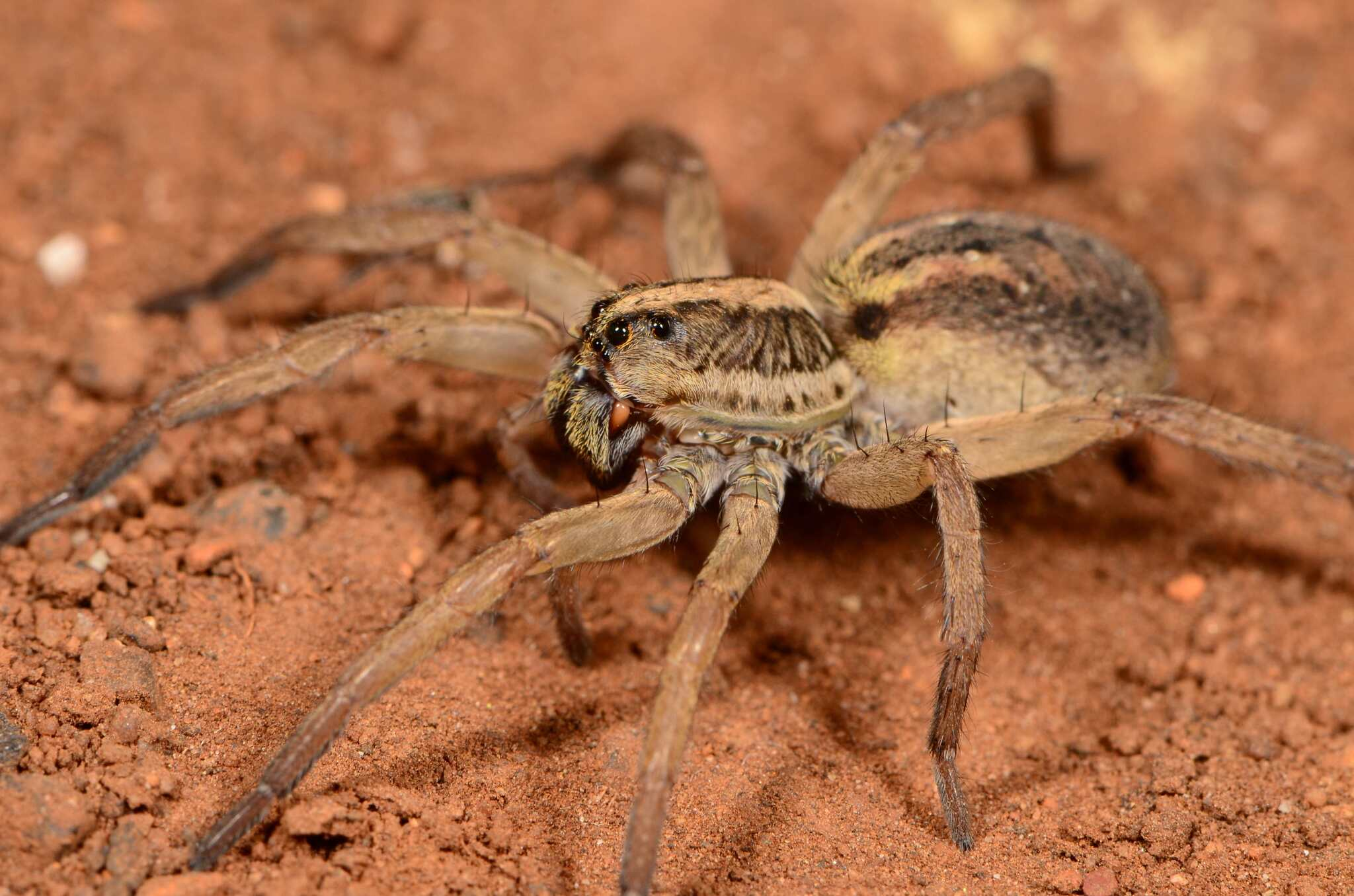
female H. lawrencei

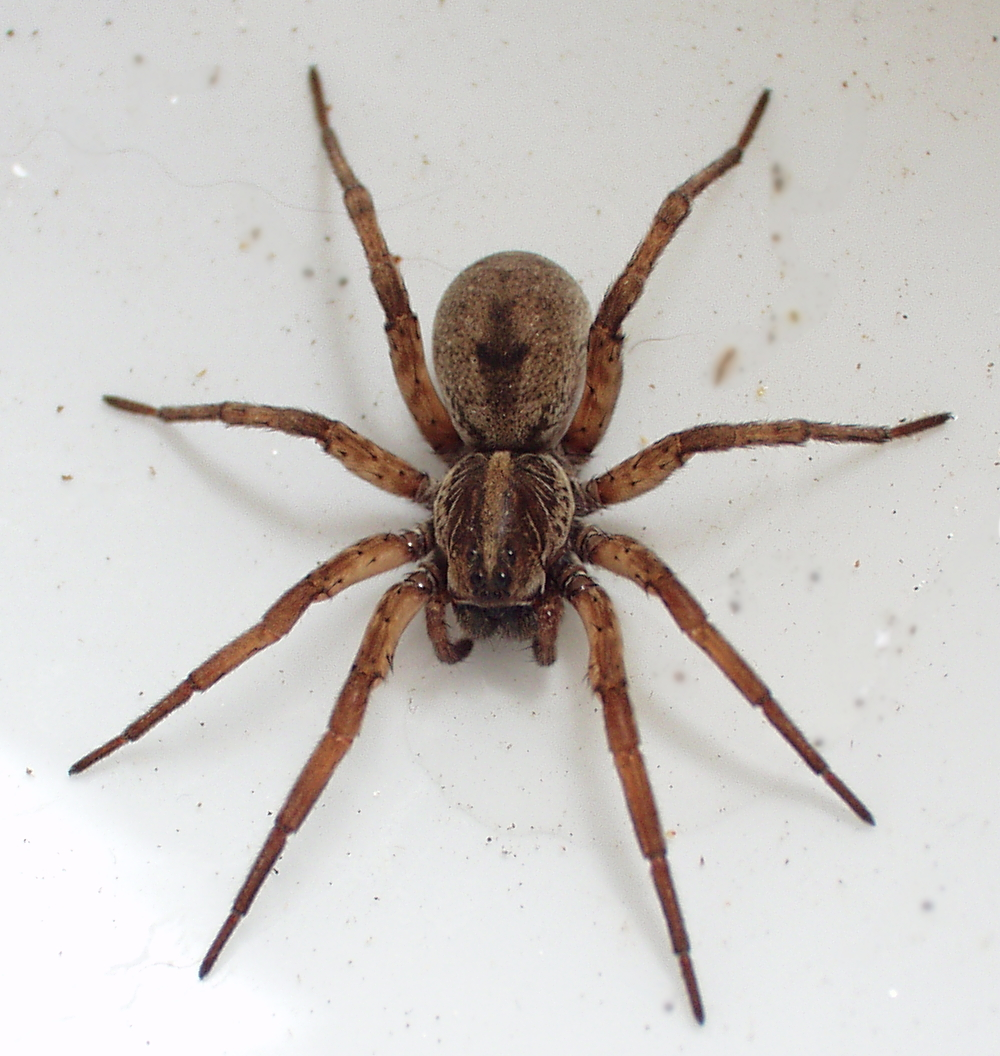
H. lenta threat display

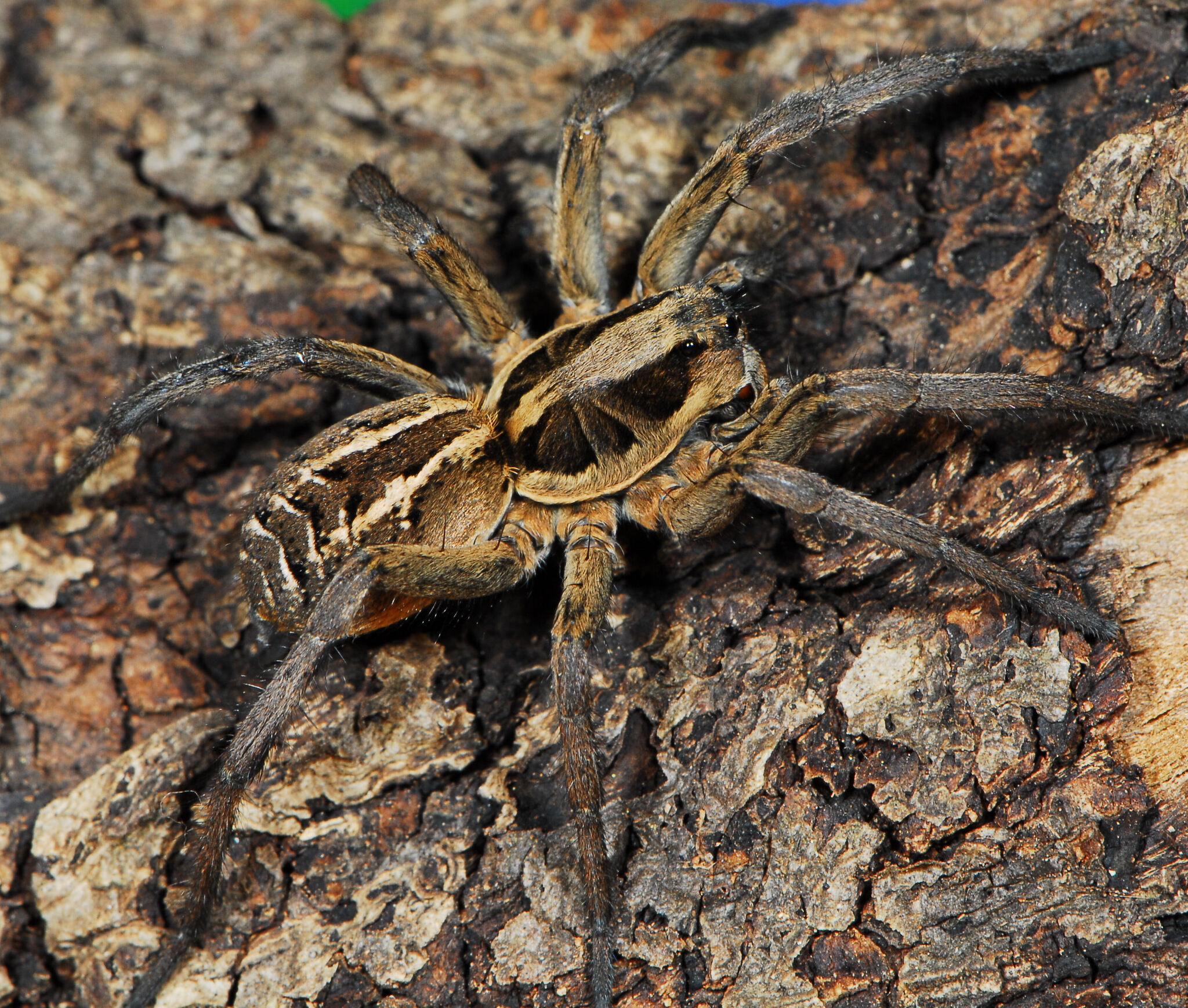
female H. transvaalica

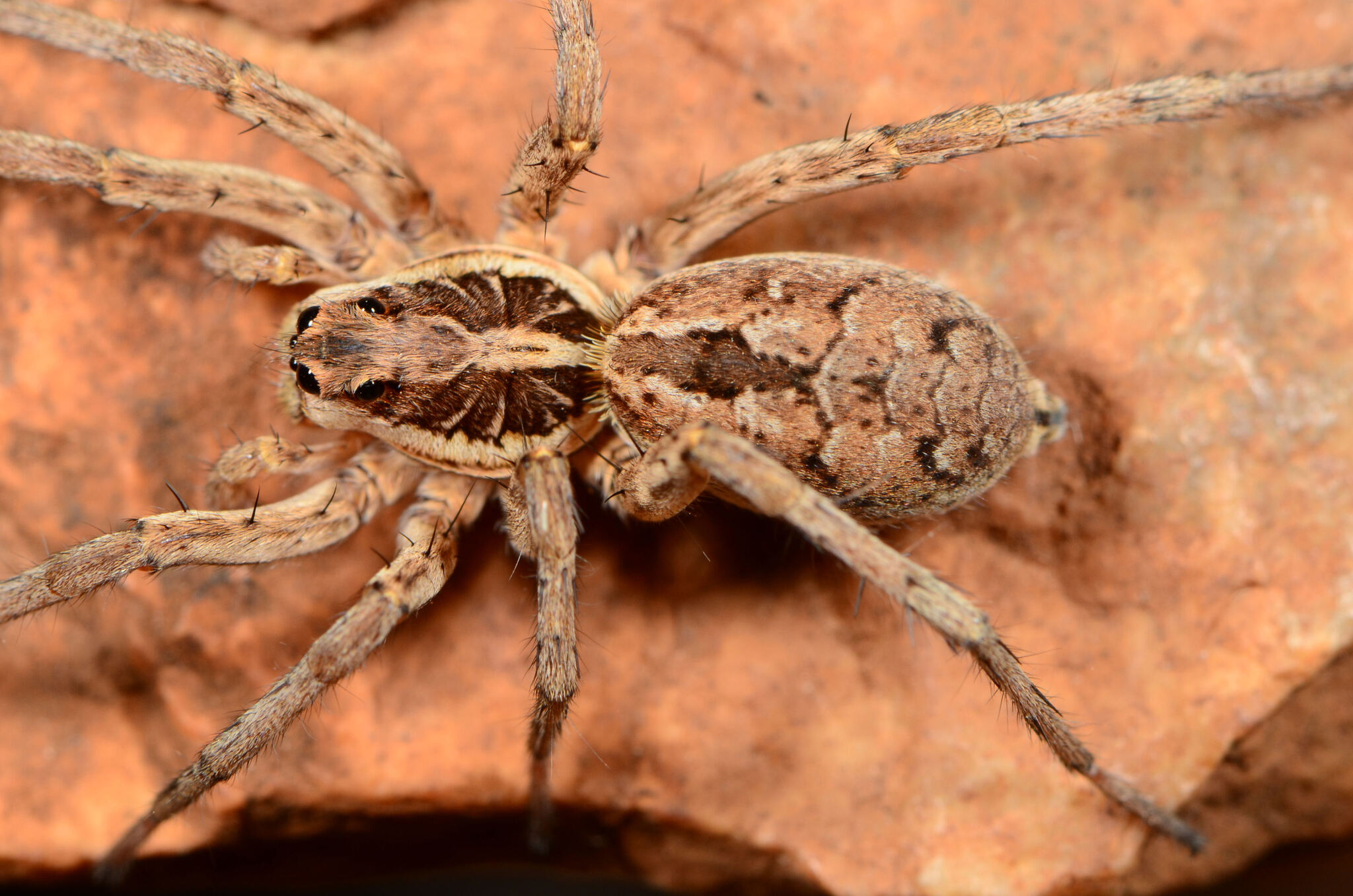
female H. zuluana

As of October 2025, this genus includes 229 species and four subspecies.

These species have articles on Wikipedia:

- Hogna adjacens Roewer, 1959 – South Africa
- Hogna antelucana (Montgomery, 1904) – United States
- Hogna arborea Lo, Wei & Cheng, 2023 – Taiwan
- Hogna baltimoriana (Keyserling, 1877) – Canada, United States
- Hogna bimaculata (Purcell, 1903) – Namibia, Botswana, South Africa
- Hogna carolinensis (Walckenaer, 1805) – Canada, United States, Mexico
- Hogna coloradensis (Banks, 1894) – United States, Mexico
- Hogna denisi Roewer, 1959 – South Africa
- Hogna deweti Roewer, 1959 – South Africa
- Hogna ericeticola (Wallace, 1942) – United States
- Hogna frondicola (Emerton, 1885) – Canada, United States
- Hogna idonea Roewer, 1959 – South Africa
- Hogna infulata Roewer, 1959 – South Africa
- Hogna ingens (Blackwall, 1857) – Madeira
- Hogna lawrencei (Roewer, 1960) – Botswana, South Africa
- Hogna lenta (Hentz, 1844) – United States
- Hogna lupina (Karsch, 1879) – Sri Lanka
- Hogna miami (Wallace, 1942) – United States
- Hogna pseudoceratiola (Wallace, 1942) – United States
- Hogna radiata (Latreille, 1817) – Europe, Turkey, Caucasus, Russia (Europe to South Siberia), Middle East, Iran, Kazakhstan, Central Asia (type species)
  - H. r. minor (Simon, 1876) – Mediterranean
- Hogna schreineri (Purcell, 1903) – Namibia, South Africa
- Hogna simoni Roewer, 1959 – Cameroon, DR Congo, Angola, South Africa
- Hogna spenceri (Pocock, 1898) – Rwanda, South Africa, Eswatini
- Hogna thetis (Simon, 1909) – São Tomé and Príncipe
- Hogna transvaalica (Simon, 1898) – Botswana, South Africa
- Hogna unicolor Roewer, 1959 – Mozambique, South Africa
- Hogna zuluana Roewer, 1959 – South Africa

Complete species list as of October 2025
- Hogna ackermanni Logunov, 2020 – Afghanistan
- Hogna adjacens Roewer, 1959 – South Africa
- Hogna agadira (Roewer, 1960) – Morocco
- Hogna albemarlensis (Banks, 1902) – Galapagos
- Hogna alexandria (Roewer, 1960) – Egypt
- Hogna ammophila (Wallace, 1942) – United States
- Hogna andina (Chamberlin, 1916) – Peru
- Hogna andreinii Reimoser, 1937 – Ethiopia
- Hogna angusta (Tullgren, 1901) – United States
- Hogna antelucana (Montgomery, 1904) – United States
- Hogna antiguiana Roewer, 1955 – Antigua and Barbuda (Antigua)
- Hogna arborea Lo, Wei & Cheng, 2023 – Taiwan
- Hogna archaeologica (Chamberlin, 1925) – Mexico
- Hogna argentinensis (Mello-Leitão, 1941) – Argentina
- Hogna atramentata (Karsch, 1879) – Central, East Africa
- Hogna auricoma (Keyserling, 1891) – Brazil
- Hogna badia (Keyserling, 1877) – Cuba, Central America
- Hogna balearica (Thorell, 1873) – Spain (Balearic Is.)
- Hogna baliana Roewer, 1959 – Cameroon
- Hogna baltimoriana (Keyserling, 1877) – Canada, United States
- Hogna bellatrix (L. Koch, 1865) – Australia
- Hogna beniana (Strand, 1913) – Central, East Africa
- Hogna bergsoei (Thorell, 1875) – Caucasus (Russia), Turkmenistan
- Hogna bhougavia Roewer, 1960 – Afghanistan
- Hogna bicoloripes (Roewer, 1960) – Cameroon
- Hogna bifasciata (Buchar, 1997) – Bhutan, China
- Hogna bimaculata (Purcell, 1903) – Namibia, Botswana, South Africa
- Hogna birabeni (Mello-Leitão, 1938) – Argentina
- Hogna bivittata (Mello-Leitão, 1939) – Argentina
- Hogna blackwalli (Johnson, 1862) – Madeira
- Hogna bonifacioi Barrion & Litsinger, 1995 – Philippines
- Hogna bottegoi Caporiacco, 1940 – Ethiopia
- Hogna bowonglangi (Merian, 1911) – Indonesia (Sulawesi)
- Hogna brevitarsis (F. O. Pickard-Cambridge, 1902) – Mexico to Panama
- Hogna brunnea (Bösenberg, 1895) – Canary Islands
- Hogna bruta (Karsch, 1880) – Polynesia
- Hogna burti (Hickman, 1944) – Australia (South Australia)
- Hogna caduca (Karsch, 1880) – Hawaii
- Hogna canariana (Roewer, 1960) – Canary Islands
- Hogna carolinensis (Walckenaer, 1805) – Canada, United States, Mexico
- Hogna chickeringi (Chamberlin & Ivie, 1936) – Panama
- Hogna cinica (Tongiorgi, 1977) – St. Helena
- Hogna coloradensis (Banks, 1894) – United States, Mexico
- Hogna colosii (Caporiacco, 1947) – Guyana
- Hogna commota (Gertsch, 1934) – Colombia
- Hogna conspersa (L. Koch, 1882) – Spain (Balearic Is.)
- Hogna constricta (F. O. Pickard-Cambridge, 1902) – Guatemala
- Hogna cosquin (Mello-Leitão, 1941) – Argentina
- Hogna crispipes (L. Koch, 1877) – Australia (mainland, Norfolk Is.), New Guinea, Vanuatu, Polynesia, New Zealand
- Hogna dauana Roewer, 1959 – Ethiopia
- Hogna defucata Roewer, 1959 – DR Congo
- Hogna denisi Roewer, 1959 – South Africa
- Hogna deweti Roewer, 1959 – South Africa
- Hogna diyari Framenau, Gotch & Austin, 2006 – Australia (Queensland, New South Wales, South Australia)
- Hogna duala Roewer, 1959 – Cameroon
- Hogna effera (O. Pickard-Cambridge, 1872) – Cyprus, Turkey, Egypt, Israel, Lebanon, Syria, Yemen (Sokotra), Saudi Arabia, United Arab Emirates, Iraq, Iran
- Hogna efformata Roewer, 1959 – Namibia
- Hogna electa Roewer, 1959 – Tanzania
- Hogna enecens Roewer, 1959 – Kenya
- Hogna ericeticola (Wallace, 1942) – United States
- Hogna espanola Baert & Maelfait, 2008 – Galapagos
- Hogna estrix Roewer, 1959 – Namibia
- Hogna etoshana Roewer, 1959 – Namibia
- Hogna exigua (Roewer, 1960) – Namibia
- Hogna exsiccatella (Strand, 1916) – Guatemala
- Hogna felina (L. Koch, 1878) – Azerbaijan
- Hogna ferocella (Strand, 1916) – Canary Islands
- Hogna ferox (Lucas, 1838) – Canary Islands, Madeira, Spain, Malta, North Africa
- Hogna filicum (Karsch, 1880) – Polynesia
- Hogna flava Roewer, 1959 – Namibia
- Hogna forsteri Caporiacco, 1955 – Venezuela
- Hogna fraissei (L. Koch, 1882) – Spain (Majorca)
- Hogna frondicola (Emerton, 1885) – Canada, United States
- Hogna furva (Thorell, 1899) – Sierra Leone, Cameroon, Equatorial Guinea (Bioko)
  - H. f. cingulipes (Simon, 1909) – Equatorial Guinea (Annobon Is.)
- Hogna furvescens (Simon, 1910) – Botswana
- Hogna gabonensis Roewer, 1959 – Gabon
- Hogna galapagoensis (Banks, 1902) – Galapagos
- Hogna graeca (Roewer, 1951) – Greece, Turkey, Israel
- Hogna gratiosa Roewer, 1959 – Tanzania (Zanzibar)
- Hogna grazianii (Caporiacco, 1939) – Ethiopia
- Hogna gumia (Petrunkevitch, 1911) – Bolivia
- Hogna guttatula (F. O. Pickard-Cambridge, 1902) – Mexico
- Hogna hawaiiensis (Simon, 1899) – Hawaii
- Hogna heeri (Thorell, 1875) – Madeira
- Hogna hendrickxi Baert & Maelfait, 2008 – Galapagos
- Hogna hereroana (Roewer, 1960) – Namibia
- Hogna hibernalis (Strand, 1906) – Ethiopia
- Hogna hickmani Caporiacco, 1955 – Venezuela
- Hogna hippasimorpha (Strand, 1913) – Central Africa
- Hogna idonea Roewer, 1959 – South Africa
- Hogna indefinida (Mello-Leitão, 1941) – Argentina
- Hogna infulata Roewer, 1959 – South Africa
- Hogna ingens (Blackwall, 1857) – Madeira
- Hogna inhambania Roewer, 1955 – Mozambique
- Hogna inominata (Simon, 1886) – Thailand
- Hogna inops (Thorell, 1890) – Indonesia (Sumatra, Borneo, Sulawesi)
  - H. i. lompobattangi (Merian, 1911) – Indonesia (Sulawesi)
  - H. i. masarangi (Merian, 1911) – Indonesia (Sulawesi)
- Hogna insulana (L. Koch, 1882) – Spain (Majorca)
- Hogna insularum (Kulczyński, 1899) – Madeira
- Hogna interrita Roewer, 1959 – Zimbabwe
- Hogna irascibilis (O. Pickard-Cambridge, 1885) – India
- Hogna irumua (Strand, 1913) – Central Africa
- Hogna isambertoi Crespo, 2022 – Madeira
- Hogna jacquesbreli Baert & Maelfait, 2008 – Galapagos
- Hogna jiafui Peng, Yin, Zhang & Kim, 1997 – China
- Hogna juanensis (Strand, 1907) – Mozambique
- Hogna junco Baert & Maelfait, 2008 – Galapagos
- Hogna kabwea Roewer, 1959 – Congo
- Hogna kankunda Roewer, 1959 – Congo
- Hogna karschi (Roewer, 1951) – São Tomé and Príncipe
- Hogna kuyani Framenau, Gotch & Austin, 2006 – Australia
- Hogna labrea (Chamberlin & Ivie, 1942) – United States
- Hogna lacertosa (L. Koch, 1877) – Australia (South Australia)
- Hogna lambarenensis (Simon, 1909) – Congo
- Hogna landanae (Simon, 1878) – West Africa, Angola
- Hogna landanella Roewer, 1959 – Angola
- Hogna lawrencei (Roewer, 1960) – Botswana, South Africa
- Hogna lenta (Hentz, 1844) – United States
- Hogna leprieuri (Simon, 1876) – Algeria
- Hogna leucocephala (L. Koch, 1879) – Kazakhstan
- Hogna levis (Karsch, 1879) – West, Central Africa
- Hogna liberiaca Roewer, 1959 – Liberia
- Hogna likelikeae (Simon, 1900) – Hawaii
- Hogna litigiosa Roewer, 1959 – Angola
- Hogna longitarsis (F. O. Pickard-Cambridge, 1902) – Mexico, Costa Rica, Panama
- Hogna luctuosa (Mello-Leitão, 1947) – Brazil
- Hogna luederitzi (Simon, 1910) – Namibia
- Hogna lufirana (Roewer, 1960) – Congo
- Hogna lupina (Karsch, 1879) – Sri Lanka
- Hogna maasi (Gertsch & Wallace, 1937) – Mexico
- Hogna mabwensis Roewer, 1959 – Congo
- Hogna maderiana (Walckenaer, 1837) – Madeira
- Hogna magnoseptum (Guy, 1966) – Morocco
- Hogna maheana Roewer, 1959 – Seychelles
- Hogna manicola (Strand, 1906) – Ethiopia
- Hogna maroccana (Roewer, 1960) – Morocco
- Hogna maruana (Roewer, 1960) – Cameroon
- Hogna massaiensis (Roewer, 1960) – Tanzania
- Hogna massauana Roewer, 1959 – Eritrea
- Hogna maurusia (Simon, 1909) – Morocco
- Hogna medellina (Strand, 1914) – Colombia
- Hogna miami (Wallace, 1942) – United States
- Hogna migdilybs (Simon, 1886) – Senegal
- Hogna morosina (Banks, 1909) – Costa Rica
- Hogna munoiensis Roewer, 1959 – Congo
- Hogna nairobia (Roewer, 1960) – Kenya
- Hogna nervosa (Keyserling, 1891) – Brazil
- Hogna nigerrima (Roewer, 1960) – Tanzania
- Hogna nigrosecta (Mello-Leitão, 1940) – Argentina
- Hogna nimia Roewer, 1959 – Tanzania
- Hogna nonannulata Wunderlich, 1995 – Madeira
- Hogna nychthemera (Bertkau, 1880) – Brazil
- Hogna oaxacana (Gertsch & Wallace, 1937) – Mexico
- Hogna ocellata (L. Koch, 1878) – Azerbaijan
- Hogna ocyalina (Simon, 1910) – Botswana
- Hogna optabilis Roewer, 1959 – Congo
- Hogna ornata (Perty, 1833) – Brazil
- Hogna osceola (Gertsch & Wallace, 1937) – United States
- Hogna otaviensis (Roewer, 1960) – Namibia
- Hogna pardalina (Bertkau, 1880) – Brazil
- Hogna parvagenitalia (Guy, 1966) – Canary Islands
- Hogna patens Roewer, 1959 – Zimbabwe
- Hogna patricki (Purcell, 1903) – Southern Africa
- Hogna pauciguttata Roewer, 1959 – Mozambique
- Hogna persimilis (Banks, 1898) – Mexico
- Hogna perspicua Roewer, 1959 – Ethiopia
- Hogna petersi (Karsch, 1878) – Mozambique
- Hogna petiti (Simon, 1877) – Congo
- Hogna placata Roewer, 1959 – Lesotho
- Hogna posticata (Banks, 1904) – United States
- Hogna principum (Simon, 1909) – São Tomé and Príncipe
- Hogna propria Roewer, 1959 – Tanzania
- Hogna proterva Roewer, 1959 – Congo
- Hogna pseudoceratiola (Wallace, 1942) – United States
- Hogna pseudoradiata (Guy, 1966) – Morocco?
- Hogna pugil (Bertkau, 1880) – Brazil
- Hogna pulchella (Keyserling, 1877) – Colombia
- Hogna pulla (Bösenberg & Lenz, 1895) – East Africa
- Hogna pulloides (Strand, 1908) – Ethiopia
- Hogna radiata (Latreille, 1817) – Europe, Turkey, Caucasus, Russia (Europe to South Siberia), Middle East, Iran, Kazakhstan, Central Asia (type species)
  - H. r. minor (Simon, 1876) – Mediterranean
- Hogna raffrayi (Simon, 1876) – East Africa, Zanzibar
- Hogna reducta (Bryant, 1942) – Virgin Is.
- Hogna reimoseri Roewer, 1959 – Ethiopia
- Hogna rizali Barrion & Litsinger, 1995 – Philippines
- Hogna rubetra (Schenkel, 1963) – China
- Hogna rubromandibulata (O. Pickard-Cambridge, 1885) – Pakistan, India
- Hogna rufimanoides (Strand, 1908) – Peru, Bolivia
- Hogna ruricolaris (Simon, 1910) – Botswana
- Hogna sanctithomasi (Petrunkevitch, 1926) – St. Thomas
- Hogna sanctivincenti (Simon, 1898) – Virgin Is. St. Vincent
- Hogna sanisabel (Strand, 1909) – Uruguay
- Hogna schreineri (Purcell, 1903) – Namibia, South Africa
- Hogna schultzei (Simon, 1910) – Botswana
- Hogna senilis (L. Koch, 1877) – Australia (New South Wales)
- Hogna simoni Roewer, 1959 – Cameroon, DR Congo, Angola, South Africa
- Hogna simplex (L. Koch, 1882) – Spain (Majorca)
- Hogna sinaia Roewer, 1959 – Egypt
- Hogna snodgrassi Banks, 1902 – Galapagos
- Hogna spenceri (Pocock, 1898) – Rwanda, South Africa, Eswatini
- Hogna sternalis (Bertkau, 1880) – Brazil
- Hogna stictopyga (Thorell, 1895) – India, Myanmar, Singapore
- Hogna straeleni Roewer, 1959 – Congo, Rwanda, Tanzania
- Hogna subaustralis (Strand, 1908) – Peru
- Hogna subligata (L. Koch, 1877) – Australia (Queensland)
- Hogna subtilis (Bryant, 1942) – Virgin Is.
- Hogna suprenans (Chamberlin, 1924) – United States
- Hogna swakopmundensis (Strand, 1916) – Namibia
- Hogna taurirtensis (Schenkel, 1937) – Morocco
- Hogna ternetzi (Mello-Leitão, 1939) – Paraguay
- Hogna teteana Roewer, 1959 – Mozambique
- Hogna thetis (Simon, 1909) – São Tomé and Príncipe
- Hogna tigana (Gertsch & Wallace, 1935) – United States
- Hogna timuqua (Wallace, 1942) – United States
- Hogna tivior (Chamberlin & Ivie, 1936) – Panama
- Hogna tlaxcalana (Gertsch & Davis, 1940) – Mexico
- Hogna transvaalica (Simon, 1898) – Botswana, South Africa
- Hogna travassosi (Mello-Leitão, 1939) – Brazil
- Hogna truculenta (O. Pickard-Cambridge, 1876) – Egypt
- Hogna trunca Yin, Bao & Zhang, 1996 – China, Japan
- Hogna unicolor Roewer, 1959 – Mozambique, South Africa
- Hogna vachoni Caporiacco, 1954 – French Guiana
- Hogna ventrilineata Caporiacco, 1954 – French Guiana
- Hogna volxemi (Bertkau, 1880) – Brazil
- Hogna vulpina (C. L. Koch, 1847) – Brazil
- Hogna wallacei (Chamberlin & Ivie, 1944) – United States
- Hogna watsoni (Gertsch, 1934) – United States
- Hogna willeyi (Pocock, 1898) – Papua New Guinea (New Britain)
- Hogna yauliensis (Strand, 1908) – Peru
- Hogna zorodes (Mello-Leitão, 1942) – Argentina
- Hogna zuluana Roewer, 1959 – South Africa
