= Hogna pseudoceratiola =

Scientific classification
- Kingdom: Animalia
- Phylum: Arthropoda
- Subphylum: Chelicerata
- Class: Arachnida
- Order: Araneae
- Infraorder: Araneomorphae
- Family: Lycosidae
- Genus: Hogna
- Species: H. pseudoceratiola

Binomial name
- Hogna pseudoceratiola (Wallace, 1942)

Species of spider

Hogna pseudoceratiola is a species of wolf spider in the genus Hogna of the family Lycosidae. It was described for the first time by H. K. Wallace in 1942.

H. pseudoceratiola is endemic to Florida scrubs on the Atlantic Coastal Ridge in Indian River, Martin, Miami-Dade, and Palm Beach counties, Florida.
