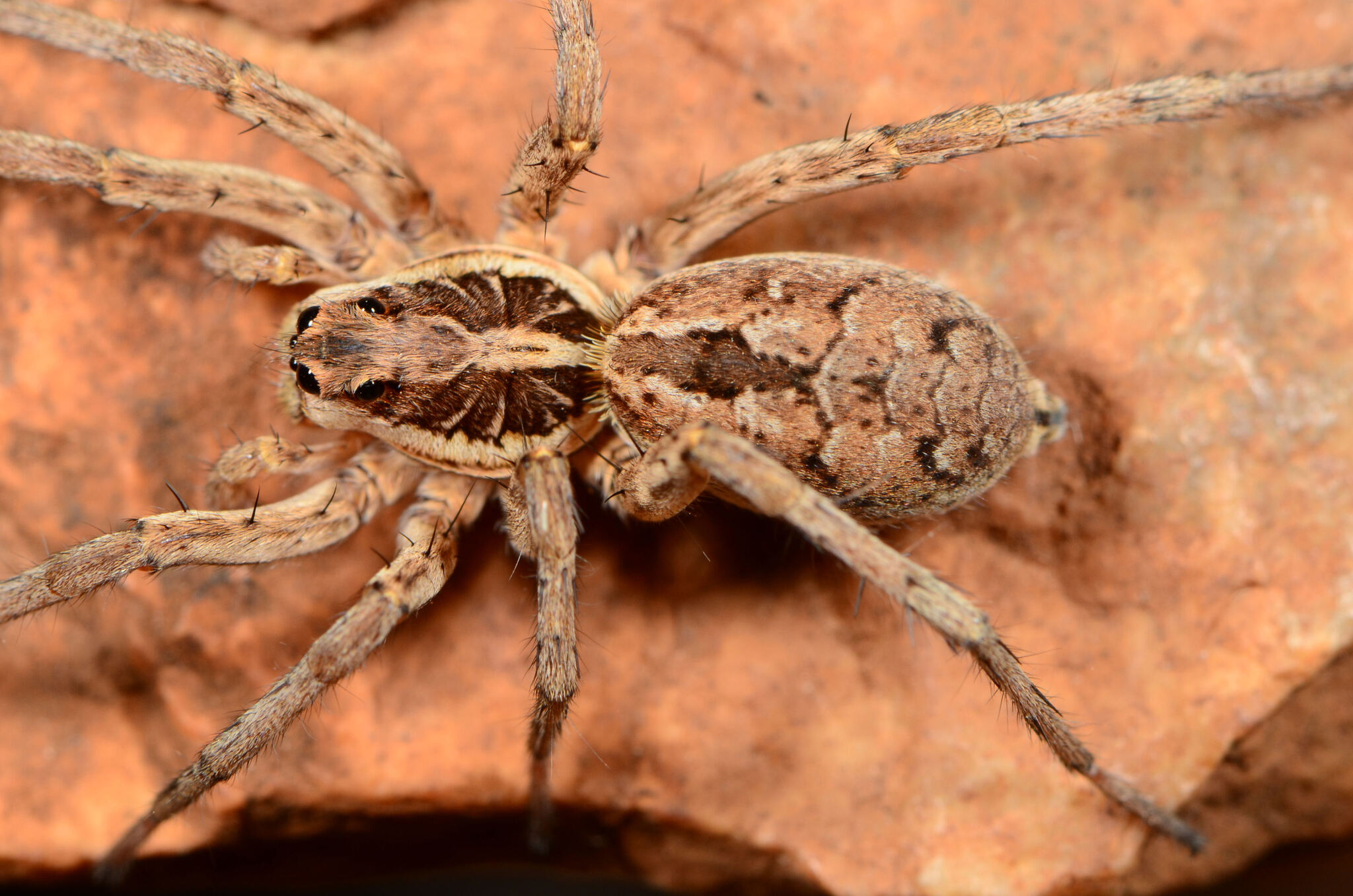
- female
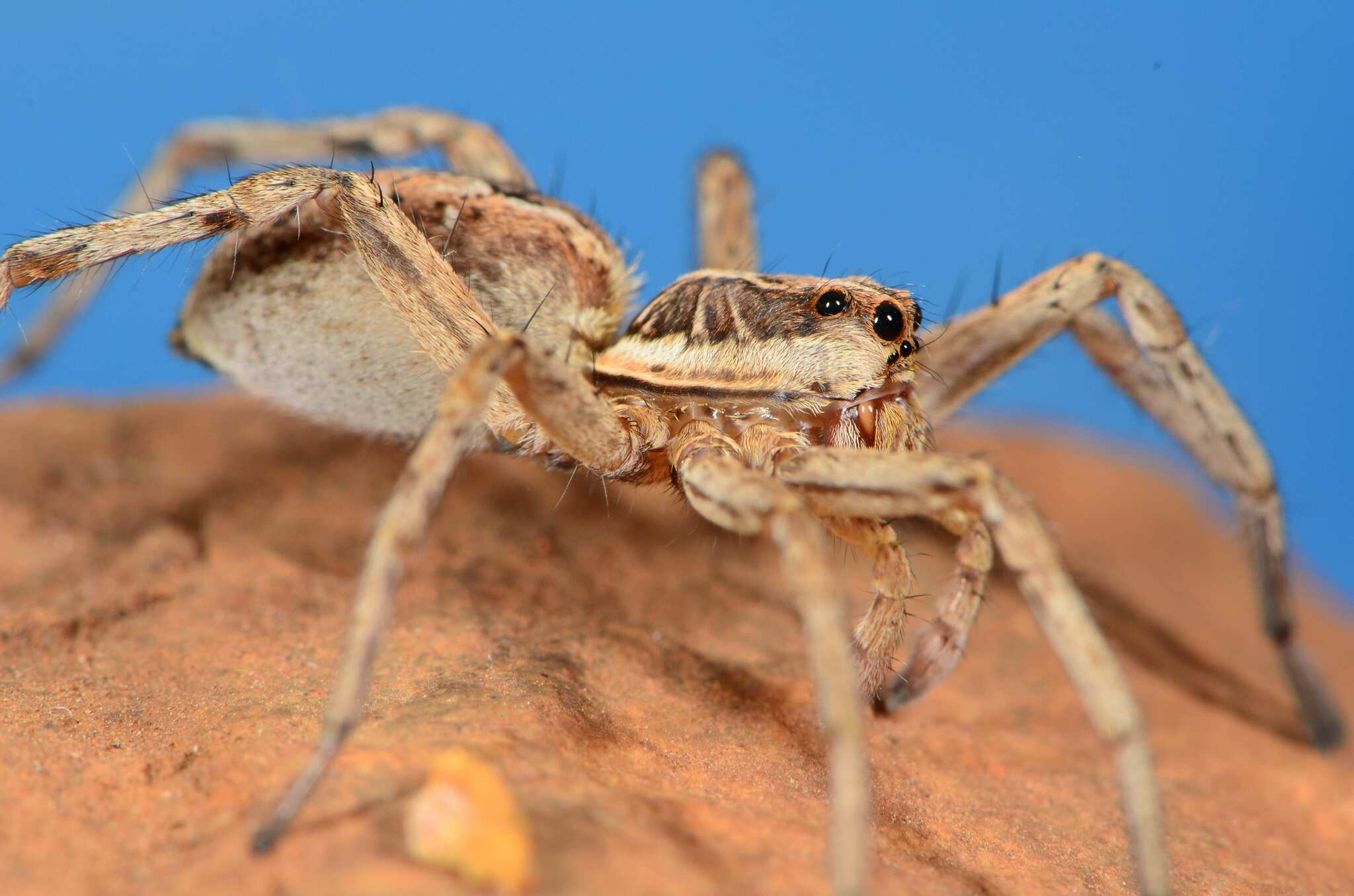
- female

Scientific classification
- Kingdom: Animalia
- Phylum: Arthropoda
- Subphylum: Chelicerata
- Class: Arachnida
- Order: Araneae
- Infraorder: Araneomorphae
- Family: Lycosidae
- Genus: Hogna
- Species: H. zuluana

Binomial name
- Hogna zuluana Roewer, 1959

= Hogna zuluana =

Banded burrow-living wolf spider

Species of spider

Hogna zuluana is a species of spider in the family Lycosidae. It is endemic to South Africa and is commonly known as the banded burrow-living wolf spider.

== Distribution ==
Hogna zuluana is found in four provinces of South Africa, Gauteng, KwaZulu-Natal, Limpopo, and Mpumalanga.

== Habitat and ecology ==
This species is a free-living ground dweller that lives in open burrows.

It has been sampled from the Grassland and Savanna biomes at altitudes ranging from 91 to 1730 m.

== Description ==
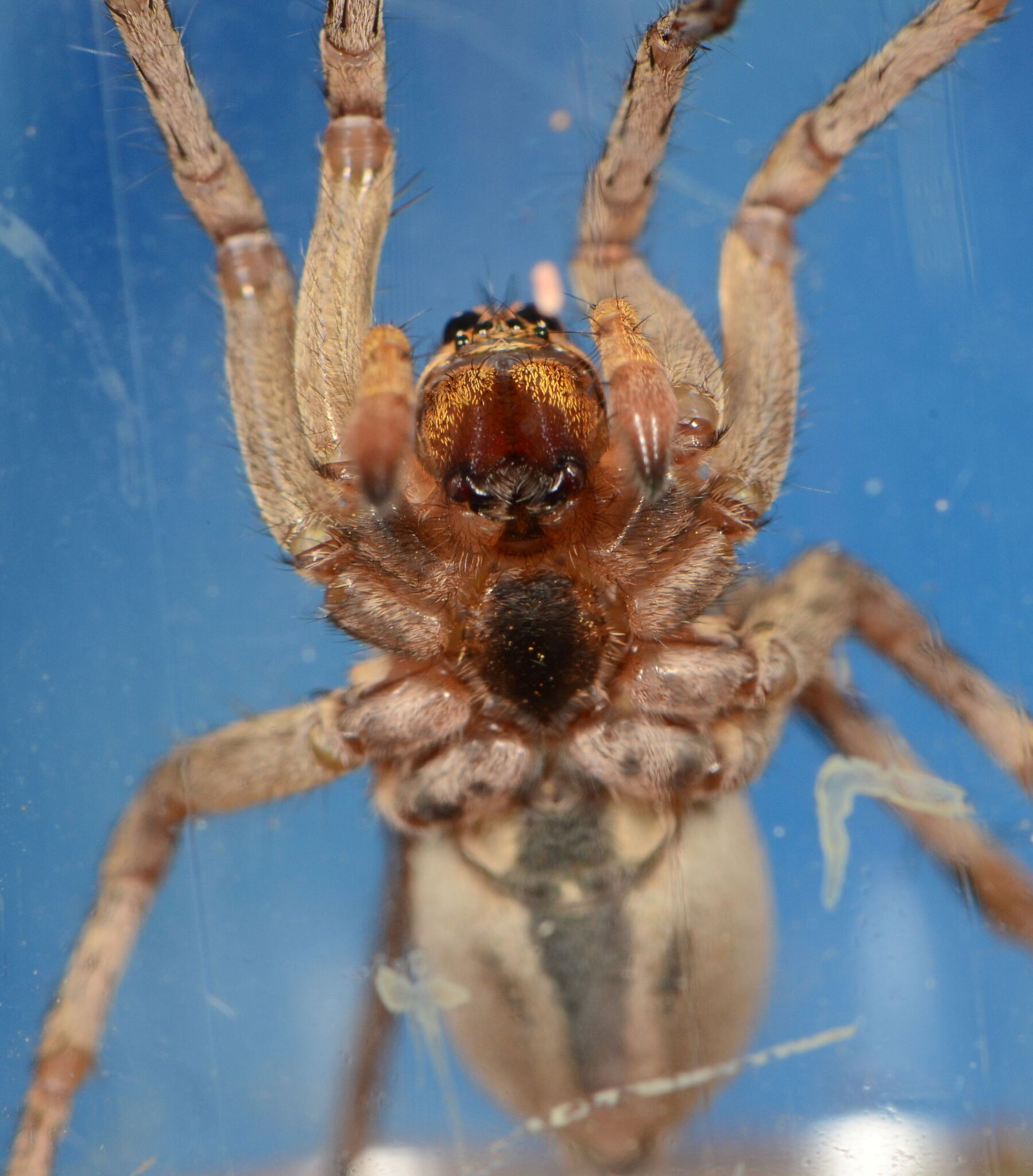
female

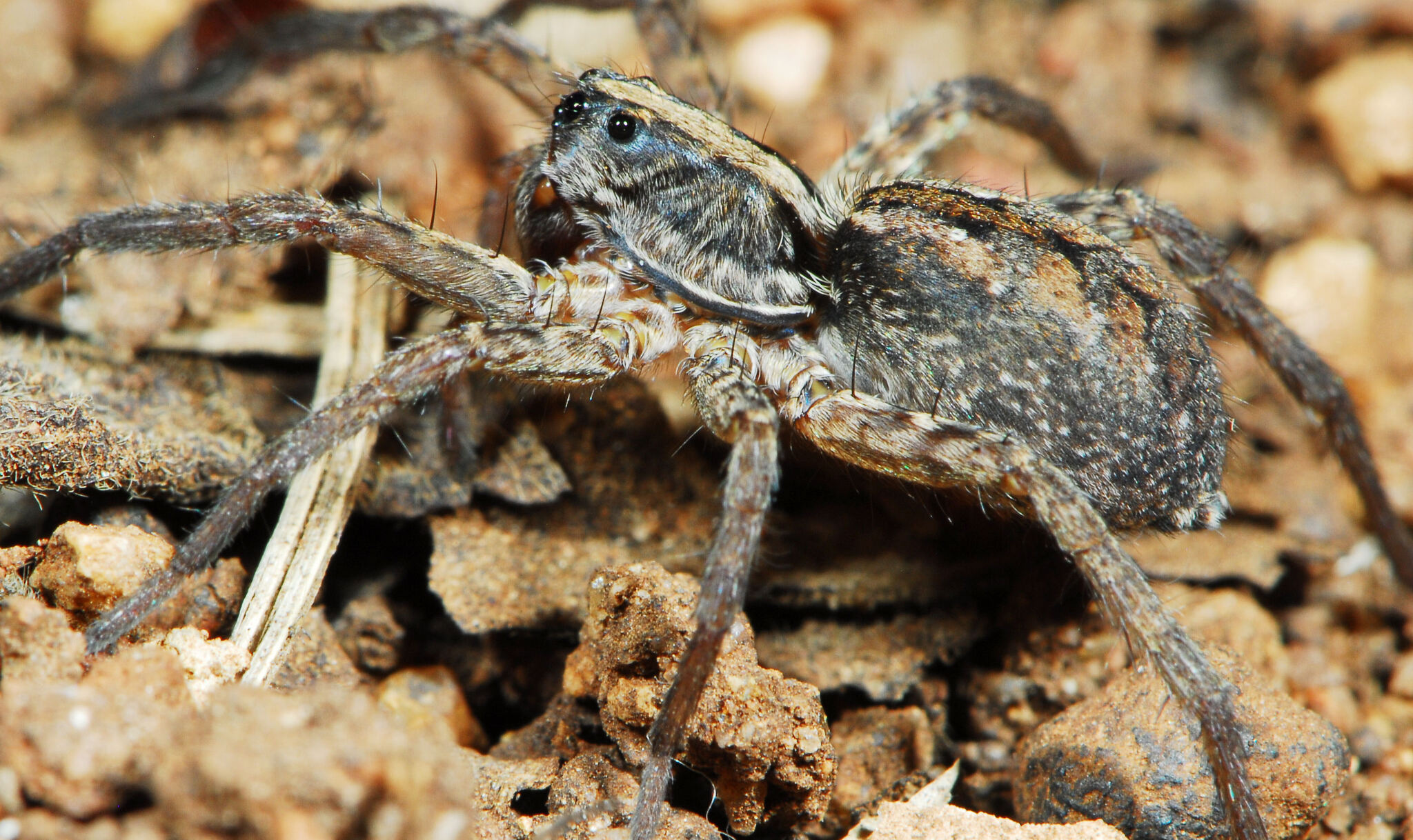
female

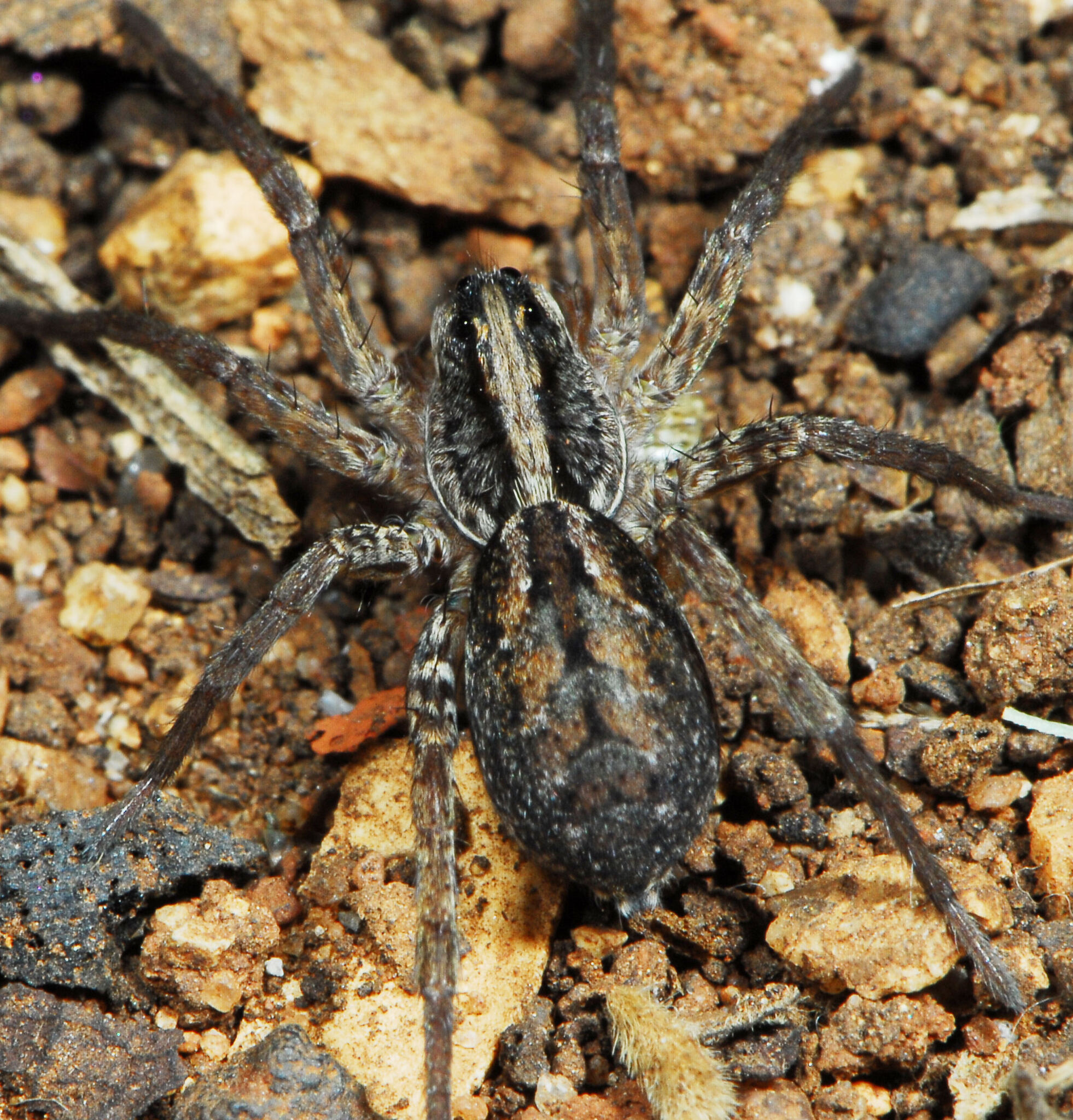
female

Hogna zuluana is known only from females.

The cephalothorax is red-brown with straight rusty yellow marginal bands and a rusty yellow median band that is barely widened in front of the striae. The eye region is black.

The abdomen is dorsally grey-brown, with an anterior median longitudinal angled blackish trapezoidal spot bordered on each side by three white hair spots that lie in a lateral light yellowish larger spot. Behind this are four to five median black angled spots accompanied on each side by a longitudinal row of three white-haired tufts. Ventrally, behind the pale yellow epigynal area, is a black median wedge mark surrounded by a black angular stripe that merges backwards to form a V. The sternum is pale yellow with a black median band.

== Conservation ==
The species has a large geographic range and is protected in Roodeplaatdam Nature Reserve, Faerie Glenn Nature Reserve, Klipriviersberg Nature Reserve, uMkhuze Game Reserve, and Kruger National Park.

== Etymology ==
Hogna zuluana is named after Zululand, a historical region in KwaZulu-Natal where the type locality is situated.

== Taxonomy ==
The species was described by Roewer in 1959, with the type locality given only as Zululand.
