= Hogna baltimoriana =

Scientific classification
- Kingdom: Animalia
- Phylum: Arthropoda
- Subphylum: Chelicerata
- Class: Arachnida
- Order: Araneae
- Infraorder: Araneomorphae
- Family: Lycosidae
- Genus: Hogna
- Species: H. baltimoriana

Binomial name
- Hogna baltimoriana (Keyserling, 1877)

Species of spider

Hogna baltimoriana is a species of wolf spider in the family Lycosidae. It is found in the US and Canada.
