= Hogna lupina =

Scientific classification
- Kingdom: Animalia
- Phylum: Arthropoda
- Subphylum: Chelicerata
- Class: Arachnida
- Order: Araneae
- Infraorder: Araneomorphae
- Family: Lycosidae
- Genus: Hogna
- Species: H. lupina

Binomial name
- Hogna lupina (Karsch, 1879)

Species of spider

Hogna lupina, is a species of spider of the genus Hogna. It is endemic to Sri Lanka.
