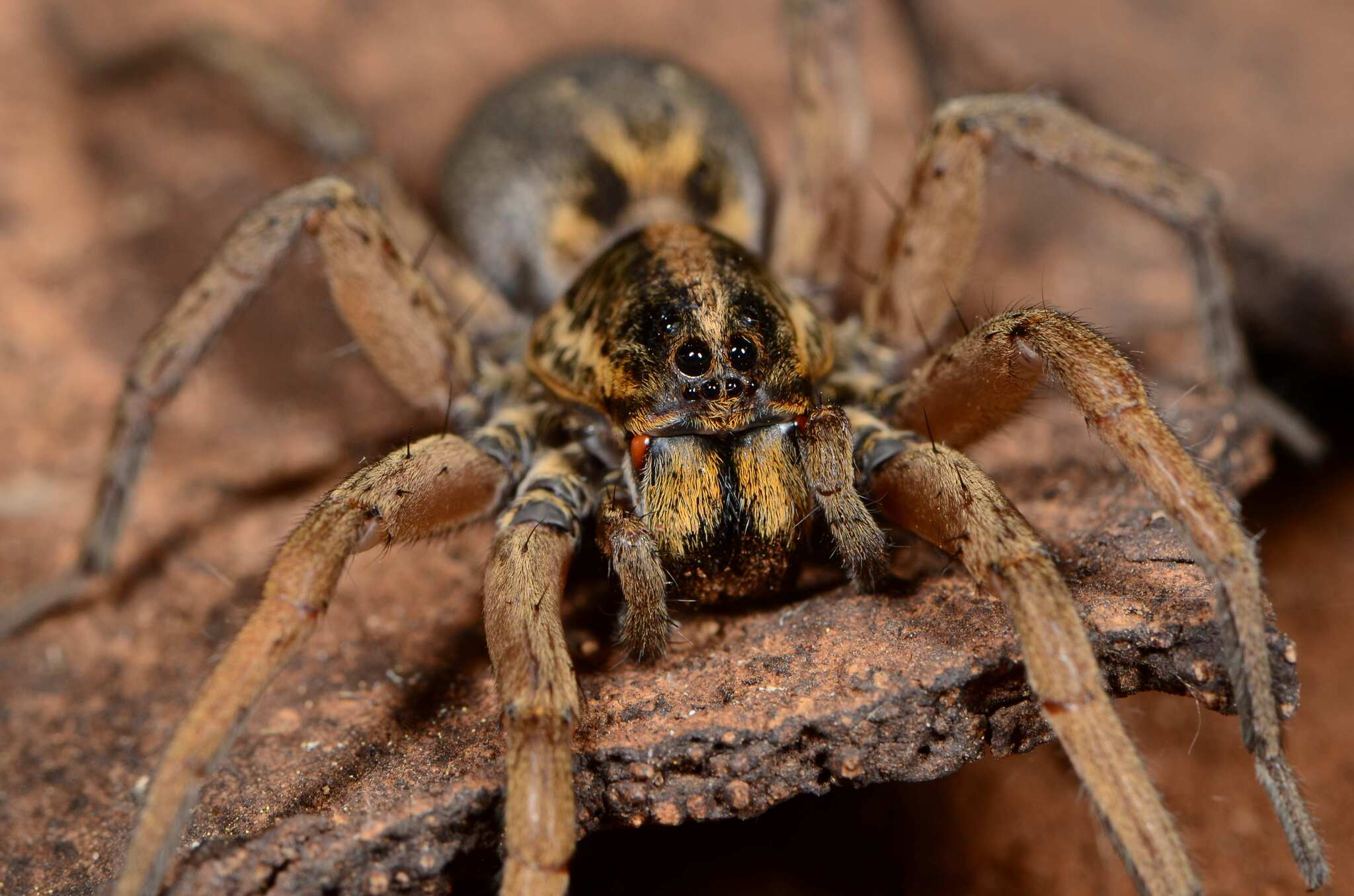
- female
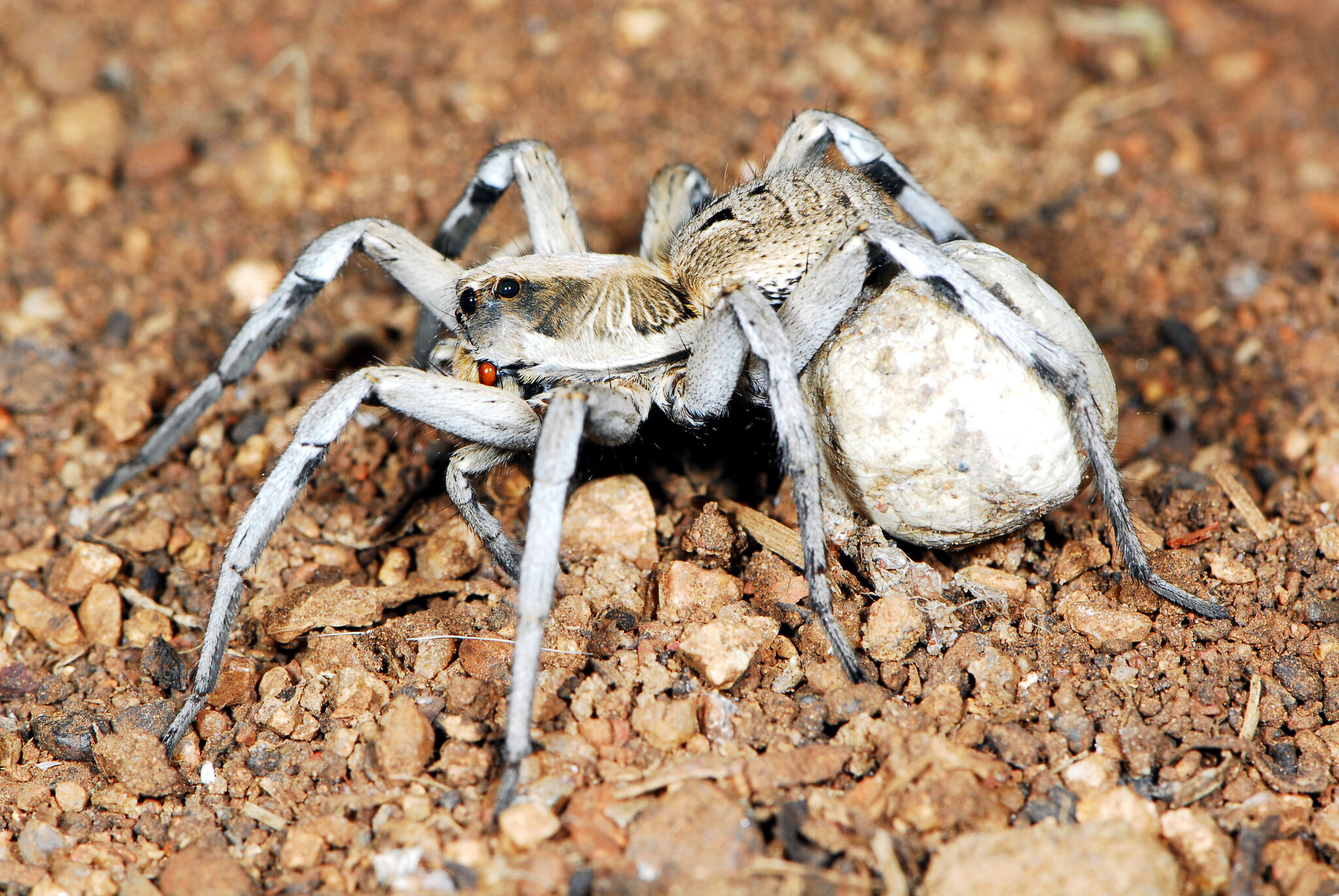
- female with egg sac

Scientific classification
- Kingdom: Animalia
- Phylum: Arthropoda
- Subphylum: Chelicerata
- Class: Arachnida
- Order: Araneae
- Infraorder: Araneomorphae
- Family: Lycosidae
- Genus: Hogna
- Species: H. spenceri

Binomial name
- Hogna spenceri (Pocock, 1898)

Synonyms
- Lycosa spenceri Pocock, 1898

= Hogna spenceri =

Large burrow-living wolf spider

Species of spider

Hogna spenceri is a species of spider in the family Lycosidae. It is found in Africa and is commonly known as the large burrow-living wolf spider.

== Distribution ==
Hogna spenceri is found in Rwanda, Eswatini, and South Africa.

In South Africa, it is recorded from Free State, Gauteng, KwaZulu-Natal, Limpopo, Mpumalanga, the Northern Cape, and North West.

== Habitat and ecology ==
This species is a free-living ground dweller that lives in open burrows.

It has been sampled from the Grassland and Savanna biomes at altitudes ranging from 17 to 1730 m. The species has also been sampled from cotton, maize, and strawberry fields.

== Description ==
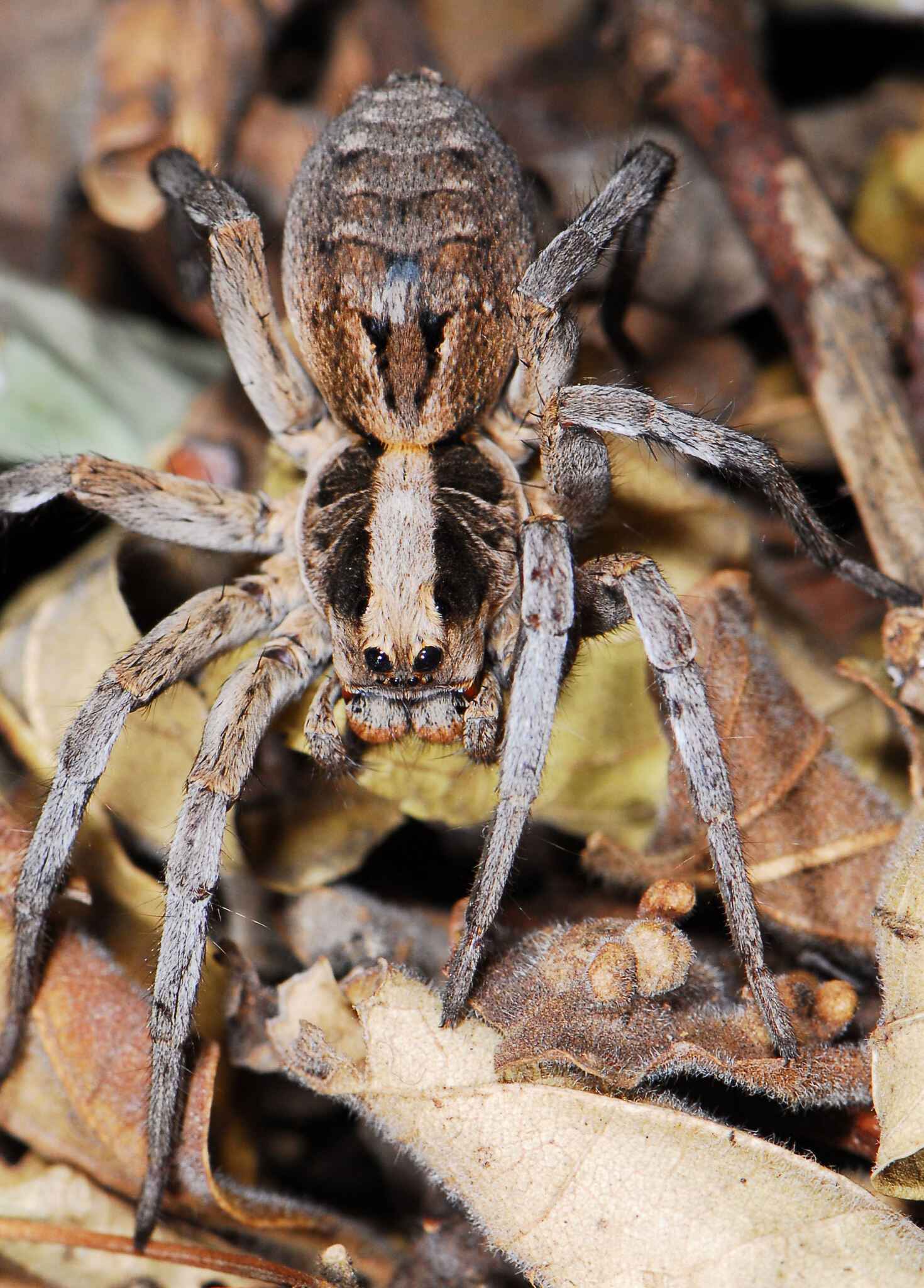
female

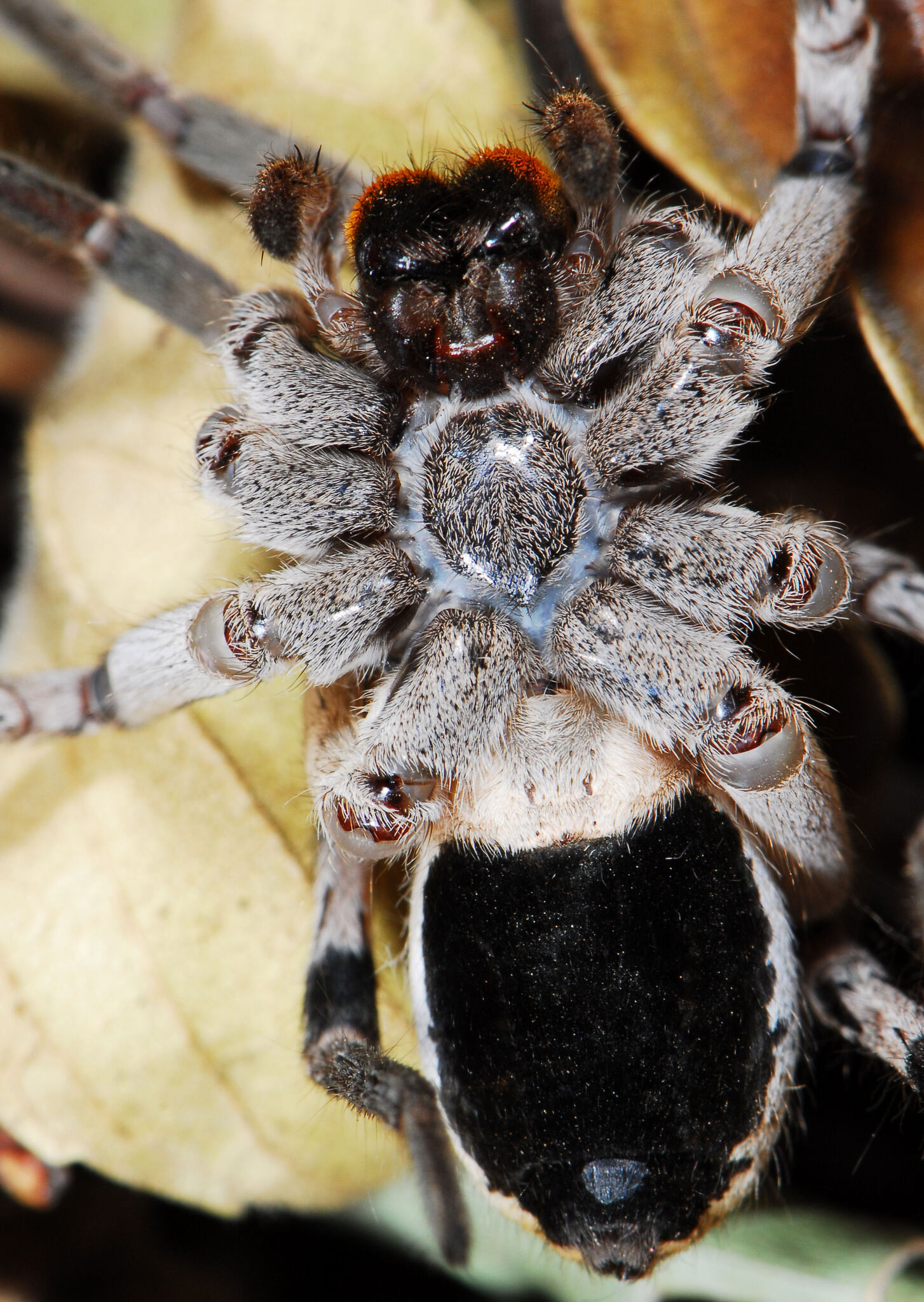
female, ventral view

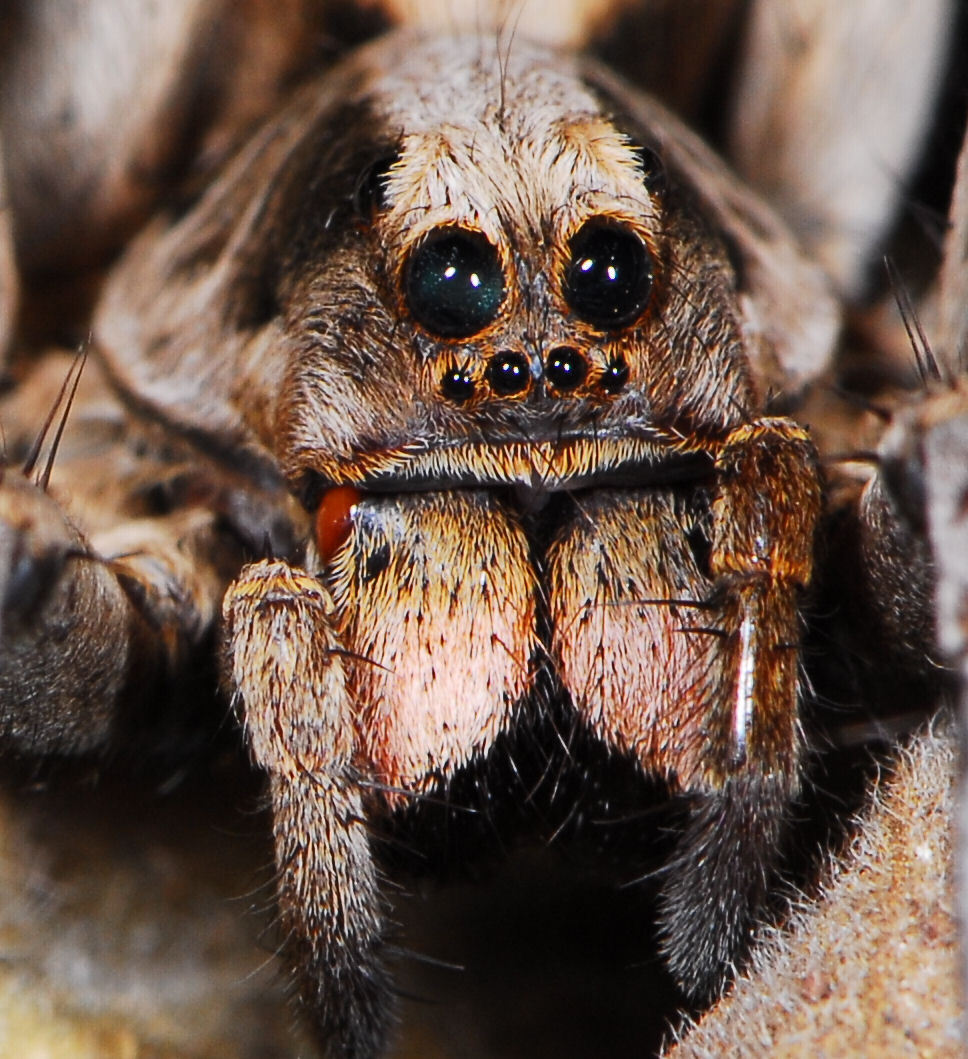
female

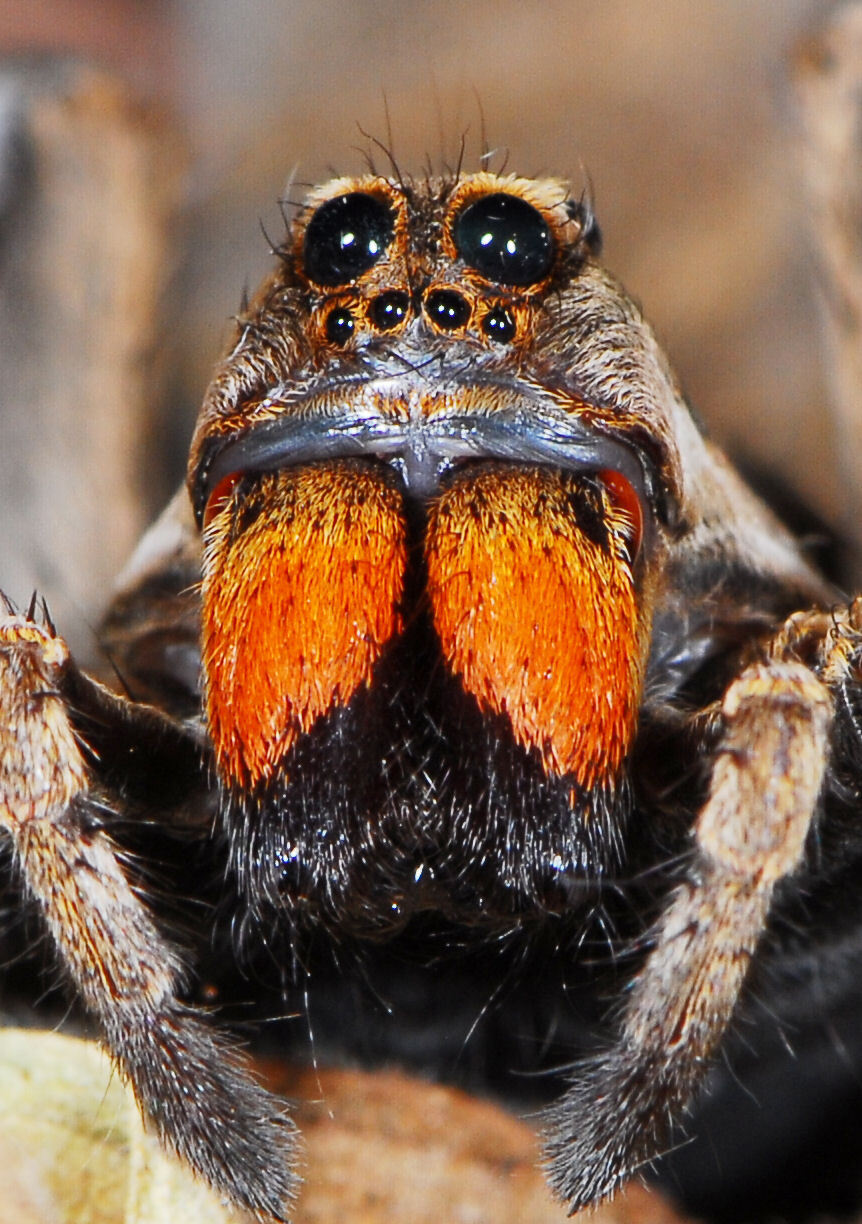
female

Hogna spenceri is known from both sexes.

The cephalothorax is chestnut brown with darker stripes hardly indicated, parallel-edged yellowish submarginal bands, and a hardly widened yellowish median band in front. The eye field is black.

The abdomen is dorsally somewhat lighter brown, with a blackish median band in front that is accompanied on both sides by an indistinctly delimited pale yellowish spot. Behind this, the band continues as two rows of five to six blackish angular spots each that extend to the rear end of the abdomen. The ventral abdomen, sternum, and coxae are deep black, while remaining leg segments are pale yellow and unspotted.

The chelicerae are dark brown and lightly hairy frontally. Females measure 22 mm in total length.

== Conservation ==
The species has a large geographic range and is protected in six protected areas.

== Taxonomy ==
The species was originally described by Pocock in 1898 as Lycosa spenceri from Durban. It was later revised by Roewer in 1960.
