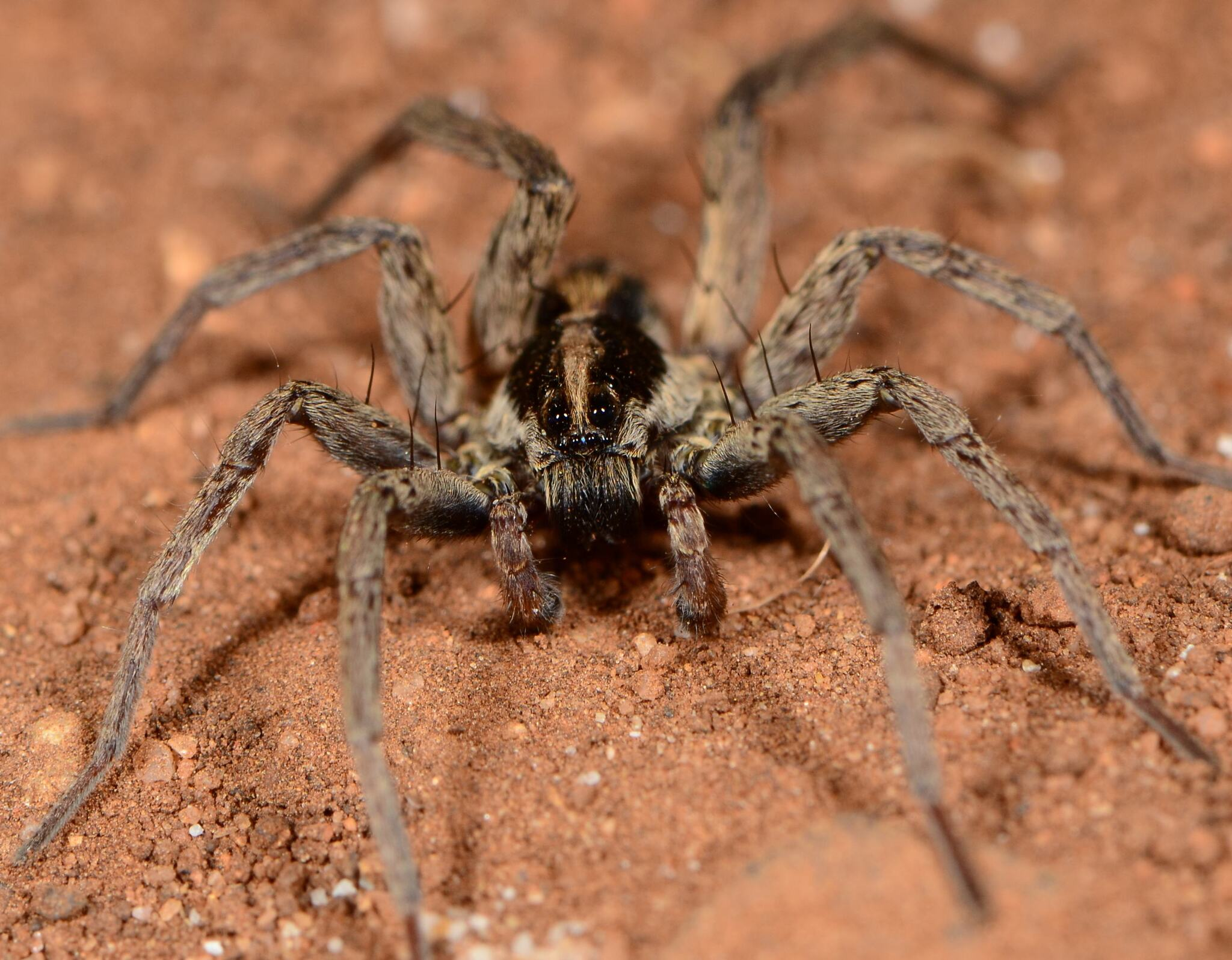
- Male
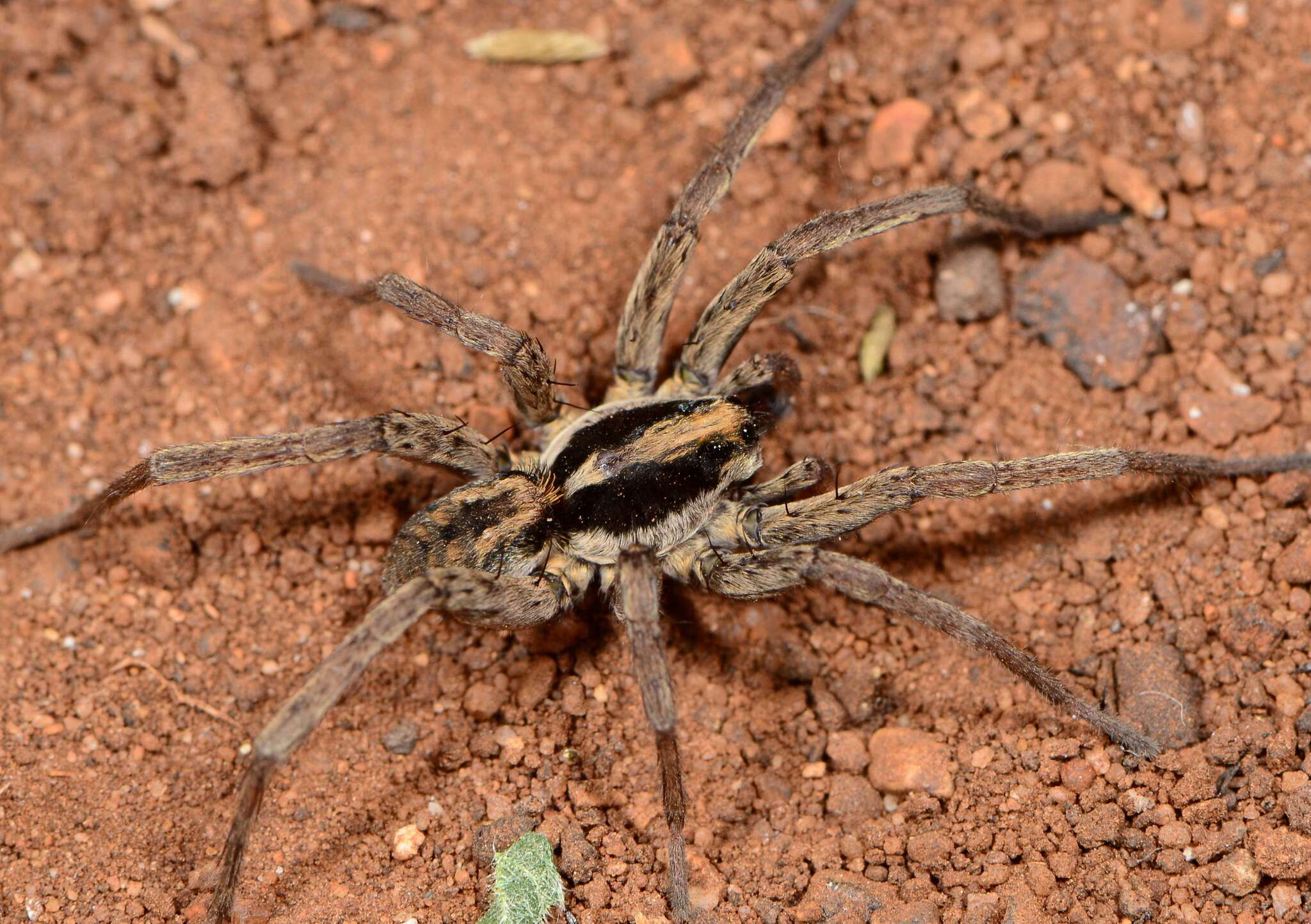
- Male

Scientific classification
- Kingdom: Animalia
- Phylum: Arthropoda
- Subphylum: Chelicerata
- Class: Arachnida
- Order: Araneae
- Infraorder: Araneomorphae
- Family: Lycosidae
- Genus: Hogna
- Species: H. adjacens

Binomial name
- Hogna adjacens Roewer, 1959

= Hogna adjacens =

Kimberley burrow-living wolf spider

Species of spider

Hogna adjacens is a species of spider in the family Lycosidae. It is endemic to South Africa and is commonly known as the Kimberley burrow-living wolf spider.

== Distribution ==
Hogna adjacens is found in the Northern Cape and Limpopo provinces of South Africa. Notable localities include Kimberley, Vyeboom, and Lekgalameetse Nature Reserve.

== Habitat and ecology ==
This species is a free-living ground dweller that lives in open burrows.

It has been sampled from the Savanna biome at altitudes ranging from 591 to 1218 m.

== Description ==
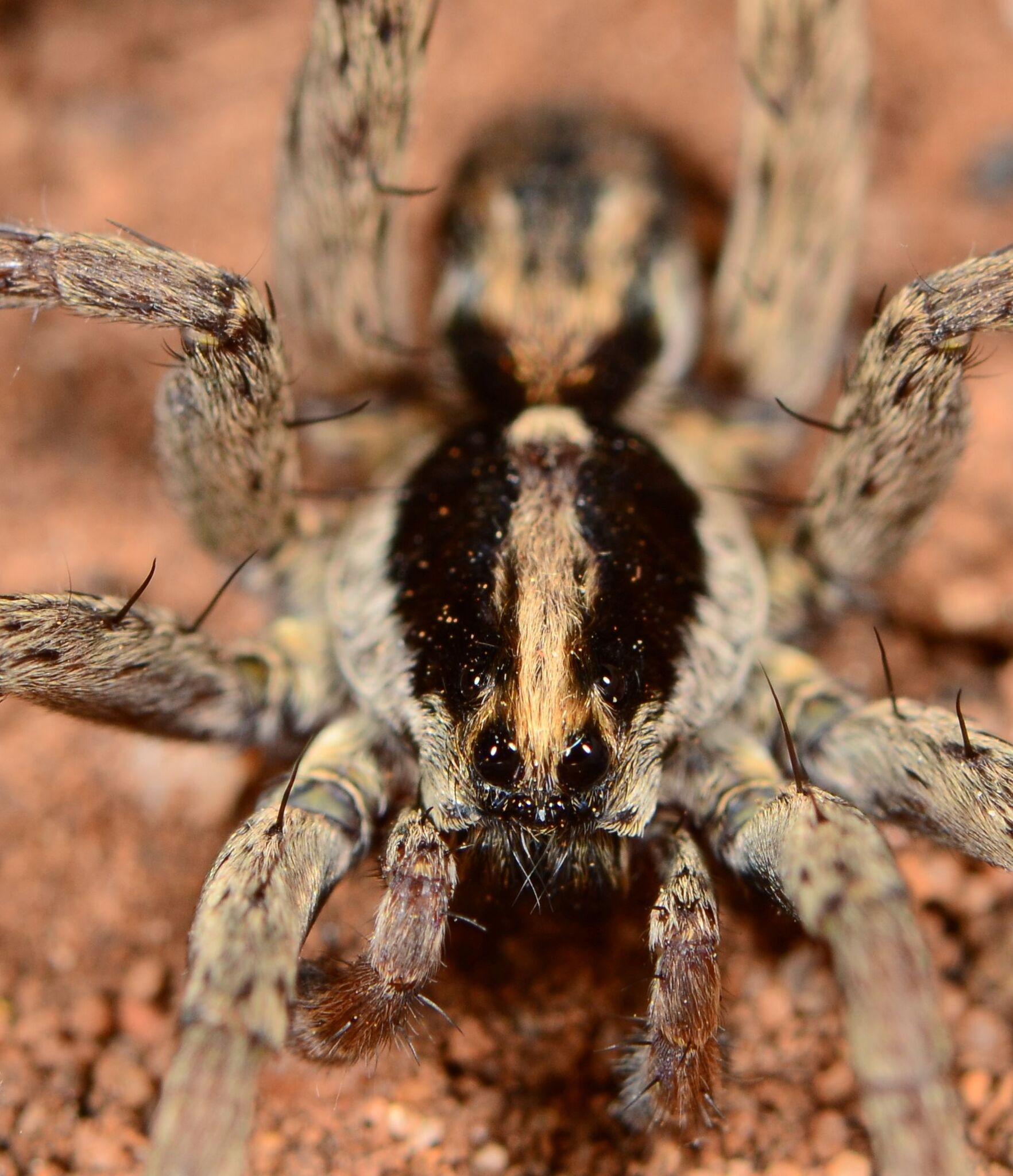
male

Hogna adjacens is described only from females.

The cephalothorax is brown without protruding stripes or rays and lacks side bands. It has a very narrow, tightly parallel-edged, rusty yellow median band between the eyes of the black eye field at its narrowest point. The surface of the cephalothorax is uniformly grey-white hairy in the remainder.

The abdomen is dorsally grey-brown with fine and dense yellowish speckles, bearing a slightly blackish median lancet band in front that is bordered on both sides by a pair of blackish spots at its middle and rear end. The sternum is uniformly black, with brown coxae each bearing a lighter basal spot. Other leg segments are uniformly rust-brown and not spotted. The chelicerae are black and grey hairy frontally.

== Conservation ==
The species is protected in Lekgalameetse Nature Reserve. Additional sampling is needed to collect males and determine the full geographic range.

== Taxonomy ==
The species was described by Roewer in 1959, with the holotype locality given as Kalahari. The paratype was collected in Kimberley, with both collections made prior to 1959.
