= Hogna deweti =

De Wet's burrow-living wolf spider

Scientific classification
- Kingdom: Animalia
- Phylum: Arthropoda
- Subphylum: Chelicerata
- Class: Arachnida
- Order: Araneae
- Infraorder: Araneomorphae
- Family: Lycosidae
- Genus: Hogna
- Species: H. deweti

Binomial name
- Hogna deweti Roewer, 1959

Species of spider

Hogna deweti is a species of spider in the family Lycosidae. It is endemic to South Africa and is commonly known as De Wet's burrow-living wolf spider.

== Distribution ==
Hogna deweti is known only from South Africa, with the type locality given simply as Karoo.

== Habitat and ecology ==
This species is a free-living ground dweller that lives in open burrows.

== Description ==
Hogna deweti is known only from males.

The cephalothorax is dark brown with a black eye field and a medially wavy marginal band. These three bands are sharp, pale yellow, and densely covered in white hair.

The abdomen is dorsally grey-brown, with a narrow, almost parallel-sided and broadly black-edged long mark at the anterior median in a light whitish-yellow field of the middle third. Behind this are four blackish median angular spots. The ventral abdomen is uniformly black. The sternum and coxae are rusty yellow in color.

== Conservation ==
The status of the species remains unclear. Additional sampling is needed to collect females and determine the full geographic range.
