= Hogna denisi =

Denis's burrow-living wolf spider

Scientific classification
- Kingdom: Animalia
- Phylum: Arthropoda
- Subphylum: Chelicerata
- Class: Arachnida
- Order: Araneae
- Infraorder: Araneomorphae
- Family: Lycosidae
- Genus: Hogna
- Species: H. denisi

Binomial name
- Hogna denisi Roewer, 1959

Species of spider

Hogna denisi is a species of spider in the family Lycosidae. It is endemic to South Africa and is commonly known as Denis's burrow-living wolf spider.

== Distribution ==
Hogna denisi is known only from the Western Cape province of South Africa, with the type locality given simply as "Capland".

== Habitat and ecology ==
This species is a free-living ground dweller that lives in open burrows. It has been sampled from the Fynbos biome.

== Description ==
Hogna denisi is known only from females.

The cephalothorax has a rusty yellow eye field with a medially wavy band and a pale yellow marginal band. The abdomen is dorsally clay-yellow, with a slightly dark, indicated median angular long band on the anterior two-thirds that is accompanied on both sides by two strong spots on each side. Ventrally, the epigyne, sternum, and coxae are pale yellow.

== Conservation ==
The status of the species remains unclear. Additional sampling is needed to collect males and determine the full geographic range.
