= Hogna unicolor =

Mozambique burrow-living wolf spider

Scientific classification
- Kingdom: Animalia
- Phylum: Arthropoda
- Subphylum: Chelicerata
- Class: Arachnida
- Order: Araneae
- Infraorder: Araneomorphae
- Family: Lycosidae
- Genus: Hogna
- Species: H. unicolor

Binomial name
- Hogna unicolor Roewer, 1959

Species of spider

Hogna unicolor is a species of spider in the family Lycosidae. It is found in southern Africa and is commonly known as the Mozambique burrow-living wolf spider.

== Distribution ==
Hogna unicolor is found in Mozambique and South Africa. In South Africa, it is recorded from Gauteng and the Western Cape provinces.

== Habitat and ecology ==
This species is a free-living ground dweller that lives in burrows that are open and not closed with a trapdoor. It has been sampled from the Grassland and Fynbos biomes at altitudes ranging from 63 to 1730 m.

== Description ==
Hogna unicolor is known from both sexes.

The cephalothorax is brown, turning uniformly black-brown towards the sides without any banding. The eye field is black.

The abdomen is dorsally evenly brown like the cephalothorax and hairy grey-white but without any markings. Ventrally, the sternum is completely black.

The legs are brown, with the third and especially fourth tibia ventral-apical and ventral-basal blackened. The chelicerae are dark brown.

== Conservation ==
Hogna unicolor has a large geographic range and is protected in Klipriviersberg Nature Reserve, Ezemvelo Nature Reserve, and Bontebok National Park.

== Etymology ==
The species name unicolor refers to the uniform, unmarked coloration of the spider.

== Taxonomy ==
Hogna unicolor was described by Roewer in 1959 from Mozambique.
