= Hogna infulata =

Port Elizabeth burrow-living wolf spider

Scientific classification
- Kingdom: Animalia
- Phylum: Arthropoda
- Subphylum: Chelicerata
- Class: Arachnida
- Order: Araneae
- Infraorder: Araneomorphae
- Family: Lycosidae
- Genus: Hogna
- Species: H. infulata

Binomial name
- Hogna infulata Roewer, 1959

Species of spider

Hogna infulata is a species of spider in the family Lycosidae. It is endemic to South Africa and is commonly known as the Port Elizabeth burrow-living wolf spider.

== Distribution ==
Hogna infulata is found only in Port Elizabeth in the Eastern Cape province of South Africa.

== Habitat and ecology ==
This species is a free-living ground dweller that lives in open burrows. It has been sampled from the Thicket and Fynbos biomes at an altitude of 7 m.

== Description ==
Hogna infulata is known from both sexes.

The cephalothorax is reddish brown with a black eye field, yellow medially straight marginal bands, and a yellow median band widened in front of the striae that is hairy white along its entire length.

The abdomen has a broad, pale yellow but abundantly black-speckled middle field along its entire length that is sharply demarcated from the blackish lateral areas. In front, it has a jagged black-brown median band. Ventrally, the area behind the pale yellow, uniformly colored epigaster is speckled.

The sternum is black-brown with a light wedge spot at the front median. The coxae are brown, each with a lighter basal spot, while the rest of the legs are red-brown.

== Conservation ==
The species is known only from the type locality with a limited range. Additional sampling is needed to determine the full geographic range.
