= Gulocosa =

Scientific classification
- Kingdom: Animalia
- Phylum: Arthropoda
- Subphylum: Chelicerata
- Class: Arachnida
- Order: Araneae
- Infraorder: Araneomorphae
- Family: Lycosidae
- Genus: Gulocosa
- Species: G. eskovi

Binomial name
- Gulocosa eskovi Marusik, Omelko & Koponen, 2015

Genus of spiders

Gulocosa is a genus of spiders in the family Lycosidae. It was first described in 2015 by Marusik, Omelko & Koponen. As of 2017, it contains only one species, the Russian species Gulocosa eskovi.
