= Hyaenosa =

Scientific classification
- Domain: Eukaryota
- Kingdom: Animalia
- Phylum: Arthropoda
- Subphylum: Chelicerata
- Class: Arachnida
- Order: Araneae
- Infraorder: Araneomorphae
- Family: Lycosidae
- Genus: Hyaenosa; Caporiacco

Species
- Hyaenosa clarki (Hogg, 1912); Hyaenosa effera (O. Pickard-Cambridge, 1872); Hyaenosa invasa Savelyeva, 1972; Hyaenosa ruandana Roewer, 1960; Hyaenosa strandi Caporiacco, 1940

Genus of spiders

Hyaenosa is a genus of spiders in the family Lycosidae. It was first described in 1940 by Caporiacco. As of 2017, it contains 5 species.
