= Venonia =

Scientific classification
- Kingdom: Animalia
- Phylum: Arthropoda
- Subphylum: Chelicerata
- Class: Arachnida
- Order: Araneae
- Infraorder: Araneomorphae
- Family: Lycosidae
- Genus: Venonia; Thorell

Species
- 16, see text

Genus of spiders

Venonia is a genus of spiders in the family Lycosidae. It was first described in 1894 by Thorell. As of 2017, it contains 16 species.

== Species ==
Venonia comprises the following species:

- Venonia chaiwooi Yoo & Framenau, 2006
- Venonia choiae Yoo & Framenau, 2006
- Venonia cinctipes (Simon, 1898)
- Venonia coruscans Thorell, 1894
- Venonia infundibulum Yoo & Framenau, 2006
- Venonia joejim Yoo & Framenau, 2006
- Venonia kimjoopili Yoo & Framenau, 2006
- Venonia kokoda Lehtinen & Hippa, 1979
- Venonia micans (Simon, 1898)
- Venonia micarioides (L. Koch, 1877)
- Venonia milla Lehtinen & Hippa, 1979
- Venonia muju (Chrysanthus, 1967)
- Venonia nata Yoo & Framenau, 2006
- Venonia spirocysta Chai, 1991
- Venonia sungahae Yoo & Framenau, 2006
- Venonia vilkkii Lehtinen & Hippa, 1979
