= Malimbosa =

Scientific classification
- Kingdom: Animalia
- Phylum: Arthropoda
- Subphylum: Chelicerata
- Class: Arachnida
- Order: Araneae
- Infraorder: Araneomorphae
- Family: Lycosidae
- Genus: Malimbosa; Roewer

Species
- Malimbosa lamperti (Strand, 1906)

Genus of spiders

Malimbosa is a genus of spiders in the family Lycosidae. It was first described in 1960 by Roewer. As of 2017, it contains only one west African species, Malimbosa lamperti.
