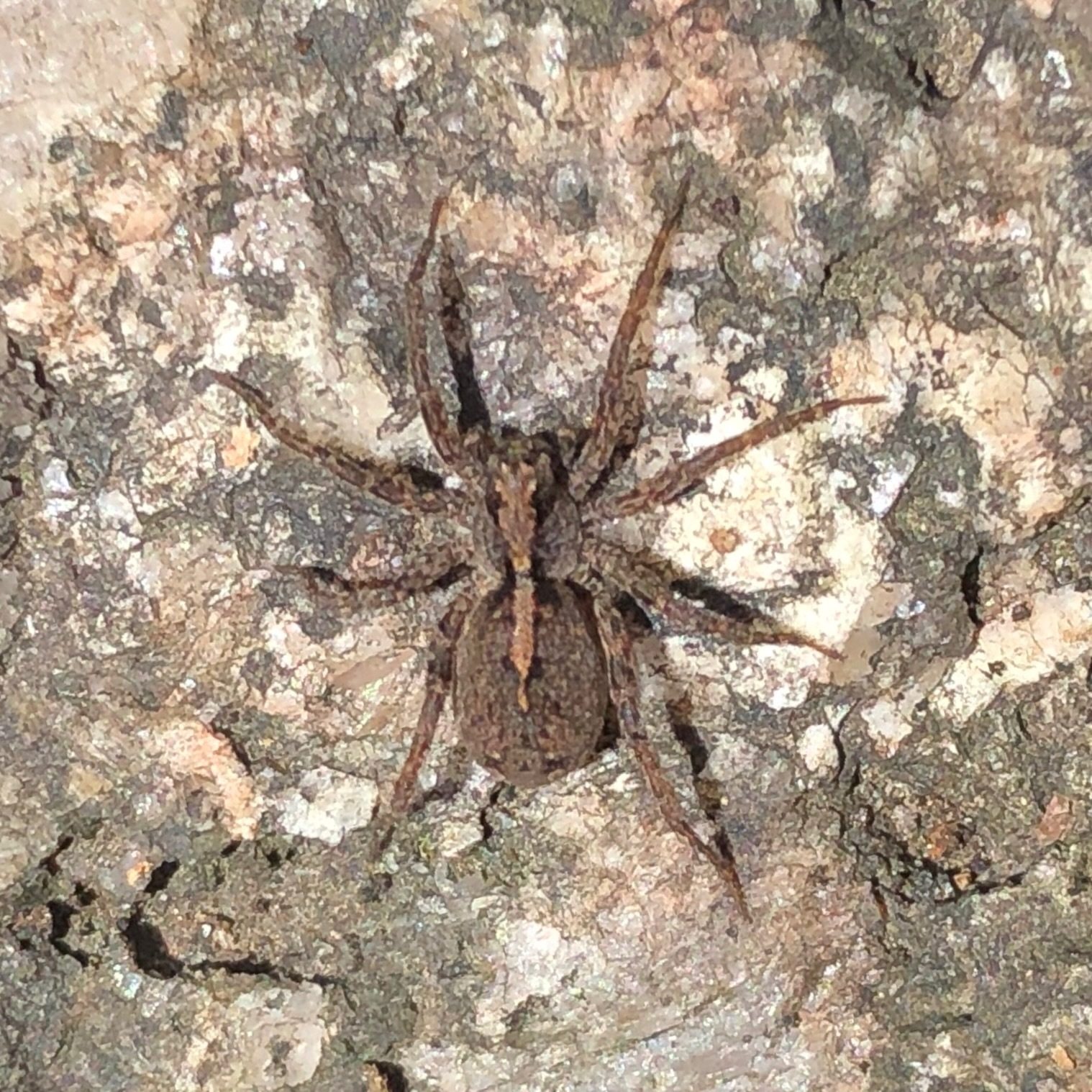
- female Kochosa sp. in NSW
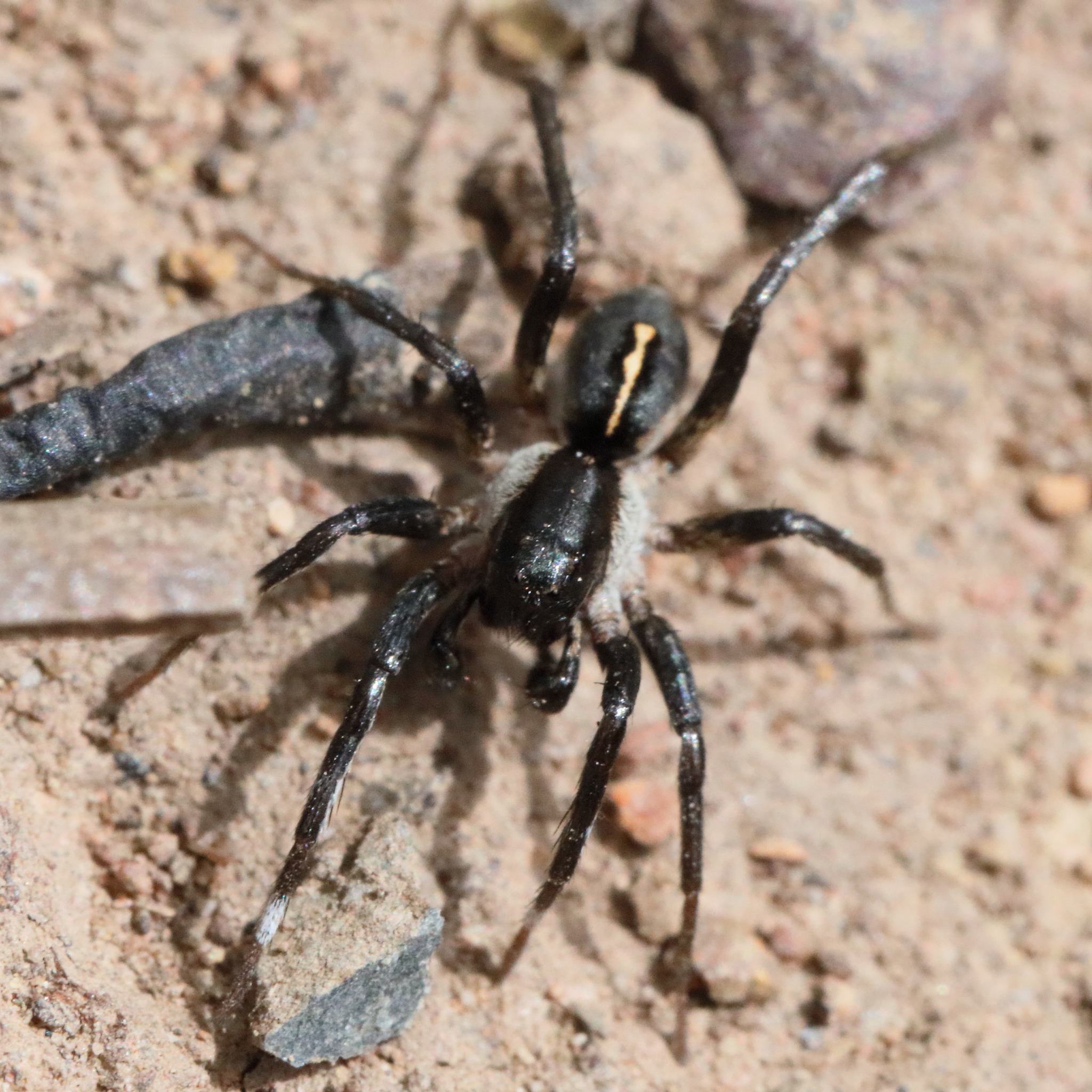
- male Kochosa sp. in NSW

Scientific classification
- Kingdom: Animalia
- Phylum: Arthropoda
- Subphylum: Chelicerata
- Class: Arachnida
- Order: Araneae
- Infraorder: Araneomorphae
- Family: Lycosidae
- Subfamily: Artoriinae
- Genus: Kochosa; Framenau, Castanheira & Yoo, 2023

Type species
- K. australia Framenau, Castanheira & Yoo, 2023

Species
- 16, see text

= Kochosa =

Genus of spiders

Kochosa is a genus of spiders in the family Lycosidae (wolf spiders).

== Distribution ==
Kochosa is endemic to Australia, with species distributed across all mainland states and Tasmania.

== Etymology ==
The genus name honors both Carl Ludwig Koch (1778–1857) and his son Ludwig Koch (1825–1908) for their contribution to Australian arachnology.

== Species ==
As of January 2026, this genus includes sixteen species:

- Kochosa aero Framenau, Castanheira & Yoo, 2023 – Australia (Western Australia)
- Kochosa asterix Framenau, Castanheira & Yoo, 2023 – Australia (Queensland, New South Wales, Victoria, Tasmania)
- Kochosa australia Framenau, Castanheira & Yoo, 2023 – Australia (Western Australia, South Australia, Queensland, New South Wales, Victoria)
- Kochosa confusa Framenau, Castanheira & Yoo, 2023 – Australia (Queensland)
- Kochosa erratum Framenau, Castanheira & Yoo, 2023 – Australia (Queensland)
- Kochosa fleurae Framenau, Castanheira & Yoo, 2023 – Australia (Victoria)
- Kochosa mendum Framenau, Castanheira & Yoo, 2023 – Australia (Queensland, New South Wales, Capital Territory)
- Kochosa nigra Framenau, Castanheira & Yoo, 2023 – Australia (Queensland)
- Kochosa obelix Framenau, Castanheira & Yoo, 2023 – Australia (Western Australia)
- Kochosa queenslandica Framenau, Castanheira & Yoo, 2023 – Australia (Queensland)
- Kochosa sharae Framenau, Castanheira & Yoo, 2023 – Australia (South Australia)
- Kochosa tanakai Framenau, Castanheira & Yoo, 2023 – Australia (Queensland, New South Wales)
- Kochosa tasmaniensis Framenau, Castanheira & Yoo, 2023 – Australia (Tasmania)
- Kochosa timwintoni Framenau, Castanheira & Yoo, 2023 – Australia (Western Australia)
- Kochosa tongiorgii Framenau, Castanheira & Yoo, 2023 – Australia (Queensland)
- Kochosa westralia Framenau, Castanheira & Yoo, 2023 – Australia (Western Australia)
