= Asiacosa =

Scientific classification
- Kingdom: Animalia
- Phylum: Arthropoda
- Subphylum: Chelicerata
- Class: Arachnida
- Order: Araneae
- Infraorder: Araneomorphae
- Family: Lycosidae
- Genus: Asiacosa; Logunov, 2023

Type species
- Lycosa asiatica Sytshevskaja, 1980

Species
- 5, see text

Genus of spiders

Asiacosa is a genus of spiders in the family Lycosidae.

== Distribution ==
Asiacosa occurs across Central Asia, with one species endemic to Egypt.

== Etymology ==
The genus name is a combination of Asia and the common lycosid genus ending "-cosa".

== Species ==
As of January 2026, this genus includes five species:

- Asiacosa ambigua (Denis, 1947) – Egypt
- Asiacosa babatagh Logunov, 2023 – Uzbekistan
- Asiacosa krivokhatskyi Logunov, 2025 – Turkmenistan
- Asiacosa kulagini (Spassky, 1941) – Tajikistan
- Asiacosa ovchinnikovi Logunov, 2025 – Tajikistan
