= Prolycosides =

Scientific classification
- Kingdom: Animalia
- Phylum: Arthropoda
- Subphylum: Chelicerata
- Class: Arachnida
- Order: Araneae
- Infraorder: Araneomorphae
- Family: Lycosidae
- Genus: Prolycosides
- Species: P. amblygyna

Binomial name
- Prolycosides amblygyna (Mello-Leitão, 1942)

Genus of spiders

Prolycosides is a genus of spiders in the family Lycosidae. It was first described in 1942 by Mello-Leitão. As of 2017, it contains only one species, Prolycosides amblygyna, found in Argentina.
