= Halocosa =

Scientific classification
- Kingdom: Animalia
- Phylum: Arthropoda
- Subphylum: Chelicerata
- Class: Arachnida
- Order: Araneae
- Infraorder: Araneomorphae
- Family: Lycosidae
- Genus: Halocosa; Azarkina & Trilikauskas, 2019

Type species
- Lycosa cereipes (L. Koch, 1878)

Species
- Halocosa cereipes (L. Koch, 1878); Halocosa hatanensis (Urita, Tang & Song, 1993)

Genus of wolf spiders

Halocosa is a genus of wolf spiders first described by G. N. Azarkina and L. A. Trilikauskas in 2019. As of December 2021 it contains only three species: H. cereipes, H. hatanensis, and H. jartica. The type species, Halocosa cereipes, was originally described under the name "Lycosa cereipes".

== See also ==
- Evippa
- Pardosa
- Lycosa
- Pirata
