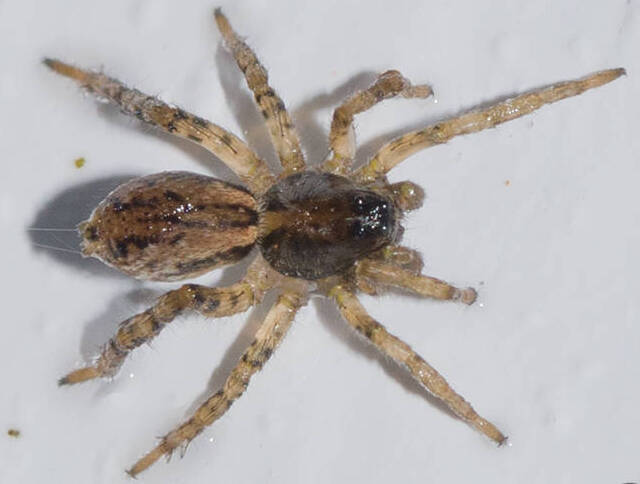
- A. nanica in Argentina
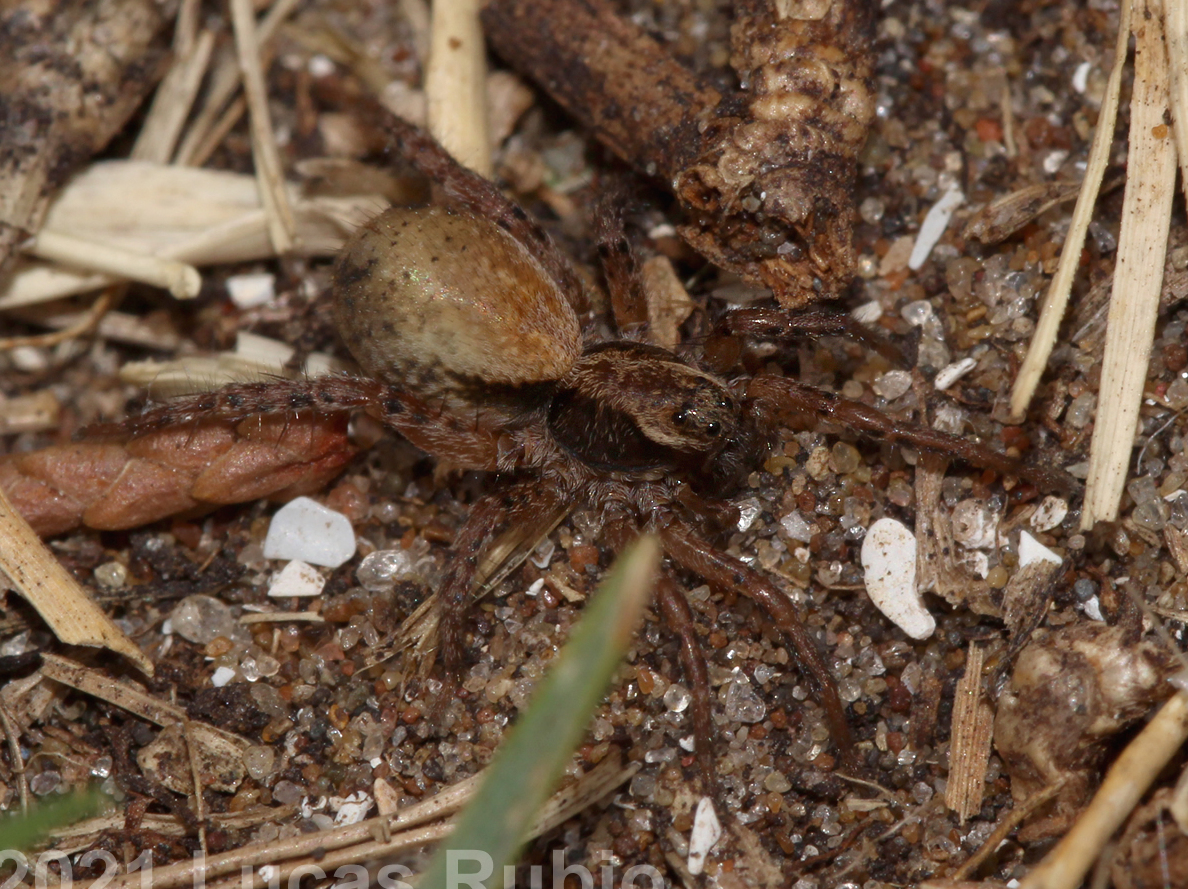
- A. paraguensis in Argentina

Scientific classification
- Kingdom: Animalia
- Phylum: Arthropoda
- Subphylum: Chelicerata
- Class: Arachnida
- Order: Araneae
- Infraorder: Araneomorphae
- Family: Lycosidae
- Subfamily: Allocosinae
- Genus: Abaycosa; Laborda, Bidegaray-Batista, Simó, Brescovit, Beloso & Piacentini, 2022

Type species
- Pardosa nanica Mello-Leitão, 1941

Species
- 2, see text

= Abaycosa =

Genus of spiders

Abaycosa is a genus of spiders in the family Lycosidae (wolf spiders).

== Distribution ==
Abaycosa is found in South America, from Brazil to Argentina.

== Etymology ==
The genus name is a combination of "Abáy" and the common lycosid ending "-cosa". "Abáy" mens "spider" in the indigenous Chaná language that is spoken in the basins of the Paraná and Uruguay rivers.

== Species ==
As of January 2026, this genus includes two species:

- Abaycosa nanica (Mello-Leitão, 1941) – Bolivia, Brazil, Paraguay, Uruguay, Argentina
- Abaycosa paraguensis (Gertsch & Wallace, 1937) – Paraguay, Uruguay, Argentina
