= Costacosa =

Scientific classification
- Kingdom: Animalia
- Phylum: Arthropoda
- Subphylum: Chelicerata
- Class: Arachnida
- Order: Araneae
- Infraorder: Araneomorphae
- Family: Lycosidae
- Genus: Costacosa; Leung

Species
- Costacosa dondalei Framenau & Leung, 2013; Costacosa torbjorni Framenau & Leung, 2013

Genus of spiders

Costacosa is a genus of spiders in the family Lycosidae. It was first described in 2013 by Framenau & Leung. As of 2017, it contains 2 species, both from western Australia.
