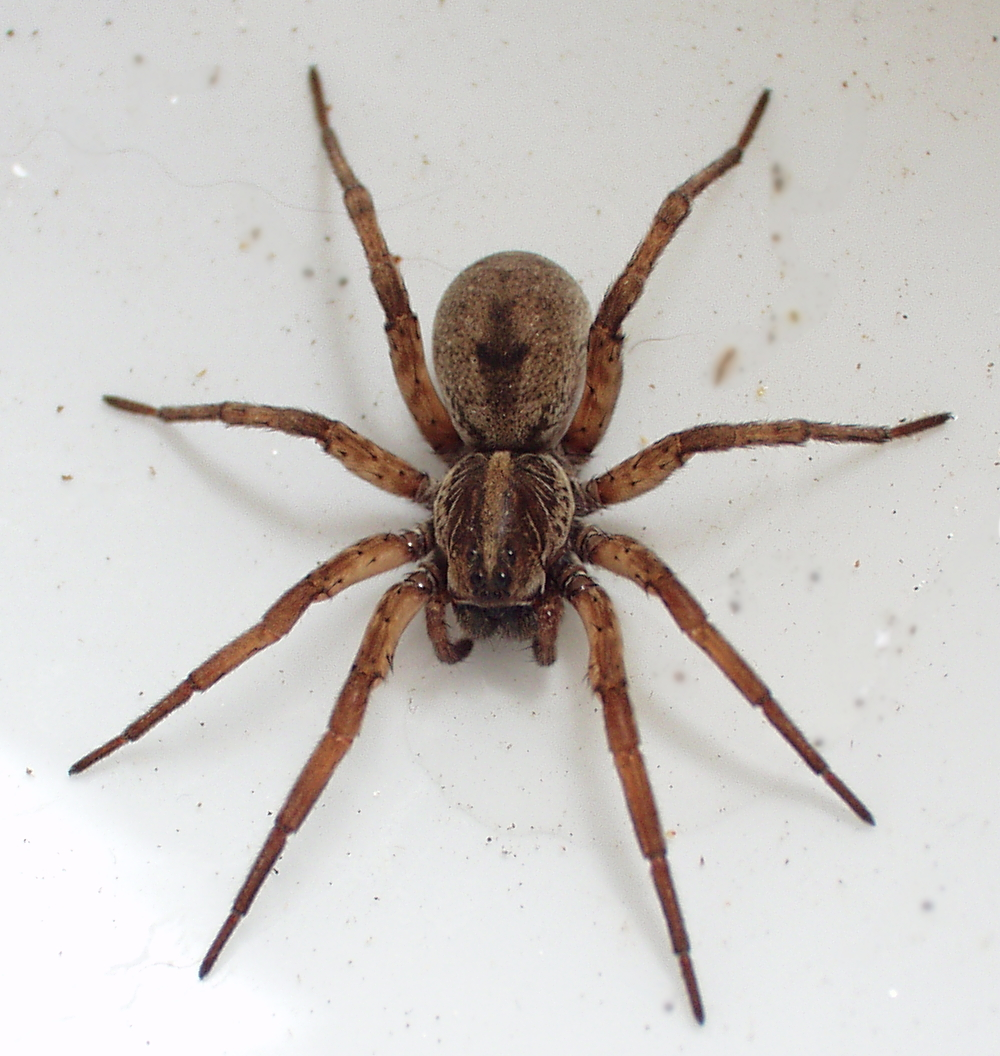

Scientific classification
- Kingdom: Animalia
- Phylum: Arthropoda
- Subphylum: Chelicerata
- Class: Arachnida
- Order: Araneae
- Infraorder: Araneomorphae
- Family: Lycosidae
- Genus: Hogna
- Species: H. lenta

Binomial name
- Hogna lenta (Hentz, 1844)

= Hogna lenta =

Species of spider

Hogna lenta, commonly referred to as the field wolf spider, is a species of wolf spider native to the southeastern United States.

== Diet ==
Hogna lenta primarily eat small insects, such as crickets, waxworms, and mealworms. If the preferred prey is not available, they will eat beetles. As with most ground spiders, they primarily hunt from their burrows, using vibrations to locate prey. They possess a neurotoxic venom, paralyzing their prey to enable feeding.

== Natural defenses ==
Hogna lenta is naturally equipped with a venom powerful enough to paralyze a small insect. This venom poses no threat to a healthy adult human, often reported to feel like a bee sting. They generally raise their front legs in the air when threatened to look bigger. If this does not work, they will lunge right in front of their attacker to startle them. Their last defense is biting the attacker. Mature members of this species have been observed to be 10-30 mm in length.

== Habitat ==
H. lenta occupy a variety of habitats but are commonly found in sandy sediments. Burrows produced by H. lenta are vertical shafts that may contain a turret. A thick layer of silk and sediment may be used as a trap door.

== Lifestyle ==
Shortly after mating (between 1–2 weeks), the female constructs a large white egg sac bigger than its abdomen containing many eggs. They carry the egg sac on the spinnerets on their abdomen. Spiderlings grow slowly inside the eggs for 5–8 weeks, before finally hatching. When emerged from an egg sac, they are hardly visible, about the size of a small LED light. They stay on the mother's abdomen for about 1–4 weeks. When ready, they climb off and run off into the wild. When small, they are extremely agile, making them hard to catch. Many of the young spiders die off within a few days of leaving the mother's back. If they live a few weeks, they molt. This is a process of shedding their old skin. Spiders molt their old skin, as their new skin is malleable. They grow while the new skin is soft, than repeat the process. Young spiders can molt up to three times a month.
