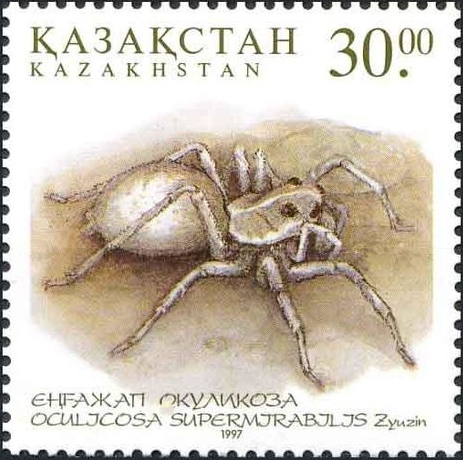
- Oculicosa supermirabilis on a 1997 stamp of Kazakhstan

Scientific classification
- Kingdom: Animalia
- Phylum: Arthropoda
- Subphylum: Chelicerata
- Class: Arachnida
- Order: Araneae
- Infraorder: Araneomorphae
- Family: Lycosidae
- Genus: Oculicosa
- Species: O. supermirabilis

Binomial name
- Oculicosa supermirabilis Zyuzin, 1993

= Oculicosa =

Genus of spiders

Oculicosa is a genus of spiders in the family Lycosidae. It was first described in 1993 by Zyuzin. As of 2017, it contains only one species, Oculicosa supermirabilis, found in Central Asia (Kazakhstan, Uzbekistan, and Turkmenistan).
