= Caspicosa =

Scientific classification
- Kingdom: Animalia
- Phylum: Arthropoda
- Subphylum: Chelicerata
- Class: Arachnida
- Order: Araneae
- Infraorder: Araneomorphae
- Family: Lycosidae
- Genus: Caspicosa; Ponomarev

Species
- Caspicosa kulsaryensis Ponomarev, 2007; Caspicosa manytchensis Ponomarev, 2007

Genus of spiders

Caspicosa is a genus of spiders in the family Lycosidae. It was first described in 2007 by Ponomarev. As of 2017, it contains 2 species.
