= Deliriosa =

Scientific classification
- Kingdom: Animalia
- Phylum: Arthropoda
- Subphylum: Chelicerata
- Class: Arachnida
- Order: Araneae
- Infraorder: Araneomorphae
- Family: Lycosidae
- Genus: Deliriosa
- Species: D. chiragrica

Binomial name
- Deliriosa chiragrica (Thorell, 1875)

Genus of spiders

Deliriosa is a genus of spiders in the family Lycosidae. It was first described in 2009 by Kovblyuk. As of 2017, it contains only one species, Deliriosa chiragrica, found in Ukraine.
