= Sinacosa =

Scientific classification
- Kingdom: Animalia
- Phylum: Arthropoda
- Subphylum: Chelicerata
- Class: Arachnida
- Order: Araneae
- Infraorder: Araneomorphae
- Family: Lycosidae
- Subfamily: Evippinae
- Genus: Sinacosa; Wang, Lu & Zhang, 2023

Type species
- S. gaoi Wang, Lu & Zhang, 2023

Species
- 2, see text

Genus of spiders

Sinacosa is a genus of trapdoor-building wolf spiders in the family Lycosidae.

It is the first trapdoor-building wolf spider reported from outside Australia. The genus resembles Xerolycosa.

== Distribution ==
Sinacosa is endemic to China.

S. gaoi has been described from Guangxi Zhuang Autonomous Region, Yunnan Province. S. nangunheensis is known from Yunnan.

== Etymology ==
The genus name is a combination of "sina" ("China") and the common wolf spider genus ending "-cosa".

== Species ==
As of January 2026, this genus includes two species:

- Sinacosa gaoi Wang, Lu & Zhang, 2023 – China
- Sinacosa nangunheensis Wang, Yang & Zhang, 2025 – China
