= Pardosella =

Scientific classification
- Kingdom: Animalia
- Phylum: Arthropoda
- Subphylum: Chelicerata
- Class: Arachnida
- Order: Araneae
- Infraorder: Araneomorphae
- Family: Lycosidae
- Genus: Pardosella; Caporiacco

Species
- Pardosella delesserti Caporiacco, 1939; Pardosella maculata Caporiacco, 1941; Pardosella massaiensis Roewer, 1959; Pardosella tabora Roewer, 1959; Pardosella zavattarii Caporiacco, 1939

Genus of spiders

Pardosella is a genus of spiders in the family Lycosidae. It was first described in 1939 by Caporiacco. As of 2017, it contains five species from Ethiopia and Tanzania.
