= Shapna =

Scientific classification
- Kingdom: Animalia
- Phylum: Arthropoda
- Subphylum: Chelicerata
- Class: Arachnida
- Order: Araneae
- Infraorder: Araneomorphae
- Family: Lycosidae
- Genus: Shapna
- Species: S. pluvialis

Binomial name
- Shapna pluvialis Hippa & Lehtinen, 1983

Genus of spiders

Shapna is a genus of spiders in the family Lycosidae. It was first described in 1983 by Hippa & Lehtinen. As of 2017, it contains only one species, Shapna pluvialis, found in India.
