= Dorjulopirata =

Scientific classification
- Kingdom: Animalia
- Phylum: Arthropoda
- Subphylum: Chelicerata
- Class: Arachnida
- Order: Araneae
- Infraorder: Araneomorphae
- Family: Lycosidae
- Genus: Dorjulopirata
- Species: D. dorjulanus

Binomial name
- Dorjulopirata dorjulanus Buchar, 1997

Genus of spiders

Dorjulopirata is a genus of spiders in the family Lycosidae. It was first described in 1997 by Buchar. As of 2017, it contains only one species, Dorjulopirata dorjulanus, found in Bhutan.
