= Mustelicosa =

Scientific classification
- Kingdom: Animalia
- Phylum: Arthropoda
- Subphylum: Chelicerata
- Class: Arachnida
- Order: Araneae
- Infraorder: Araneomorphae
- Family: Lycosidae
- Genus: Mustelicosa; Roewer

Species
- Mustelicosa dimidiata (Thorell, 1875); Mustelicosa ordosa (Hogg, 1912)

Genus of spiders

Mustelicosa is a genus of spiders in the family Lycosidae. It was first described in 1960 by Roewer. As of 2017, it contains 2 species.
