= Phonophilus =

Scientific classification
- Kingdom: Animalia
- Phylum: Arthropoda
- Subphylum: Chelicerata
- Class: Arachnida
- Order: Araneae
- Infraorder: Araneomorphae
- Family: Lycosidae
- Genus: Phonophilus
- Species: P. portentosus

Binomial name
- Phonophilus portentosus Ehrenberg, 1831

Genus of spiders

Phonophilus is a genus of spiders in the family Lycosidae. It was first described in 1831 by Ehrenberg. As of 2017, it contains only one species, Phonophilus portentosus, found in North Africa (in Libya).

As of January 2026, this genus is considered a nomen dubium.
