= Sinartoria =

Scientific classification
- Kingdom: Animalia
- Phylum: Arthropoda
- Subphylum: Chelicerata
- Class: Arachnida
- Order: Araneae
- Infraorder: Araneomorphae
- Family: Lycosidae
- Genus: Sinartoria; Wang, Framenau & Zhang, 2021

Type species
- S. damingshanensis Wang, Framenau & Zhang, 2021

Species
- Sinartoria damingshanensis Wang, Framenau & Zhang, 2021; Sinartoria zhuangia Wang, Framenau & Zhang, 2021

Genus of wolf spiders

Sinartoria is a small genus of east Asian wolf spiders. It was first described by L. Y. Wang, V. W. Framenau and Z. S. Zhang in 2021, and it has only been found in China. As of January 2022 it contains only two species: S. damingshanensis and S. zhuangia.
