= Serratacosa =

Scientific classification
- Kingdom: Animalia
- Phylum: Arthropoda
- Subphylum: Chelicerata
- Class: Arachnida
- Order: Araneae
- Infraorder: Araneomorphae
- Family: Lycosidae
- Genus: Serratacosa; Wang, Peng & Zhang, 2021

Type species
- S. medogensis Wang, Peng & Zhang, 2021

Species
- Serratacosa himalayensis (Gravely, 1924); Serratacosa medogensis Wang, Peng & Zhang, 2021; Serratacosa multidontata (Qu, Peng & Yin, 2010)

Genus of wolf spiders

Serratacosa is a genus of wolf spiders. It was first described by L. Y. Wang, X. J. Peng and Z. S. Zhang in 2021, and it has only been found in China. As of January 2022 it contains only three species: S. himalayensis, S. medogensis, and S. multidontata.

== See also ==
- Lycosa
- Hogna
- Pardosa
