= Orinocosa =

Scientific classification
- Kingdom: Animalia
- Phylum: Arthropoda
- Subphylum: Chelicerata
- Class: Arachnida
- Order: Araneae
- Infraorder: Araneomorphae
- Family: Lycosidae
- Genus: Orinocosa; Chamberlin

Species
- 9, see text

Genus of spiders

Orinocosa is a genus of spiders in the family Lycosidae. It was first described in 1916 by Chamberlin. As of 2017, it contains 9 species.

== Species ==
Orinocosa comprises the following species:

- Orinocosa aymara Chamberlin, 1916
- Orinocosa celerierae Cornic, 1976
- Orinocosa guentheri (Pocock, 1899)
- Orinocosa hansi (Strand, 1916)
- Orinocosa paraguensis (Gertsch & Wallace, 1937)
- Orinocosa priesneri Roewer, 1959
- Orinocosa pulchra Caporiacco, 1947
- Orinocosa securifer (Tullgren, 1905)
- Orinocosa tropica Roewer, 1959
