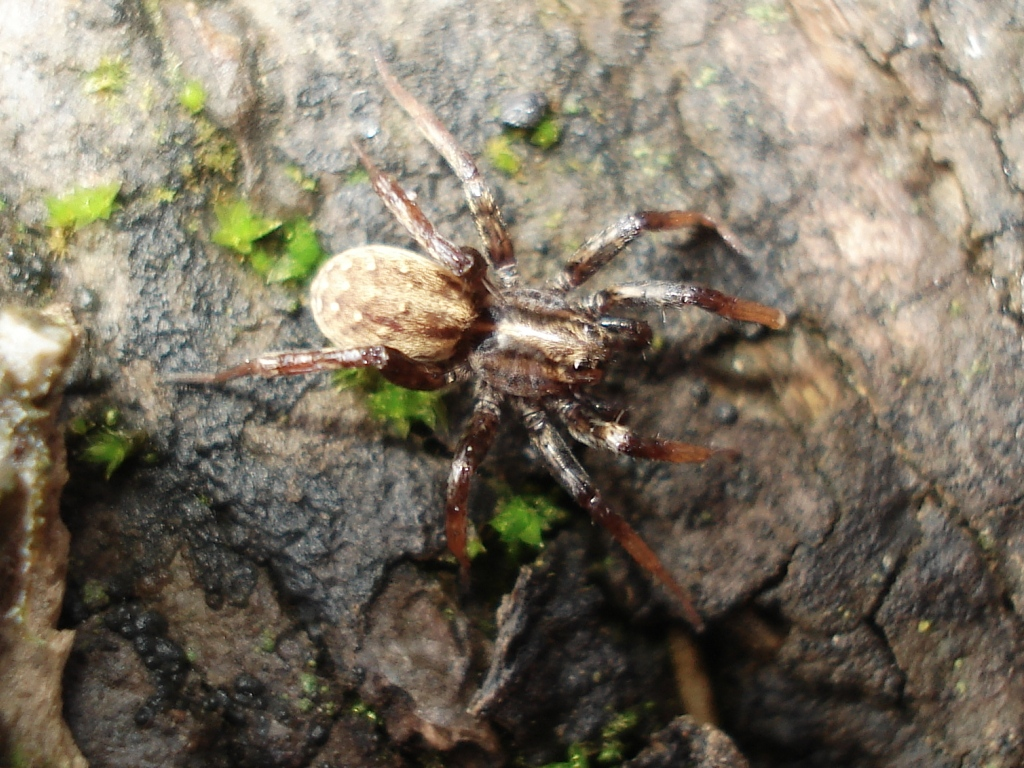
- H. rubrofasciata

Scientific classification
- Kingdom: Animalia
- Phylum: Arthropoda
- Subphylum: Chelicerata
- Class: Arachnida
- Order: Araneae
- Infraorder: Araneomorphae
- Family: Lycosidae
- Genus: Hygrolycosa; Dahl, 1908

Species
- See text.

Synonyms
- Hydrolycosa

= Hygrolycosa =

Genus of spiders

Hygrolycosa is a genus of wolf spiders (family Lycosidae) first described by Friedrich Dahl in 1908.

== Species ==
As of October 2020, it contains only five species.

- Hygrolycosa alpigena Yu & Song, 1988 – China
- Hygrolycosa rubrofasciata (Ohlert, 1865) – Palearctic
- Hygrolycosa strandi Caporiacco, 1948 – Greece
- Hygrolycosa tokunagai Saito, 1936 – China
- Hygrolycosa umidicola Tanaka, 1978 – "Japan, Korea?"
