= Lynxosa =

Scientific classification
- Kingdom: Animalia
- Phylum: Arthropoda
- Subphylum: Chelicerata
- Class: Arachnida
- Order: Araneae
- Infraorder: Araneomorphae
- Family: Lycosidae
- Genus: Lynxosa; Roewer, 1960

Type species
- Lycosa inexorabilis O. Pickard-Cambridge, 1869

Species
- 4, see text

Genus of spiders

Lynxosa is a genus of spiders in the family Lycosidae.

== Distribution ==
All four described species are endemic to St. Helena in the South Atlantic Ocean.

== Taxonomy ==
This genus was removed from Hogna Simon, 1885 in 2024.

== Species ==
As of January 2026, this genus includes four species:

- Lynxosa inexorabilis (O. Pickard-Cambridge, 1870) – St. Helena
- Lynxosa ligata (O. Pickard-Cambridge, 1870) – St. Helena
- Lynxosa nefasta (Tongiorgi, 1977) – St. Helena
- Lynxosa veseyensis (Sherwood, Henrard, Logunov & Fowler, 2023) – St. Helena
