= Houcosa =

Scientific classification
- Kingdom: Animalia
- Phylum: Arthropoda
- Subphylum: Chelicerata
- Class: Arachnida
- Order: Araneae
- Infraorder: Araneomorphae
- Family: Lycosidae
- Genus: Houcosa; Wang, Marusik & Zhang, 2025
- Species: H. zhaoi

Binomial name
- Houcosa zhaoi Wang, Marusik & Zhang, 2025

Species of spider

Houcosa is a monotypic genus of spiders in the family Lycosidae containing the single species, Houcosa zhaoi.

== Etymology ==
The genus name is a combination of 犼; hǒu (from the ancient mythical creature Golden-Haired Hou) and the common ending for wolf spider genera "-cosa". The species is named after Mr Wenqi Zhao (赵文琪; Zhào Wénqí), who collected it.

The common names in Chinese are 犼蛛属; hǒuzhūshǔ for the genus, and 赵氏犼蛛; zhàoshì lángzhū.

== Distribution ==
Houcosa zhaoi has only been recorded from Guangxi in China.
