= Antembolus =

Scientific classification
- Kingdom: Animalia
- Phylum: Arthropoda
- Subphylum: Chelicerata
- Class: Arachnida
- Order: Araneae
- Infraorder: Araneomorphae
- Family: Lycosidae
- Genus: Antembolus; Sherwood, Henrard, Logunov & Fowler, 2023

Type species
- Lycosa elysae Tongiorgi, 1977

Species
- 2, see text

Genus of spiders

Antembolus is a genus of spiders in the family Lycosidae (wolf spiders).

== Distribution ==
Antembolus is endemic to St. Helena, where two species have been recorded. A. elysae is only known from Prosperous Bay Plain, where it was recorded in 1967. A. ringens is only known from Haute Fisher's Valley, where it was collected in 1965.

== Description ==
The genus is only known from male specimens. A. elysae has a body length of 8 mm, A. ringens around 4 mm.

== Etymology ==
The genus name is a combination of "anterior" and "embolus".

== Species ==
As of January 2026, this genus includes two species:

- Antembolus elysae (Tongiorgi, 1977) – St. Helena
- Antembolus ringens (Tongiorgi, 1977) – St. Helena
