= Hippasella =

Scientific classification
- Kingdom: Animalia
- Phylum: Arthropoda
- Subphylum: Chelicerata
- Class: Arachnida
- Order: Araneae
- Infraorder: Araneomorphae
- Family: Lycosidae
- Genus: Hippasella; Mello-Leitão

Species
- Hippasella alhue Piacentini, 2011; Hippasella arapensis (Strand, 1908); Hippasella guaquiensis (Strand, 1908)

Genus of spiders

Hippasella is a genus of spiders in the family Lycosidae. It was first described in 1944 by Mello-Leitão. As of 2017, it contained three South American species.
