= Bristowiella =

Scientific classification
- Kingdom: Animalia
- Phylum: Arthropoda
- Subphylum: Chelicerata
- Class: Arachnida
- Order: Araneae
- Infraorder: Araneomorphae
- Family: Lycosidae
- Genus: Bristowiella; Saaristo

Species
- Bristowiella kartalensis Alderweireldt, 1988 - Comoro Islands; Bristowiella seychellensis (Bristowe, 1973) - Seychelles, Aldabra, Comoro Is.

Genus of spiders

Bristowiella is a genus of spiders in the family Lycosidae. It was first described in 1980 by Saaristo. As of 2017, it contains 2 species.
