= Paratrochosina =

Scientific classification
- Kingdom: Animalia
- Phylum: Arthropoda
- Subphylum: Chelicerata
- Class: Arachnida
- Order: Araneae
- Infraorder: Araneomorphae
- Family: Lycosidae
- Genus: Paratrochosina; Roewer

Species
- Paratrochosina amica (Mello-Leitão, 1941); Paratrochosina insolita (L. Koch, 1879); Paratrochosina sagittigera (Roewer, 1951)

Genus of spiders

Paratrochosina is a genus of spiders in the family Lycosidae. It was first described in 1960 by Roewer.

== Species ==
As of October 2025, this genus includes three species:

- Paratrochosina amica (Mello-Leitão, 1941) – Argentina
- Paratrochosina insolita (L. Koch, 1879) – Russia (West Siberia) (type species)
- Paratrochosina sagittigera (Roewer, 1951) – Russia (Middle Siberia)
