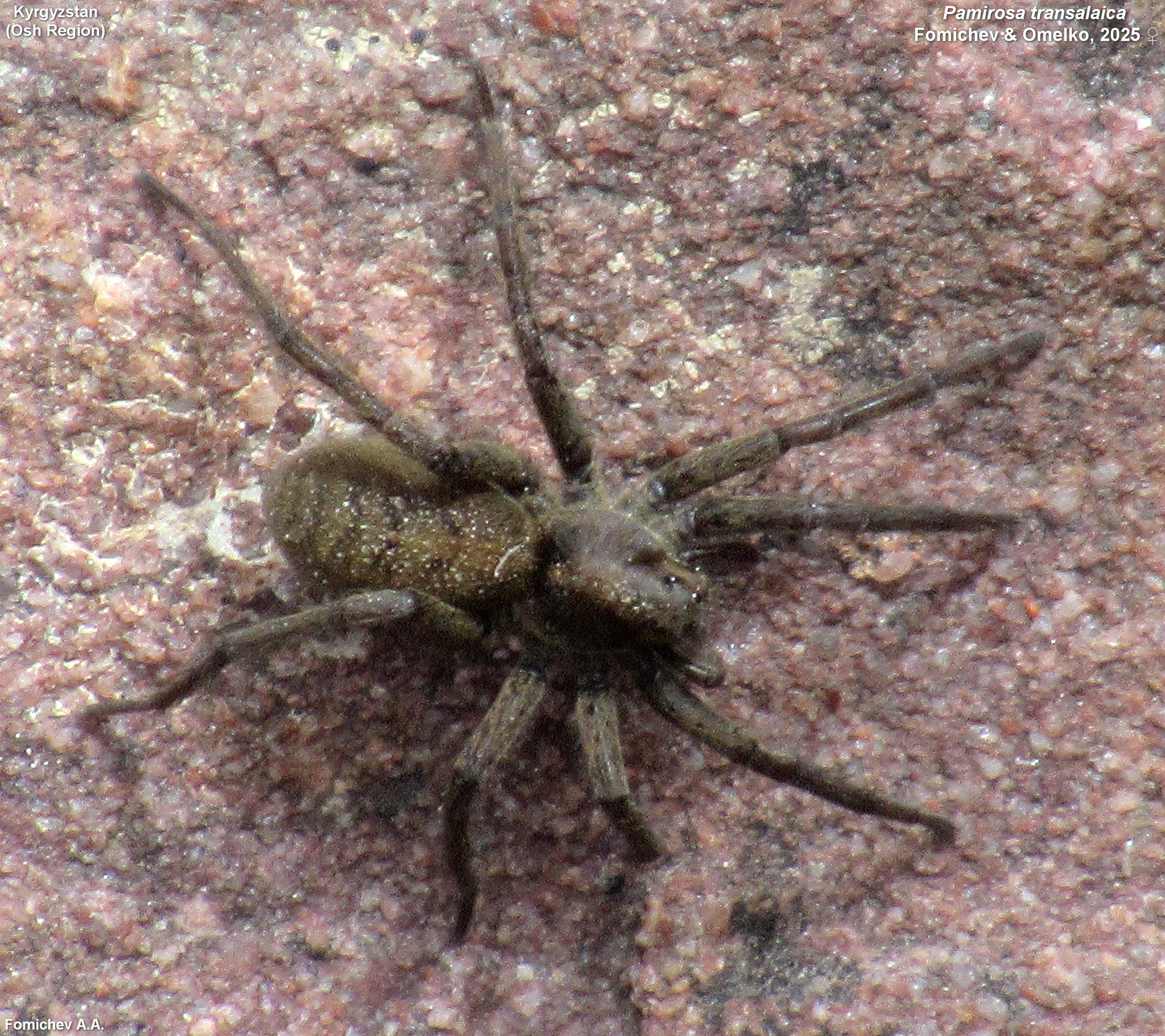
- female P. transalaica in Kyrgyzstan
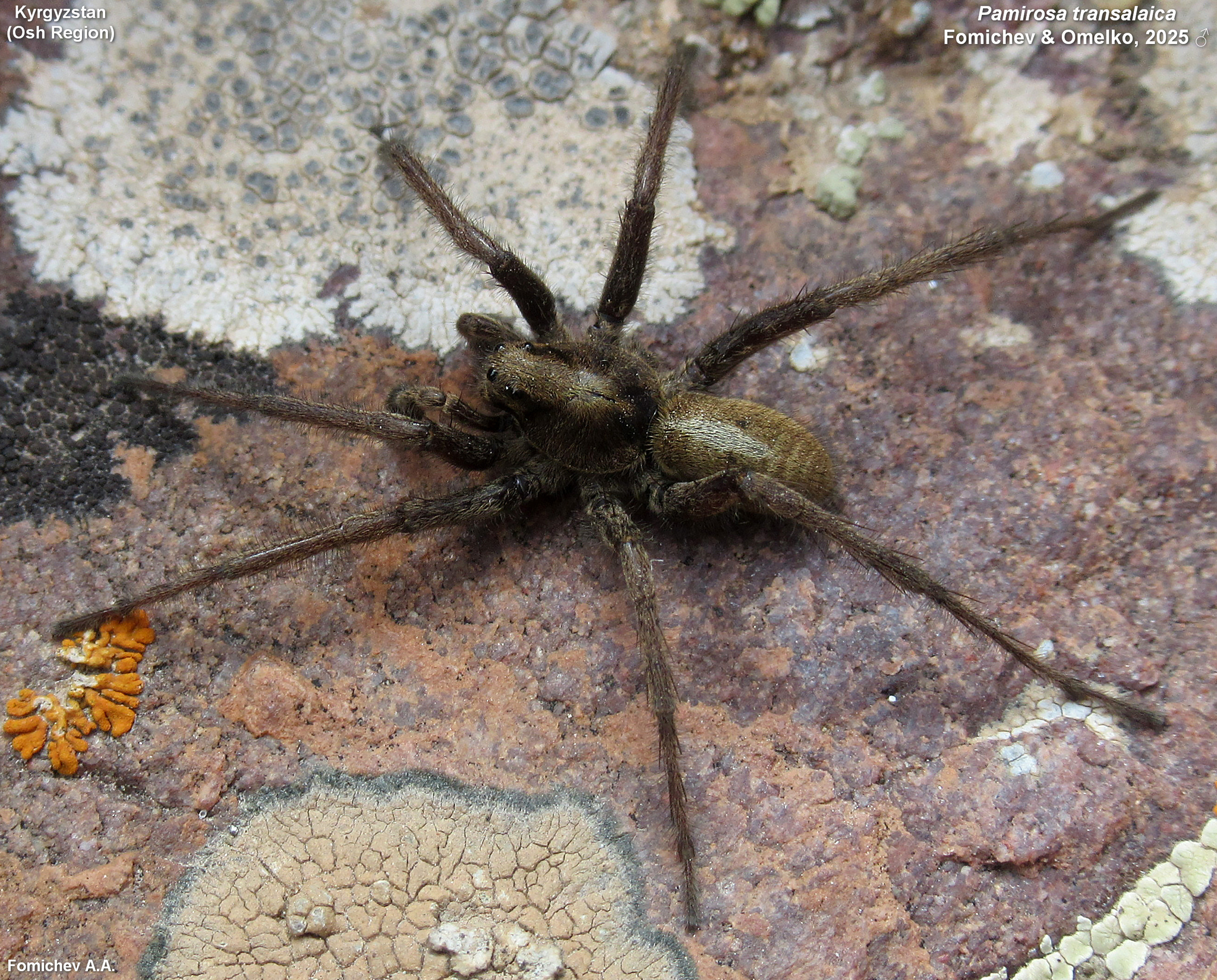
- male P. transalaica in Kyrgyzstan

Scientific classification
- Kingdom: Animalia
- Phylum: Arthropoda
- Subphylum: Chelicerata
- Class: Arachnida
- Order: Araneae
- Infraorder: Araneomorphae
- Family: Lycosidae
- Subfamily: Artoriinae
- Genus: Pamirosa; Fomichev, Omelko & Marusik, 2024

Type species
- P. kudratbekovi Fomichev, Omelko & Marusik, 2024

Species
- 5, see text

= Pamirosa =

Genus of spiders

Pamirosa is a genus of spiders in the family Lycosidae (wolf spiders).

P. kudratbekovi was collected among stone screes at an elevation of 4700 meters.

== Distribution ==
Pamirosa occurs in Central Asia, with species distributed across Kyrgyzstan, Tajikistan, and China.

== Etymology ==
The genus is named after the Pamir Mountains, Tajikistan (the type locality), and the common ending for wolf spider genera "-cosa".

== Species ==
As of January 2026, this genus includes five species:

- Pamirosa alaica Fomichev & Omelko, 2025 – Kyrgyzstan
- Pamirosa archalturica Fomichev & Omelko, 2025 – Kyrgyzstan
- Pamirosa kudratbekovi Fomichev, Omelko & Marusik, 2024 – Tajikistan
- Pamirosa muztagh Wang & Zhang, 2025 – China
- Pamirosa transalaica Fomichev & Omelko, 2025 – Kyrgyzstan
