= Zantheres =

Scientific classification
- Kingdom: Animalia
- Phylum: Arthropoda
- Subphylum: Chelicerata
- Class: Arachnida
- Order: Araneae
- Infraorder: Araneomorphae
- Family: Lycosidae
- Genus: Zantheres
- Species: Z. gracillimus

Binomial name
- Zantheres gracillimus Thorell, 1887

Genus of spiders

Zantheres is a genus of spiders in the family Lycosidae. It was first described in 1887 by Thorell. As of 2017, it contains only one species, Zantheres gracillimus, found in Myanmar.
