= Lysania =

Scientific classification
- Kingdom: Animalia
- Phylum: Arthropoda
- Subphylum: Chelicerata
- Class: Arachnida
- Order: Araneae
- Infraorder: Araneomorphae
- Family: Lycosidae
- Genus: Lysania; Thorell

Species
- Lysania deangia Li, Wang & Zhang, 2013; Lysania prolixa Malamel, Sankaran, Joseph & Sebastian, 2015; Lysania pygmaea Thorell, 1890; Lysania sabahensis Lehtinen & Hippa, 1979

Genus of spiders

Lysania is a genus of spiders in the family Lycosidae. It was first described in 1890 by Thorell. As of 2017, it contains 4 Asian species.
