= Melecosa =

Scientific classification
- Kingdom: Animalia
- Phylum: Arthropoda
- Subphylum: Chelicerata
- Class: Arachnida
- Order: Araneae
- Infraorder: Araneomorphae
- Family: Lycosidae
- Genus: Melecosa
- Species: M. alpina

Binomial name
- Melecosa alpina (Marusik, Azarkina & Koponen, 2004)

Genus of spiders

Melecosa is a genus of spiders in the family Lycosidae. Its lone species is found in Kazakhstan, Kyrgyzstan, and China.

The species was first described in 2004 by Marusik, Azarkina, and Koponen as Sibirocosa alpina, then transferred into its own genus in 2015.

This spider has a body length of up to 5.75 mm and has shorter legs than other Sibirocosa species. It is distinctively marked: the front of the cephalothorax (where the eyes are located) is black with two longitudinal brown stripes; the carapace is brown with paler stripes; the abdomen is blackish with a broad brown stripe down the middle. The legs have pale rings and differ from other Sibirocosa species by having a smaller number (3 vs. 4) of ventral tibial spines.
