= Tuberculosa =

Scientific classification
- Kingdom: Animalia
- Phylum: Arthropoda
- Subphylum: Chelicerata
- Class: Arachnida
- Order: Araneae
- Infraorder: Araneomorphae
- Family: Lycosidae
- Genus: Tuberculosa; Yoo

Species
- Tuberculosa austini Framenau & Yoo, 2006; Tuberculosa harveyi Framenau & Yoo, 2006; Tuberculosa hoggi (Framenau & Vink, 2001); Tuberculosa monteithi Framenau & Yoo, 2006

Genus of spiders

Tuberculosa is a genus of spiders in the family Lycosidae. It was first described in 2006 by Framenau & Yoo. As of 2017, it contains 4 Australian species.
