= Katableps =

Scientific classification
- Kingdom: Animalia
- Phylum: Arthropoda
- Subphylum: Chelicerata
- Class: Arachnida
- Order: Araneae
- Infraorder: Araneomorphae
- Family: Lycosidae
- Genus: Katableps; Alderweireldt

Species
- Katableps masoala Jocqué, Russell-Smith & Alderweireldt, 2011; Katableps perinet Jocqué, Russell-Smith & Alderweireldt, 2011; Katableps pudicus Jocqué, Russell-Smith & Alderweireldt, 2011

Genus of spiders

Katableps is a genus of spiders in the family Lycosidae. It was first described in 2011 by Jocqué, Russell-Smith & Alderweireldt. As of 2017, it contains 3 species from Madagascar.
