= Kangarosa =

Scientific classification
- Kingdom: Animalia
- Phylum: Arthropoda
- Subphylum: Chelicerata
- Class: Arachnida
- Order: Araneae
- Infraorder: Araneomorphae
- Family: Lycosidae
- Genus: Kangarosa; Framenau

Species
- 10, see text

Genus of spiders

Kangarosa is a genus of spiders in the family Lycosidae. It was first described in 2010 by Framenau. As of 2017, it contains 10 species from Australia.

== Species ==
Kangarosa comprises the following species:

- Kangarosa alboguttulata (L. Koch, 1878)
- Kangarosa focarius Framenau, 2010
- Kangarosa ludwigi Framenau, 2010
- Kangarosa nothofagus Framenau, 2010
- Kangarosa ossea Framenau, 2010
- Kangarosa pandura Framenau, 2010
- Kangarosa properipes (Simon, 1909)
- Kangarosa tasmaniensis Framenau, 2010
- Kangarosa tristicula (L. Koch, 1877)
- Kangarosa yannicki Framenau, 2010
