= Pseudevippa =

Scientific classification
- Kingdom: Animalia
- Phylum: Arthropoda
- Subphylum: Chelicerata
- Class: Arachnida
- Order: Araneae
- Infraorder: Araneomorphae
- Family: Lycosidae
- Genus: Pseudevippa; Simon, 1910
- Species: P. cana

Binomial name
- Pseudevippa cana Simon, 1910

Genus of spiders

Pseudevippa is a genus of spiders in the family Lycosidae. It was first described in 1910 by Eugène Simon. As of 2017, it contains only one species, Pseudevippa cana, found in Namibia.
