= Gnatholycosa =

Scientific classification
- Domain: Eukaryota
- Kingdom: Animalia
- Phylum: Arthropoda
- Subphylum: Chelicerata
- Class: Arachnida
- Order: Araneae
- Infraorder: Araneomorphae
- Family: Lycosidae
- Genus: Gnatholycosa
- Species: G. spinipalpis

Binomial name
- Gnatholycosa spinipalpis Mello-Leitão, 1940

Genus of spiders

Gnatholycosa is a genus of spiders in the family Lycosidae. It was first described in 1940 by Mello-Leitão. As of 2017, it contains only one species, Gnatholycosa spinipalpis, found in Argentina.
