= Dolocosa =

Scientific classification
- Kingdom: Animalia
- Phylum: Arthropoda
- Subphylum: Chelicerata
- Class: Arachnida
- Order: Araneae
- Infraorder: Araneomorphae
- Family: Lycosidae
- Genus: Dolocosa
- Species: D. dolosa

Binomial name
- Dolocosa dolosa (O. Pickard-Cambridge, 1873)

Genus of spiders

Dolocosa is a genus of spiders in the family Lycosidae. It was first described in 1960 by Roewer. As of 2017, it contains only one species, Dolocosa dolosa, on the island of Saint Helena.
