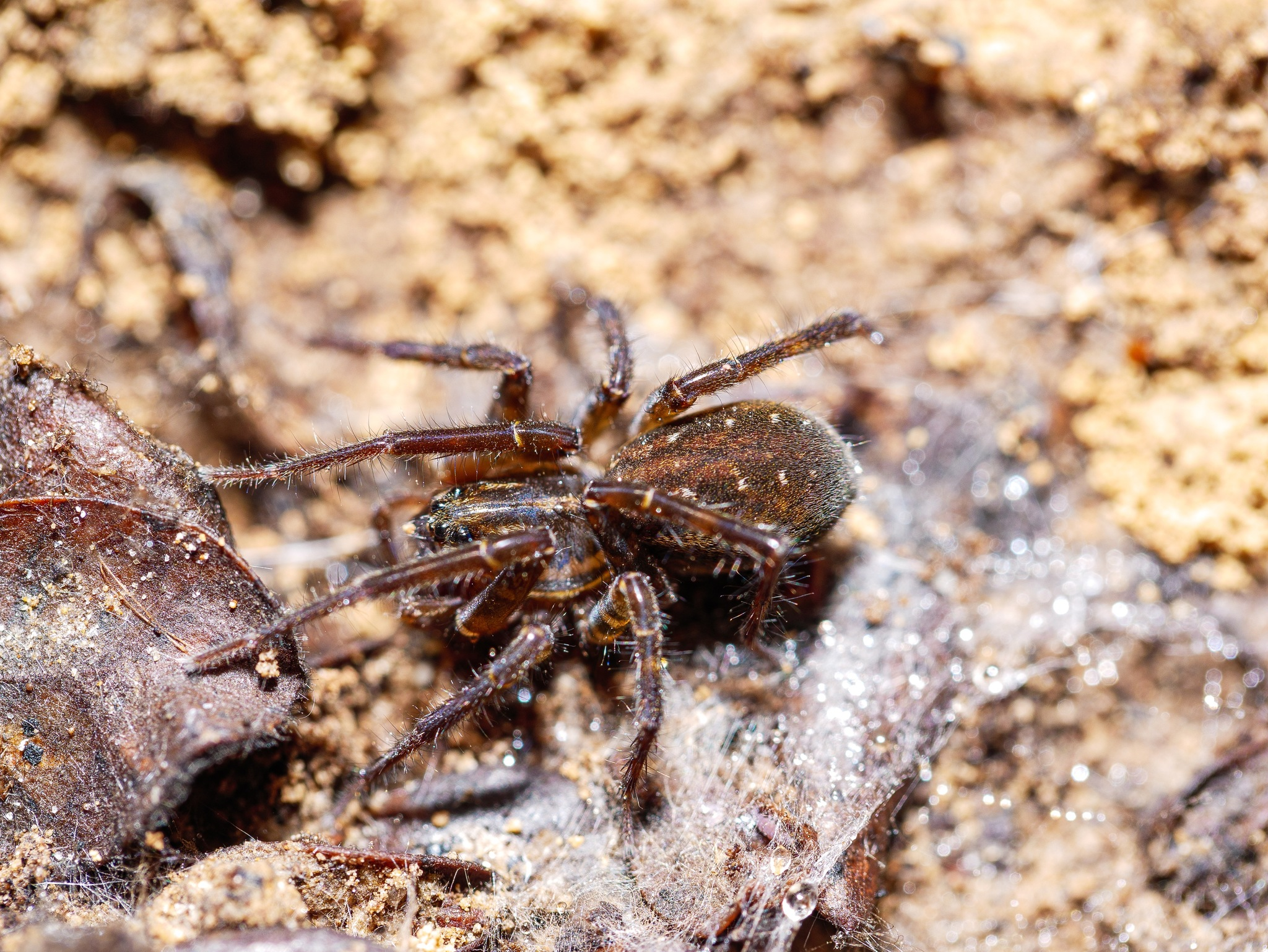
- Allotrochosina schauinslandi

Scientific classification
- Kingdom: Animalia
- Phylum: Arthropoda
- Subphylum: Chelicerata
- Class: Arachnida
- Order: Araneae
- Infraorder: Araneomorphae
- Family: Lycosidae
- Genus: Allotrochosina; Roewer

Species
- Allotrochosina karri Vink, 2001; Allotrochosina schauinslandi (Simon, 1899); Allotrochosina walesiana Framenau, 2008

= Allotrochosina =

Genus of spiders

Allotrochosina is a genus of spiders in the family Lycosidae. It was first described in 1960 by Roewer. As of 2017, it contains 3 species.
