= Cynosa =

Scientific classification
- Kingdom: Animalia
- Phylum: Arthropoda
- Subphylum: Chelicerata
- Class: Arachnida
- Order: Araneae
- Infraorder: Araneomorphae
- Family: Lycosidae
- Genus: Cynosa
- Species: C. agedabiae

Binomial name
- Cynosa agedabiae Caporiacco, 1933

Genus of spiders

Cynosa is a genus of spiders in the family Lycosidae. It was first described in 1933 by Caporiacco. As of 2017, it contains only one species, Cynosa agedabiae, which is found in North Africa.
