= Brevilabus =

Scientific classification
- Kingdom: Animalia
- Phylum: Arthropoda
- Subphylum: Chelicerata
- Class: Arachnida
- Order: Araneae
- Infraorder: Araneomorphae
- Family: Lycosidae
- Genus: Brevilabus; Strand

Species
- Brevilabus gillonorum Cornic, 1980; Brevilabus oryx (Simon, 1886)

Genus of spiders

Brevilabus is a genus of spiders in the family Lycosidae. It was first described in 1908 by Strand. As of 2017, it contains 2 species.
