= Pandacosa =

Scientific classification
- Kingdom: Animalia
- Phylum: Arthropoda
- Subphylum: Chelicerata
- Class: Arachnida
- Order: Araneae
- Infraorder: Araneomorphae
- Family: Lycosidae
- Genus: Pandacosa; Wang, Li, Marusik & Zhang, 2026
- Species: P. bifasciata

Binomial name
- Pandacosa bifasciata (Buchar, 1997)

Species of spider

Pandacosa is a monotypic genus of spiders in the family Lycosidae containing the single species, Pandacosa bifasciata.

== Distribution ==
Pandacosa bifasciata has been recorded from Bhutan and China.
