= Dzhungarocosa =

Scientific classification
- Kingdom: Animalia
- Phylum: Arthropoda
- Subphylum: Chelicerata
- Class: Arachnida
- Order: Araneae
- Infraorder: Araneomorphae
- Family: Lycosidae
- Genus: Dzhungarocosa; Fomichev & Marusik, 2017

Species
- D. ballarini Fomichev & Marusik, 2017 — Kazakhstan; D. omelkoi Fomichev & Marusik, 2017 — Kazakhstan; D. zhishengi Fomichev & Marusik, 2017 — Kazakhstan

Genus of spiders

Dzhungarocosa is a genus of Kazakh wolf spiders first described by A. A. Fomichev & Yuri M. Marusik in 2017. As of April 2019 it contains only three species.
