= Agalenocosa =

Scientific classification
- Domain: Eukaryota
- Kingdom: Animalia
- Phylum: Arthropoda
- Subphylum: Chelicerata
- Class: Arachnida
- Order: Araneae
- Infraorder: Araneomorphae
- Family: Lycosidae
- Genus: Agalenocosa; Mello-Leitão

Species
- 18, see text

Genus of spiders

Agalenocosa is a genus of spiders in the family Lycosidae. It was first described in 1944 by Mello-Leitão. As of 2017, it contains 18 species with a wide distribution.

== Species ==
Agalenocosa comprises the following species:

- Agalenocosa bryantae (Roewer, 1951)
- Agalenocosa chacoensis (Mello-Leitão, 1942)
- Agalenocosa denisi (Caporiacco, 1947)
- Agalenocosa fallax (L. Koch, 1877)
- Agalenocosa gamas Piacentini, 2014
- Agalenocosa gentilis Mello-Leitão, 1944
- Agalenocosa grismadoi Piacentini, 2014
- Agalenocosa helvola (C. L. Koch, 1847)
- Agalenocosa kolbei (Dahl, 1908)
- Agalenocosa luteonigra (Mello-Leitão, 1945)
- Agalenocosa melanotaenia (Mello-Leitão, 1941)
- Agalenocosa pickeli (Mello-Leitão, 1937)
- Agalenocosa pirity Piacentini, 2014
- Agalenocosa punctata Mello-Leitão, 1944
- Agalenocosa subinermis (Simon, 1897)
- Agalenocosa tricuspidata (Tullgren, 1905)
- Agalenocosa velox (Keyserling, 1891)
- Agalenocosa yaucensis (Petrunkevitch, 1929)
