= Edenticosa =

Scientific classification
- Kingdom: Animalia
- Phylum: Arthropoda
- Subphylum: Chelicerata
- Class: Arachnida
- Order: Araneae
- Infraorder: Araneomorphae
- Family: Lycosidae
- Genus: Edenticosa
- Species: E. edentula

Binomial name
- Edenticosa edentula (Simon, 1910)

Genus of spiders

Edenticosa is a genus of spiders in the family Lycosidae. It was first described in 1960 by Roewer. As of 2017, it contains only one species, Edenticosa edentula, on the island of Bioko.
