= Knoelle =

Scientific classification
- Kingdom: Animalia
- Phylum: Arthropoda
- Subphylum: Chelicerata
- Class: Arachnida
- Order: Araneae
- Infraorder: Araneomorphae
- Family: Lycosidae
- Genus: Knoelle
- Species: K. clara

Binomial name
- Knoelle clara (L. Koch, 1877)

Genus of spiders

Knoelle is a genus of spiders in the family Lycosidae. It was first described in 2006 by Framenau. As of 2017, it contains only one species, Knoelle clara.
