= Arctosippa =

Scientific classification
- Kingdom: Animalia
- Phylum: Arthropoda
- Subphylum: Chelicerata
- Class: Arachnida
- Order: Araneae
- Infraorder: Araneomorphae
- Family: Lycosidae
- Genus: Arctosippa; Roewer, 1960
- Species: A. gracilis

Binomial name
- Arctosippa gracilis (Keyserling, 1881)

Genus of spiders

Arctosippa is a monotypic genus of spiders in the family Lycosidae. It was first described by Roewer in 1960. As of 2023, it contains only one species, Arctosippa gracilis, found in Peru.
