= Diapontia =

Scientific classification
- Kingdom: Animalia
- Phylum: Arthropoda
- Subphylum: Chelicerata
- Class: Arachnida
- Order: Araneae
- Infraorder: Araneomorphae
- Family: Lycosidae
- Genus: Diapontia; Keyserling, 1877

Type species
- Diapontia uruguayensis Keyserling, 1877

Species
- 9, see text

Genus of spiders

Diapontia is a genus of spiders in the family Lycosidae. It was first described in 1877 by Keyserling.

== Species ==
As of January 2023 it contains nine species:

- Diapontia anfibia (Zapfe-Mann, 1979) — Chile, Argentina
- Diapontia arapensis (Strand, 1908) — Peru
- Diapontia calama Piacentini, Scioscia, Carbajal, Ott, Brescovit & Ramírez, 2017 — Chile
- Diapontia chamberlini Piacentini, Scioscia, Carbajal, Ott, Brescovit & Ramírez, 2017 — Peru
- Diapontia niveovittata Mello-Leitão, 1945 — Brazil, Paraguay, Argentina
- Diapontia oxapampa Piacentini, Scioscia, Carbajal, Ott, Brescovit & Ramírez, 2017 — Peru
- Diapontia securifera (Tullgren, 1905) — Argentina, Chile
- Diapontia songotal Piacentini, Scioscia, Carbajal, Ott, Brescovit & Ramírez, 2017 — Bolivia
- Diapontia uruguayensis Keyserling, 1877 — Brazil, Paraguay, Uruguay, Argentina, Chile
