= Birabenia =

Scientific classification
- Domain: Eukaryota
- Kingdom: Animalia
- Phylum: Arthropoda
- Subphylum: Chelicerata
- Class: Arachnida
- Order: Araneae
- Infraorder: Araneomorphae
- Family: Lycosidae
- Genus: Birabenia; Mello-Leitão

Species
- Birabenia birabenae Mello-Leitão, 1941; Birabenia vittata (Mello-Leitão, 1945)

Genus of spiders

Birabenia is a genus of spiders in the family Lycosidae. It was first described in 1941 by Mello-Leitão. As of 2017, it contains 2 species.
