= Algidus (spider) =

Scientific classification
- Kingdom: Animalia
- Phylum: Arthropoda
- Subphylum: Chelicerata
- Class: Arachnida
- Order: Araneae
- Infraorder: Araneomorphae
- Family: Lycosidae
- Genus: Algidus; Simon, 1898
- Species: A. marmoratus

Binomial name
- Algidus marmoratus Simon, 1898

Genus of spiders

Algidus is a monotypic genus of spiders in the wolf spider family Lycosidae. It was first described by Eugène Simon in 1898. As of 2023, it contains only one species, Algidus marmoratus, found in Venezuela.
