= Margonia =

Scientific classification
- Kingdom: Animalia
- Phylum: Arthropoda
- Subphylum: Chelicerata
- Class: Arachnida
- Order: Araneae
- Infraorder: Araneomorphae
- Family: Lycosidae
- Genus: Margonia
- Species: M. himalayensis

Binomial name
- Margonia himalayensis (Gravely, 1924)

Genus of spiders

Margonia is a genus of spiders in the family Lycosidae. It was first described in 1983 by Hippa & Lehtinen. As of 2017, it contains only one species, Margonia himalayensis, found in India.
