= Chicosa =

Scientific classification
- Kingdom: Animalia
- Phylum: Arthropoda
- Subphylum: Chelicerata
- Class: Arachnida
- Order: Araneae
- Infraorder: Araneomorphae
- Family: Lycosidae
- Genus: Chicosa; Tao, Fu, Wu, Wang, Liu & Luo, 2025
- Species: C. cinnameopilosa

Binomial name
- Chicosa cinnameopilosa (Schenkel, 1963)

Species of spider

Chicosa is a monotypic genus of spiders in the family Lycosidae containing the single species, Chicosa cinnameopilosa.

== Distribution ==
Chicosa cinnameopilosa has been recorded from Kazakhstan, Russia (Central Asia to Far East), China, Korea, and Japan.
