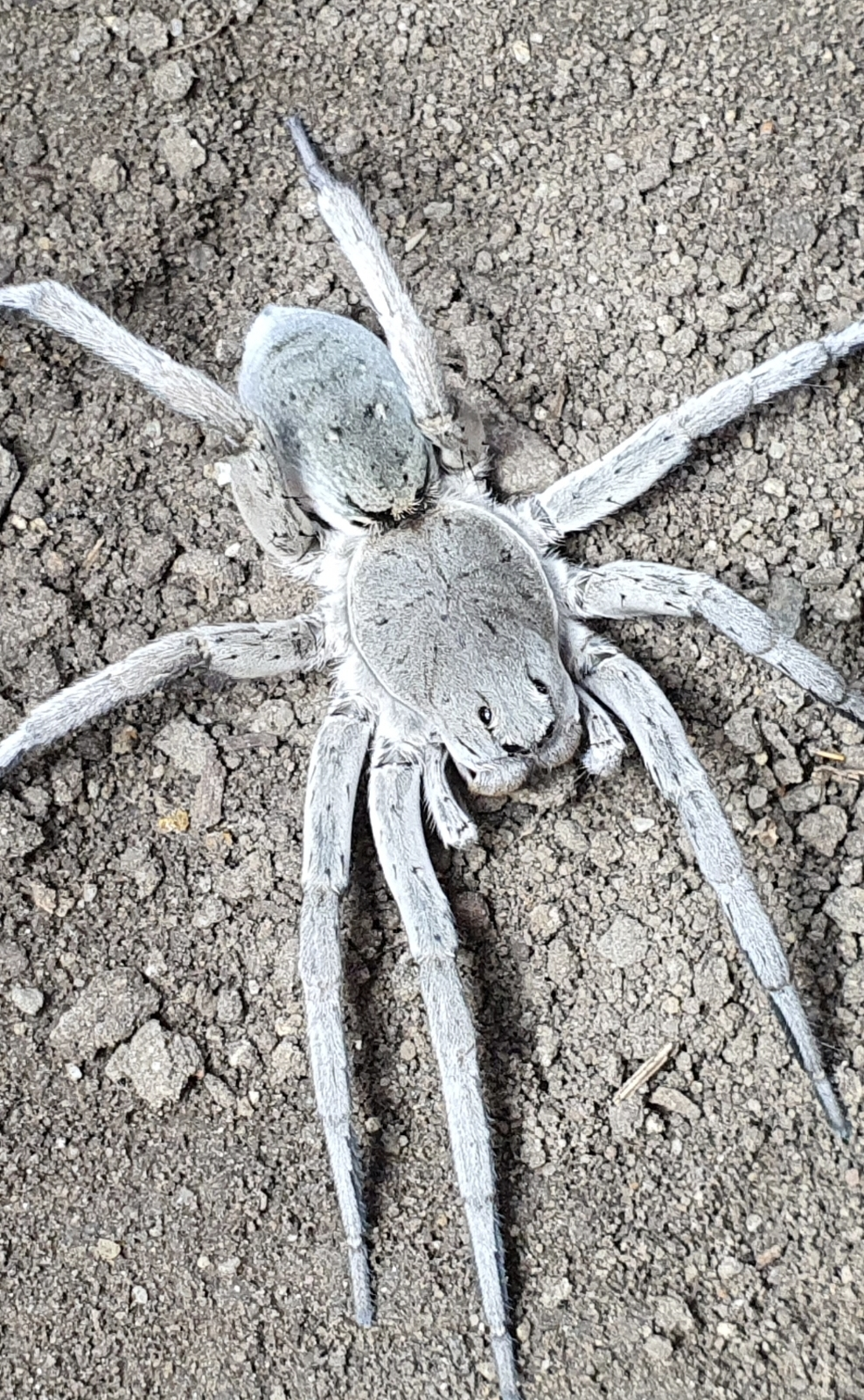
- Female Portacosa cinerea
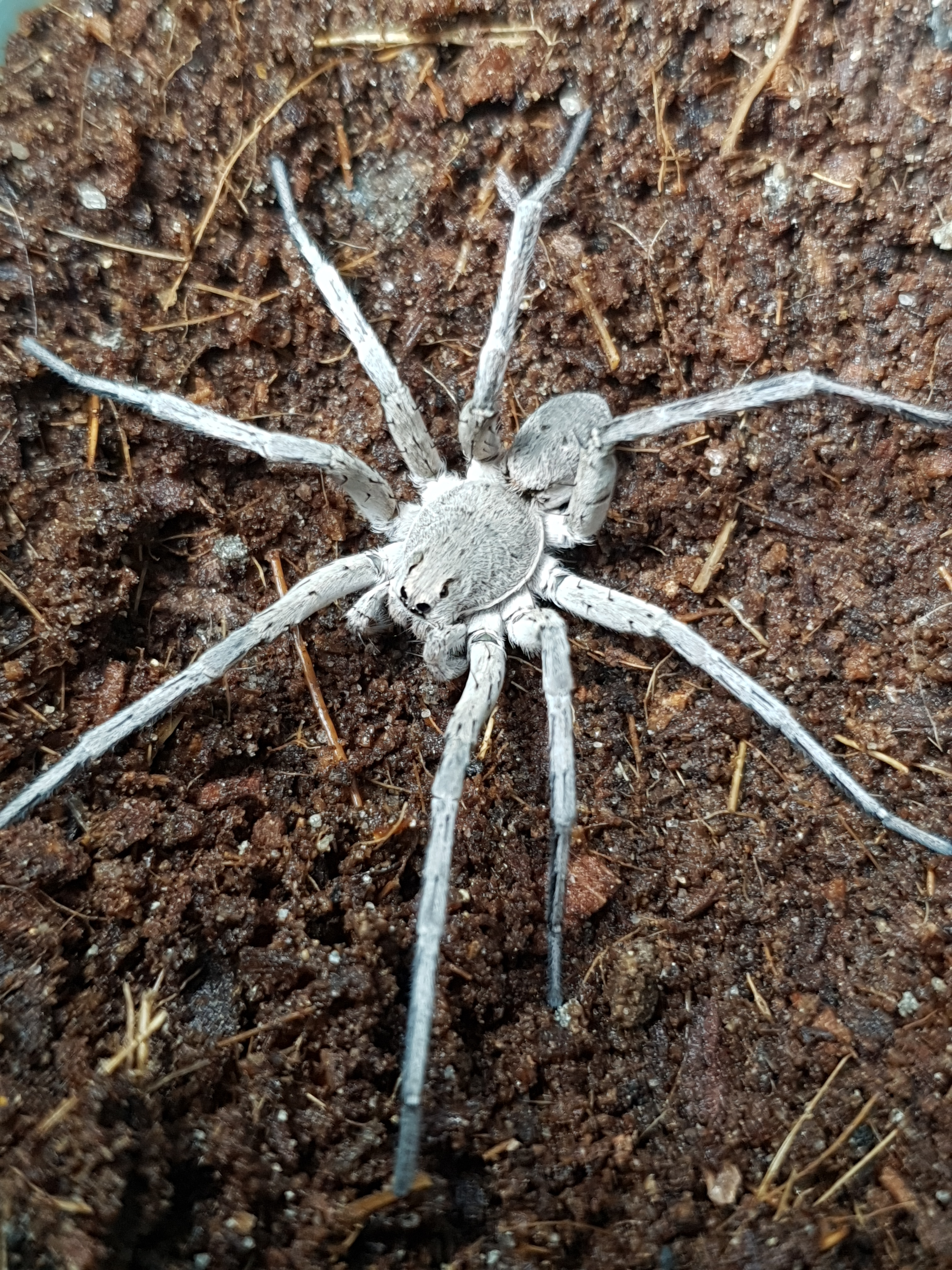
- Male Portacosa cinerea

Scientific classification
- Kingdom: Animalia
- Phylum: Arthropoda
- Subphylum: Chelicerata
- Class: Arachnida
- Order: Araneae
- Infraorder: Araneomorphae
- Family: Lycosidae
- Genus: Portacosa; Framenau, 2017
- Species: P. cinerea

Binomial name
- Portacosa cinerea Framenau, 2017

= Portacosa =

Genus of spiders

Portacosa is a genus of wolf spiders containing the single species Portacosa cinerea. It was first described by V. W. Framenau in 2017, and is only found in Australia.
