= Tapetosa =

Scientific classification
- Kingdom: Animalia
- Phylum: Arthropoda
- Subphylum: Chelicerata
- Class: Arachnida
- Order: Araneae
- Infraorder: Araneomorphae
- Family: Lycosidae
- Genus: Tapetosa
- Species: T. darwini

Binomial name
- Tapetosa darwini Framenau, Main, Harvey & Waldock, 2009

Genus of spiders

Tapetosa is a genus of spiders in the family Lycosidae. It was first described in 2009 by Framenau et al.. As of 2017, it contains only one species, Tapetosa darwini, found in western Australia.
