= Crocodilosa =

Scientific classification
- Kingdom: Animalia
- Phylum: Arthropoda
- Subphylum: Chelicerata
- Class: Arachnida
- Order: Araneae
- Infraorder: Araneomorphae
- Family: Lycosidae
- Genus: Crocodilosa; Caporiacco

Species
- Crocodilosa kittenbergeri Caporiacco, 1947 – East Africa; Crocodilosa leucostigma (Simon, 1885) – India; Crocodilosa maindroni (Simon, 1897) – India; Crocodilosa ovicula (Thorell, 1895) – Myanmar; Crocodilosa virulenta (O. Pickard-Cambridge, 1876) – Egypt

Genus of spiders

Crocodilosa is a genus of spiders in the family Lycosidae. It was first described in 1947 by Caporiacco. As of 2017, it contains 5 species.
