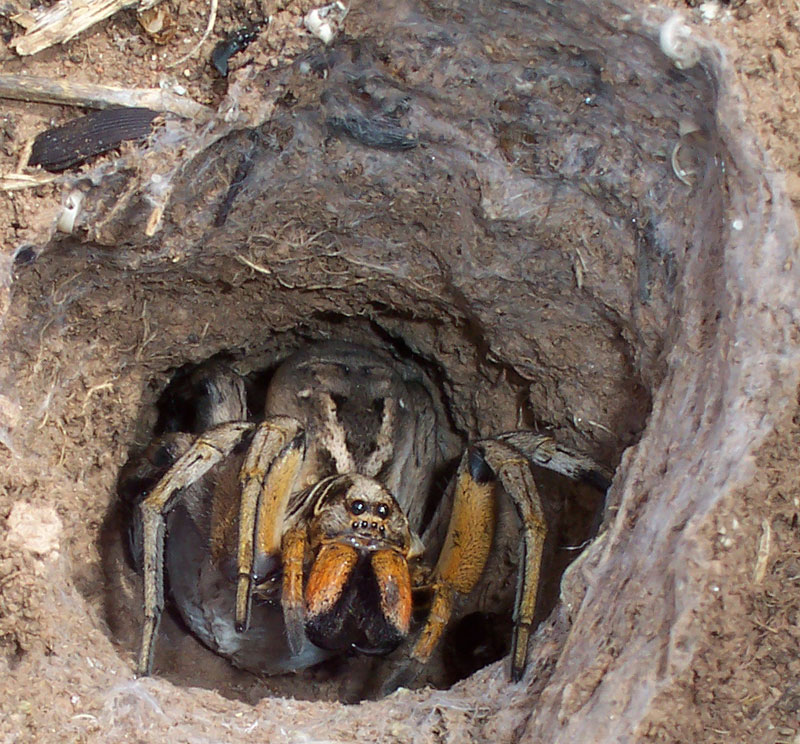
- Geolycosa species in a burrow

Scientific classification
- Kingdom: Animalia
- Phylum: Arthropoda
- Subphylum: Chelicerata
- Class: Arachnida
- Order: Araneae
- Infraorder: Araneomorphae
- Superfamily: Lycosoidea
- Family: Lycosidae; Sundevall, 1833

Diversity
- 140 genera, 2,510 species
- blue: reported countries (WSC) green: observation hotspots (iNaturalist)

= Wolf spider =

Wolf spiders Temporal range: Paleogene–present

Family of spiders

Wolf spiders are members of the family Lycosidae (from Ancient Greek λύκος (lúkos) 'wolf'), named for their robust and agile hunting skills and excellent eyesight.

They live mostly in solitude, hunt alone, and usually do not spin webs. Some are opportunistic hunters, pouncing upon prey as they find it or chasing it over short distances; others wait for passing prey in or near the mouth of a burrow.

Wolf spiders resemble nursery web spiders (family Pisauridae), but wolf spiders carry their egg sacs by attaching them to their spinnerets, while the Pisauridae carry their egg sacs with their chelicerae and pedipalps.

Two of the wolf spider's eight eyes are large and prominent; this distinguishes them from nursery web spiders, whose eyes are all of roughly equal size. This can also help distinguish them from the similar-looking grass spiders.

== Description ==
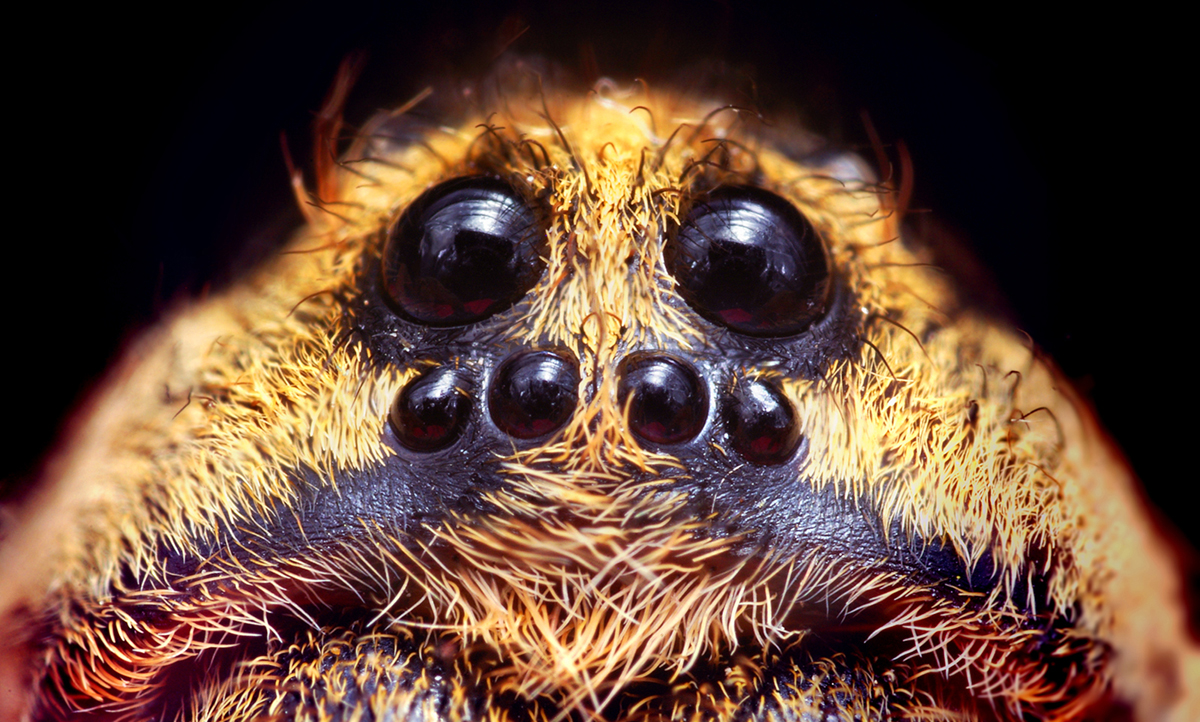
Eye configuration of a Hogna species

The many genera of wolf spiders range in body size (legs not included) from less than 10 to 35 mm (0.4 to 1.38 in). They have eight eyes arranged in three rows. The bottom row consists of four small eyes, the middle row has two very large eyes (which distinguishes them from the Pisauridae), and the top row has two medium-sized eyes. Unlike most other arachnids, which are generally blind or have poor vision, wolf spiders have excellent eyesight.

The tapetum lucidum is a retroreflective tissue found in eyes. This reflective tissue is only found in four secondary eyes of the wolf spider. Flashing a beam of light over the spider produces eyeshine; this eyeshine can be seen when the lighting source is roughly coaxial with the viewer or sensor. The light from the light source (e.g., a flashlight or sunlight) has been reflected from the spider's eyes directly back toward its source, producing a "glow" that is easily noticed. Wolf spiders possess the third-best eyesight of all spider groups, bettered by jumping spiders of the family Salticidae (which can distinguish colors) and the huntsman spiders of the family Sparassidae.

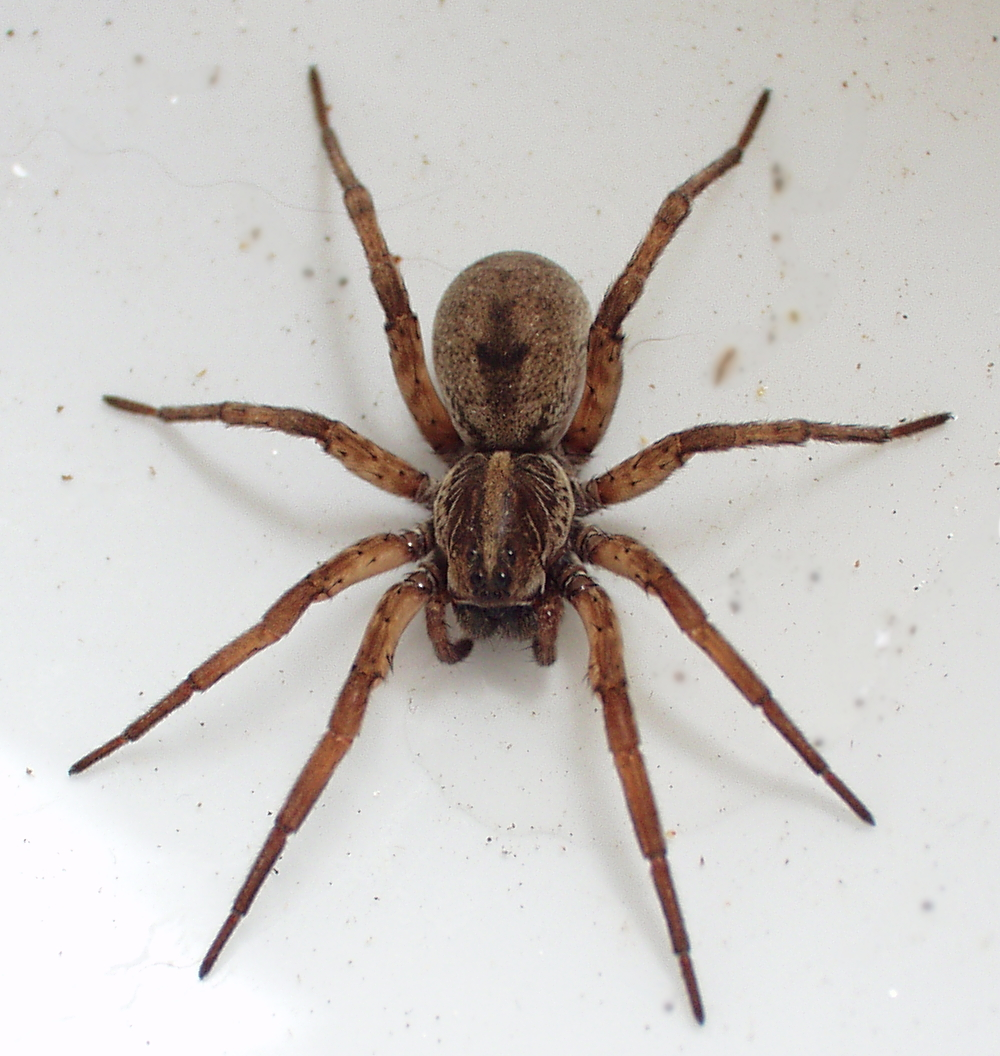
Dorsal aspect of Hogna lenta, a typical wolf spider

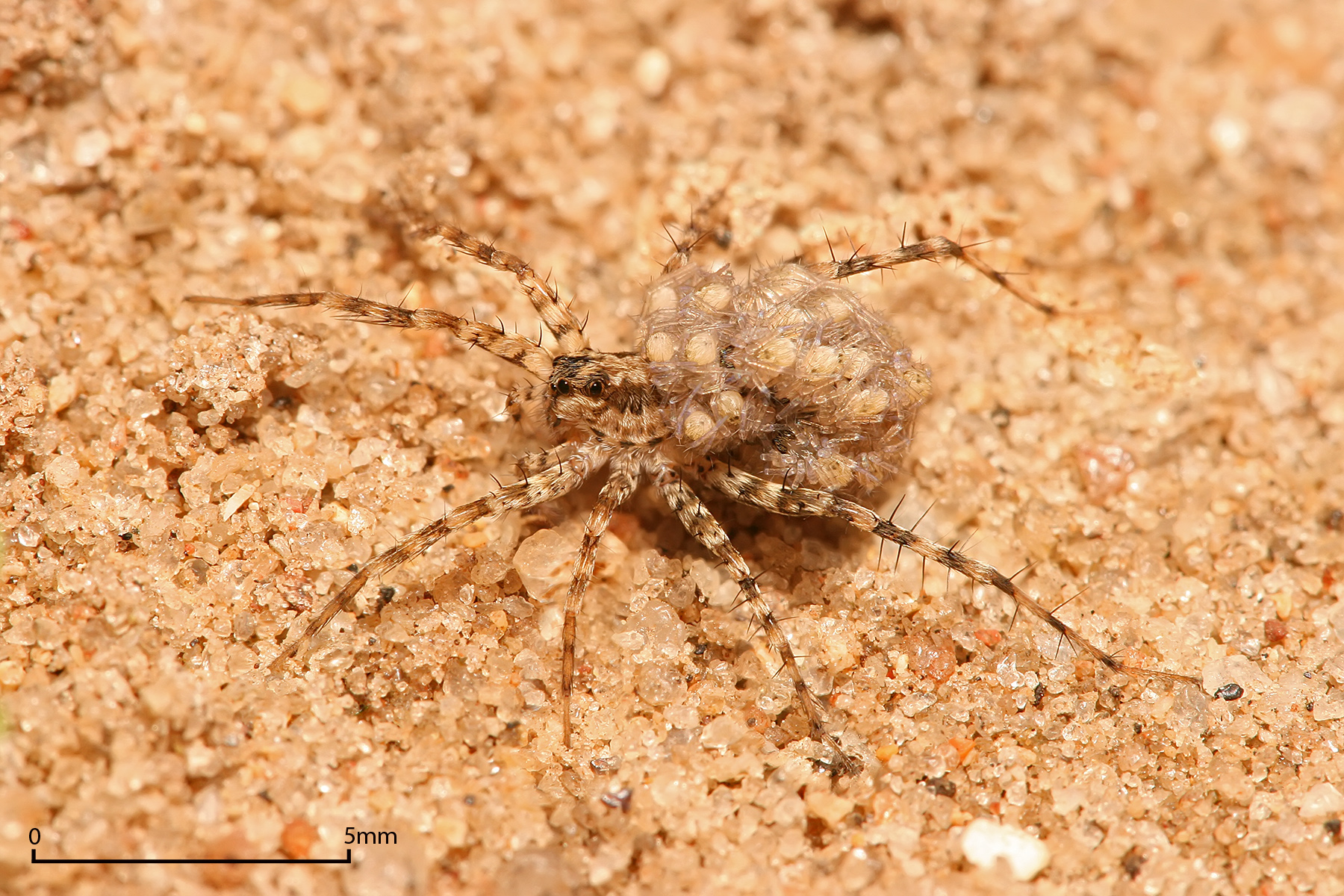
A female wolf spider carrying her young on her back

Wolf spiders are unique in the way that they carry their eggs. The egg sac, a round, silken globe, is attached to the spinnerets at the end of the abdomen, allowing the spider to carry her unhatched young with her. The abdomen must be held in a raised position to keep the egg case from dragging on the ground. Despite this handicap, they are still capable of hunting. Another aspect unique to wolf spiders is their method of caring for their young. Immediately after the spiderlings emerge from their protective silken case, they clamber up their mother's legs and crowd onto the dorsal side of her abdomen. The mother carries the spiderlings for several weeks before they are large enough to disperse and fend for themselves.

Because they depend on camouflage for protection, they do not have the flashy appearance of some other kinds of spiders. In general, their coloration is appropriate to their favorite habitat.

Hogna is the genus with the largest of the wolf spiders. Among the Hogna species in the U.S., the nearly solid dark brown H. carolinensis (Carolina wolf spider) is the largest, with a body that can be more than 2.5 cm (1 in) long. It is sometimes confused with H. helluo, which is somewhat smaller and different in coloration. The underside of H. carolinensis is solid black, but the underside of H. helluo is variegated and has reds, oranges, and yellows with shades of black.

Some members of the Lycosidae, such as H. carolinensis, make deep, tubular burrows where they often lurk. Others, such as H. helluo, seek shelter under rocks and other shelters as nature may provide. As with spiders in general, males of almost any species can sometimes be found inside homes and buildings as they wander searching for females during the autumn.

Wolf spiders play an important role in natural population control of insects and are often considered "beneficial bugs" due to their predation of pest species within farms and gardens.

=== Venom ===
Wolf spiders inject venom if continually provoked. Symptoms of their bites include swelling and mild pain. In the past, necrotic bites have been attributed to some South American and Australian species, but further investigation has indicated that those problems that did occur were probably due to bites by members of other families or did not induce those effects.

== Habitats ==
Wolf spiders are found in a wide range of coastal and inland habitats. These include shrublands, woodland, wet coastal forests, alpine meadows, suburban gardens, and homes. Spiderlings disperse aerially; consequently, wolf spiders have wide distributions. Although some species have very specific microhabitat needs (such as stream-side gravel beds or montane herb fields), most are wanderers without permanent homes. Some build burrows which can be left open or have a trap door (depending on species). Arid-zone species construct turrets or plug their holes with leaves and pebbles during the rainy season to protect themselves from flood waters. Often, they are found in man-made locations such as sheds and other outdoor equipment.

== Mating behavior ==
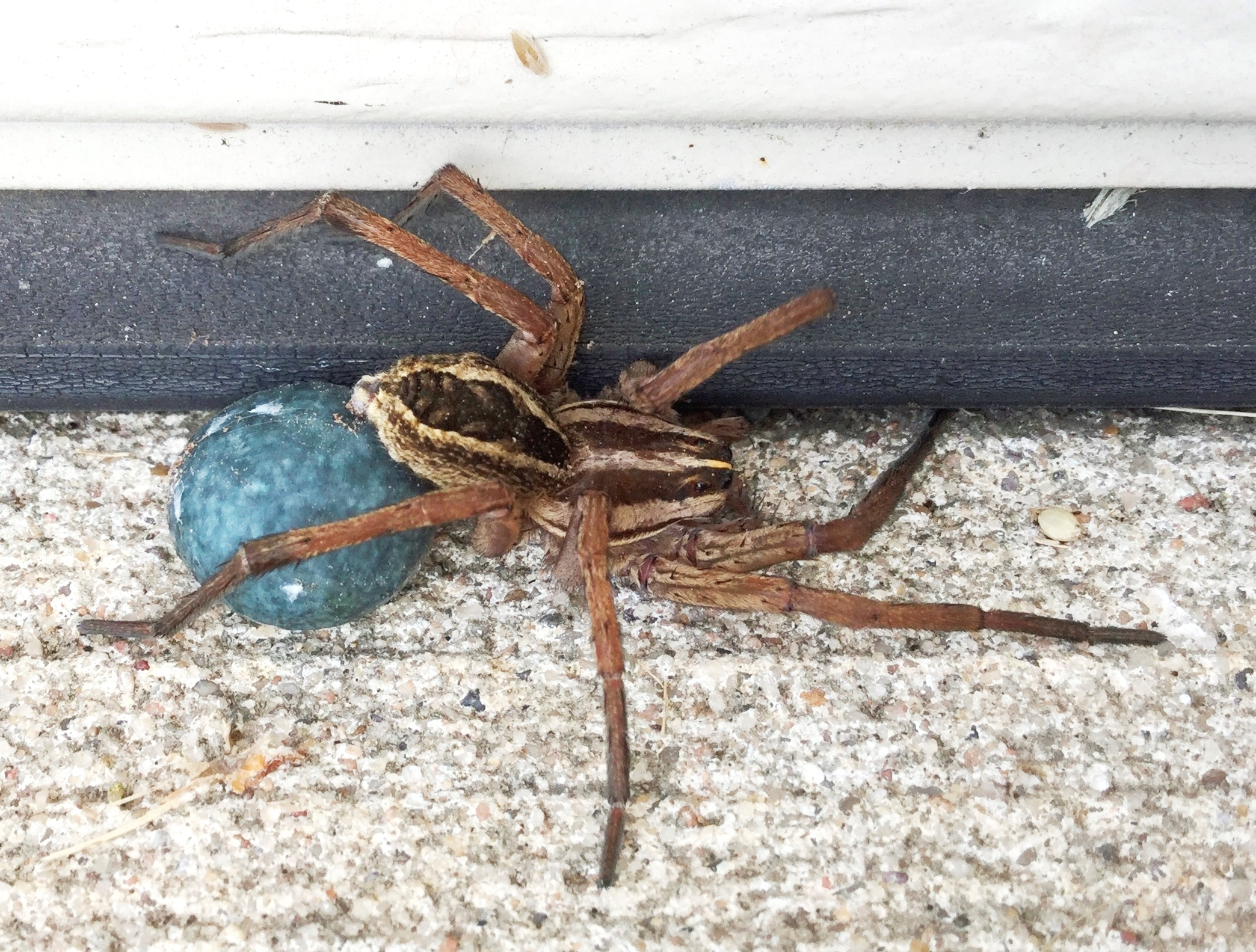
Female wolf spider carrying her egg sac behind her

Many species of wolf spiders possess very complex courtship behaviors and secondary sexual characteristics, such as tufts of bristles on their legs or special colorations, which are most often found on the males of the species. These sexual characteristics vary by species and are most often found as modifications of the first pair of legs. First-leg modifications are often divided into elongated bristles on the legs, increased swelling of leg segments, or the full elongation of the first pair of legs compared to the other three pairs. Some mating behaviors are common between wolf spider genera, and many more are species-specific. In the most commonly studied genus of wolf spiders, Schizocosa, researchers found that all males engage in a seismic component of their courtship display, either stridulation, or drumming their forelegs on the ground, but some also dependent on visual cues in their courtship display, as well as the seismic signaling, such as waving the front two legs in the air in front of the female, concluding that some Schizocosa species rely on multimodal courtship behaviors.

The Lycosidae comprise mainly wandering spiders, and as such, population density and male-to-female sex ratio put selective pressures on wolf spiders when finding mates. Female wolf spiders that have already mated are more likely to eat the next male that tries to mate with them than those that have not mated yet. Males that have already mated have a higher probability of successfully mating again, but females that have already mated have a lower probability of mating again.

== Relationship to humans ==
Though wolf spiders can occasionally bite humans, their bites are not dangerous. Wolf spider bites often result in mild redness, itching, ulcers, and if the bite wound is not cleaned, it could lead to infection. However, wolf spiders usually only bite when they feel threatened or mishandled.

Wolf spiders are a vital source of natural pest control for many people's gardens or even homes, since the wolf spider preys on perceived pests such as crickets, ants, cockroaches, and in some cases lizards and frogs.

== In culture ==
South Carolina designated the Carolina wolf spider (Hogna carolinensis) as the official state spider in 2000 due to the efforts of Skyler B. Hutto, a third-grade student at Sheridan Elementary School in Orangeburg. At the time, South Carolina was the only U.S. state that recognized a state spider. In 2015, efforts began to name an official state spider for neighboring North Carolina.

== Evolutionary history ==
Wolf spiders likely originated during the late Eocene, with major radiations occurring alongside periods of global cooling during the Oligocene and Miocene. Vagrant hunting is their likely ancestral state, with web-building and burrowing evolving later.

Cladogram proposed by Liu et al. (2025) based on differences in mitochondrial DNA.

- Lycosidae
  - - - - - - - - - - Pardosa astrigera
                    - Pardosa taczanowskii
                  - - Pardosa kronestedti
                    - Pardosa sp. ON411610
                - - Pardosa isago
                  - Pardosa lyrifera
                - Pardosa falcata
                - - Pardosa brevivulva
                  - - Pardosa hedini
                    - Pardosa laura
                  - Pardosa hanrasanensis
                - - - - Pardosa chapini
                      - - Pardosa jambaruensis
                        - Pardosa sumatrana
                    - - - Pardosa oriens
                        - Pardosa tschekiagienesis
                      - Pardosa pusiola
                  - Pardosa pseudoannulata
              - Wadicosa fidelis
            - Alopecosa cinnameopilosa
        - - - - Lycosa coelestis
              - Lycosa grahami
            - Lycosa sp. ON951646
          - - - - Trochosa aquatica
                - - Trochosa longa
                  - Trochosa ruricoloides
              - Trochosa ruricola
            - - Ovia procurva
              - - Alopecosa licenti
                - - Alopecosa albostriata
                  - Alopecosa cursor
      - - - - - - Arctosa depectinata
                - Arctosa khudiensis
              - - Arctosa laminata
                - Arctosa xunyagensis
            - - - - Arctosa hainan
                  - Arctosa kiangsiensis
                - Arctosa tanakai
              - - Arctosa stigmosa
                - Arctosa submylacea
          - Arctosa ipsa
        - - Hippasa holmerae
          - Holmasa sp. LCG22
    - - - Arctosa ningboensis
        - Hygrolycosa umidicola
      - - - - - Evippa sp. LCG21
            - - Halocosa hatanensis
          - - Pardosa multivaga
  - - Pirata subpiraticus
    - - - - - Piratula meridionalis
            - Piratula serrulata
          - - Piratula procurva
            - Piratula tenuisetacea
        - - Piratula montigena
          - Piratula yaginumai
      - Piratula piratoides

== Genera ==
As of January 2026, this family includes 140 genera and 2,510 species:

- Abaycosa Laborda, Bidegaray-Batista, Simó, Brescovit, Beloso & Piacentini, 2022 – South America
- Acantholycosa Dahl, 1908 – Asia, Europe, North America
- Adelocosa Gertsch, 1973 – Hawaii
- Agalenocosa Mello-Leitão, 1944 – Pakistan, Australia, Papua New Guinea, Mexico to South America
- Aglaoctenus Tullgren, 1905 – South America
- Algidus Simon, 1898 – Venezuela
- Allocosa Banks, 1900 – Africa, Asia, United States, Mexico, South America, Oceania
- Allotrochosina Roewer, 1960 – China, Vietnam, Australia, New Zealand
- Alopecosa Simon, 1885 – Worldwide
- Amblyothele Simon, 1910 – Africa
- Anomalomma Simon, 1890 – Zimbabwe, Indonesia, Pakistan
- Anomalosa Roewer, 1960 – Australia
- Anoteropsis L. Koch, 1878 – Indonesia, New Zealand
- Antembolus Sherwood, Henrard, Logunov & Fowler, 2023 – St. Helena
- Arctosa C. L. Koch, 1847 – Africa, Asia, Europe, North America, South America, Vanuatu
- Arctosippa Roewer, 1960 – Peru
- Arctosomma Roewer, 1960 – Ethiopia
- Artoria Thorell, 1877 – Democratic Republic of the Congo, Namibia, South Africa, China, Indonesia, Malaysia, Philippines, Oceania
- Artoriellula Roewer, 1960 – South Africa, Indonesia
- Artoriopsis Framenau, 2007 – Australia, New Zealand
- Asiacosa Logunov, 2023 – Egypt, Tajikistan, Turkmenistan, Uzbekistan
- Aulonia C. L. Koch, 1847 – Asia, Cyprus, Greece
- Auloniella Roewer, 1960 – Tanzania
- Birabenia Mello-Leitão, 1941 – Argentina, Uruguay
- Bogdocosa Ponomarev & Belosludtsev, 2008 – Asia, Russia
- Brevilabus Strand, 1908 – Ethiopia, Ivory Coast, Senegal
- Bristowiella Saaristo, 1980 – Comoros, Seychelles
- Camptocosa Dondale, Jiménez & Nieto, 2005 – Mexico, United States
- Caspicosa Ponomarev, 2007 – Afghanistan, Kazakhstan, Russia
- Chicosa Tao, Fu, Wu, Wang, Liu & Luo, 2025 – Kazakhstan, China, Japan, Korea, Russia
- Costacosa Framenau & Leung, 2013 – Australia
- Crocodilosa Caporiacco, 1947 – Tanzania, Egypt, Myanmar, India, Pakistan
- Cynosa Caporiacco, 1933 – Libya
- Dejerosa Roewer, 1960 – Mozambique
- Deliriosa Kovblyuk, 2009 – Ukraine
- Diahogna Roewer, 1960 – Australia, New Caledonia
- Diapontia Keyserling, 1877 – South America
- Dingosa Roewer, 1955 – Australia, Brazil, Peru
- Dolocosa Roewer, 1960 – St. Helena
- Donacosa Alderweireldt & Jocqué, 1991 – Spain
- Dorjulopirata Buchar, 1997 – Bhutan
- Draposa Kronestedt, 2010 – Asia
- Dzhungarocosa Fomichev & Marusik, 2017 – Kazakhstan
- Edenticosa Roewer, 1960 – Equatorial Guinea
- Evippa Simon, 1882 – Africa, Asia, Russia, Spain
- Evippomma Roewer, 1959 – Africa, Pakistan, Israel
- Foveosa Russell-Smith, Alderweireldt & Jocqué, 2007 – Africa
- Geolycosa Montgomery, 1904 – Africa, Asia, Eastern Europe, North America, South America, Australia, Papua New Guinea
- Gladicosa Brady, 1987 – North America
- Gnatholycosa Mello-Leitão, 1940 – Argentina
- Gulocosa Marusik, Omelko & Koponen, 2015 – Russia
- Halocosa Azarkina & Trilikauskas, 2019 – Kazakhstan, China, Azerbaijan, Iran, Ukraine, Russia
- Hesperocosa Gertsch & Wallace, 1937 – United States
- Hippasa Simon, 1885 – Africa, Asia
- Hippasella Mello-Leitão, 1944 – Argentina, Bolivia, Peru
- Hippasosa Roewer, 1960 – Asia, Africa to Saudi Arabia
- Hoggicosa Roewer, 1960 – Australia
- Hogna Simon, 1885 – Worldwide
- Hognoides Roewer, 1960 – Tanzania
- Houcosa Wang, Marusik & Zhang, 2025 – China
- Hyaenosa Caporiacco, 1940 – Ethiopia, Rwanda, China
- Hygrolycosa Dahl, 1908 – China, Japan, Korea, Russia, Greece
- Kangarosa Framenau, 2010 – Australia
- Karakumosa Logunov & Ponomarev, 2020 – Asia, Russia
- Katableps Jocqué, Russell-Smith & Alderweireldt, 2011 – Madagascar
- Knoelle Framenau, 2006 – Australia
- Kochosa Framenau, Castanheira & Yoo, 2023 – Australia
- Kuncosa Wang, Marusik & Zhang, 2025 – China, Japan, Korea
- Lobizon Piacentini & Grismado, 2009 – Argentina
- Loculla Simon, 1909 – Congo, São Tomé and Príncipe, Tanzania
- Loongcosa Wang, Marusik & Zhang, 2025 – China
- Lycosa Latreille, 1804 – Worldwide
- Lycosella Thorell, 1890 – Indonesia, Hawaii
- Lynxosa Roewer, 1960 – St. Helena
- Lysania Thorell, 1890 – China, Malaysia, India
- Mainosa Framenau, 2006 – Australia
- Malimbosa Roewer, 1960 – West Africa
- Margonia Hippa & Lehtinen, 1983 – India
- Megarctosa Caporiacco, 1948 – Cameroon, Ethiopia, Algeria, Egypt, Mongolia, Greece
- Melecosa Marusik, Omelko & Koponen, 2015 – Kazakhstan, Kyrgyzstan, China
- Melocosa Gertsch, 1937 – North America, Brazil
- Minicosa Alderweireldt & Jocqué, 2007 – Mozambique, South Africa
- Molearachne Sherwood, Henrard, Logunov & Fowler, 2023 – St. Helena
- Molitorosa Roewer, 1960 – Brazil
- Mongolicosa Marusik, Azarkina & Koponen, 2004 – China, Mongolia, Russia
- Mustelicosa Roewer, 1960 – Turkmenistan, China, Mongolia, Ukraine, Russia
- Navira Piacentini & Grismado, 2009 – Argentina
- Notocosa Vink, 2002 – New Zealand
- Nukuhiva Berland, 1935 – Marquesas Islands
- Oculicosa Zyuzin, 1993 – Kazakhstan, Turkmenistan, Uzbekistan
- Orinocosa Chamberlin, 1916 – Uganda, Egypt, Ivory Coast, Guyana, Peru
- Ovia Sankaran, Malamel & Sebastian, 2017 – Asia
- Pamirosa Fomichev, Omelko & Marusik, 2024 – Kyrgyzstan, Tajikistan
- Pandacosa Wang, Li, Marusik & Zhang, 2026 – China, Bhutan
- Paratrochosina Roewer, 1960 – Russia, Argentina
- Pardosa C. L. Koch, 1847 – Worldwide
- Pardosella Caporiacco, 1939 – Ethiopia, Tanzania
- Passiena Thorell, 1890 – Cameroon, South Africa, China, Southeast Asia
- Pavocosa Roewer, 1960 – Thailand, Argentina, Brazil, Caroline Islands
- Pirata Sundevall, 1833 – Africa, Asia, Europe, North America, Argentina
- Piratula Roewer, 1960 – Asia, Ukraine, Russia, North America
- Portacosa Framenau, 2017 – Australia
- Proevippa Purcell, 1903 – Congo, Southern Africa
- Prolycosides Mello-Leitão, 1942 – Cuba, Puerto Rico, South America
- Pseudevippa Simon, 1910 – Southern Africa
- Pterartoria Purcell, 1903 – Lesotho, South Africa
- Pyrenecosa Marusik, Azarkina & Koponen, 2004 – Switzerland, France, Southern Europe
- Rabidosa Roewer, 1960 – North America
- Satta Lehtinen & Hippa, 1979 – New Guinea
- Schizocosa Chamberlin, 1904 – Africa, Asia, North America, Costa Rica, Panama, South America, Vanuatu
- Serratacosa Wang, Peng & Zhang, 2021 – China, Himalaya
- Shapna Hippa & Lehtinen, 1983 – India
- Sibirocosa Marusik, Azarkina & Koponen, 2004 – Russia
- Sinacosa Wang, Lu & Zhang, 2023 – China
- Sinartoria Wang, Framenau & Zhang, 2021 – China, Vietnam
- Sosippus Simon, 1888 – Guatemala, Mexico, United States
- Spiniculosa Kronestedt, 2025 – Africa
- Syroloma Simon, 1900 – Hawaii
- Tapetosa Framenau, Main, Harvey & Waldock, 2009 – Australia
- Tasmanicosa Roewer, 1959 – Australia
- Tetralycosa Roewer, 1960 – Australia
- Tigrosa Brady, 2012 – North America
- Trabea Simon, 1876 – Africa, Turkey, Spain
- Trabeops Roewer, 1959 – North America
- Trebacosa Dondale & Redner, 1981 – Hungary, Belarus, Greece, France, North America
- Tricassa Simon, 1910 – Madagascar, Namibia, South Africa
- Trochosa C. L. Koch, 1847 – Worldwide
- Tropicosa Paredes-Munguia, Brescovit & Teixeira, 2023 – South America
- Tuberculosa Framenau & Yoo, 2006 – Australia
- Varacosa Chamberlin & Ivie, 1942 – North America
- Venator Hogg, 1900 – Australia
- Venatrix Roewer, 1960 – Philippines, Australia, New Caledonia, New Zealand, Palau
- Venonia Thorell, 1895 – Asia, Australia, New Guinea, Papua New Guinea, Palau
- Vesubia Simon, 1909 – Alps
- Wadicosa Zyuzin, 1985 – Africa, Asia, Macaronesia, Papua New Guinea, North Africa
- Xerolycosa Dahl, 1908 – Tanzania, Asia, Russia
- Zantheres Thorell, 1887 – China, Myanmar
- Zenonina Simon, 1898 – Angola, Ethiopia, Namibia, South Africa
- Zoica Simon, 1898 – Asia, Australia, New Guinea, Papua New Guinea, Marshall Islands, Caroline Islands
- Zyuzicosa Logunov, 2010 – Central Asia

Considered a nomen dubium:

- Phonophilus Ehrenberg, 1831 – Libya

== Gallery ==
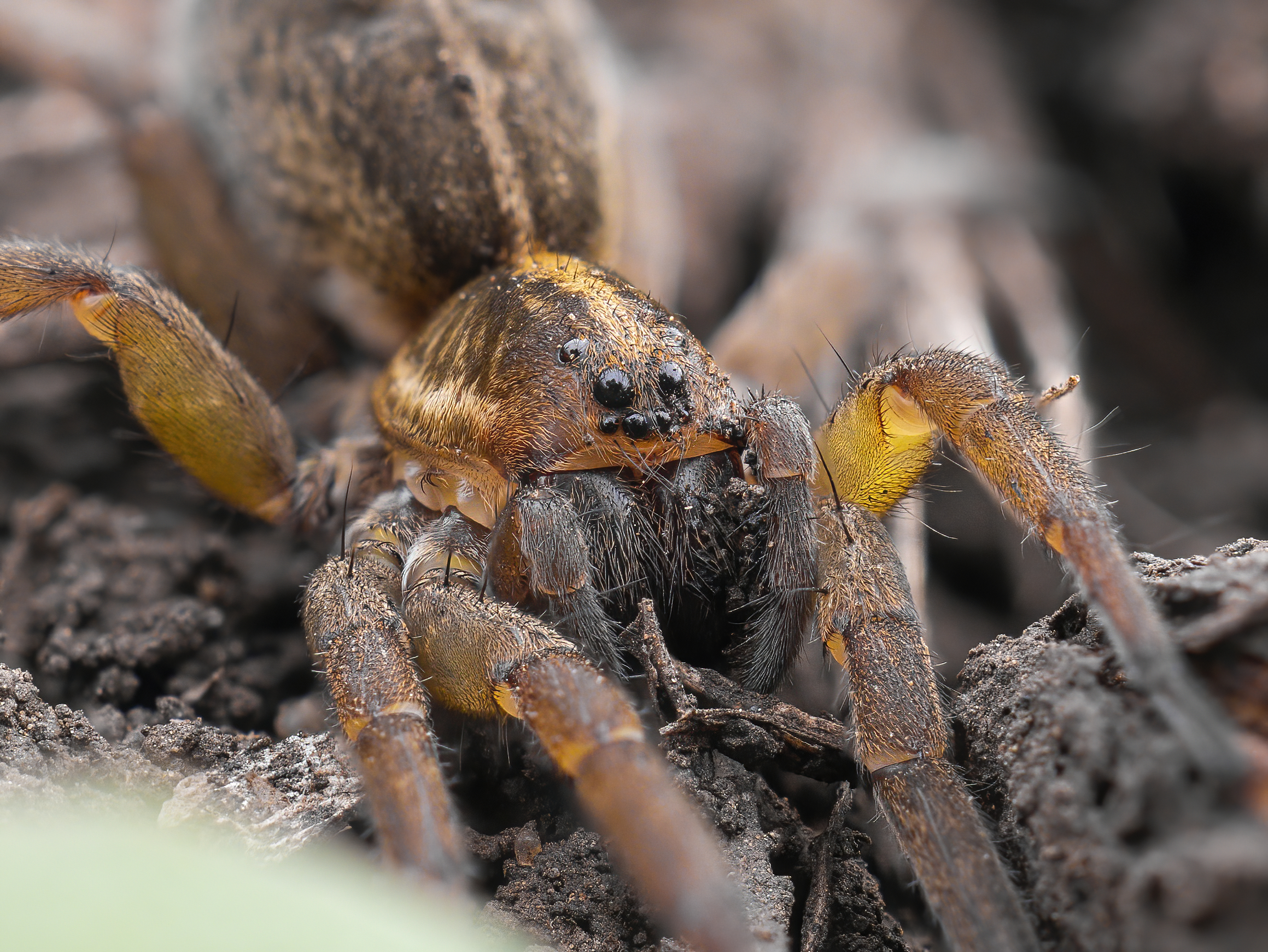
Close-up of Trochosa ruricola

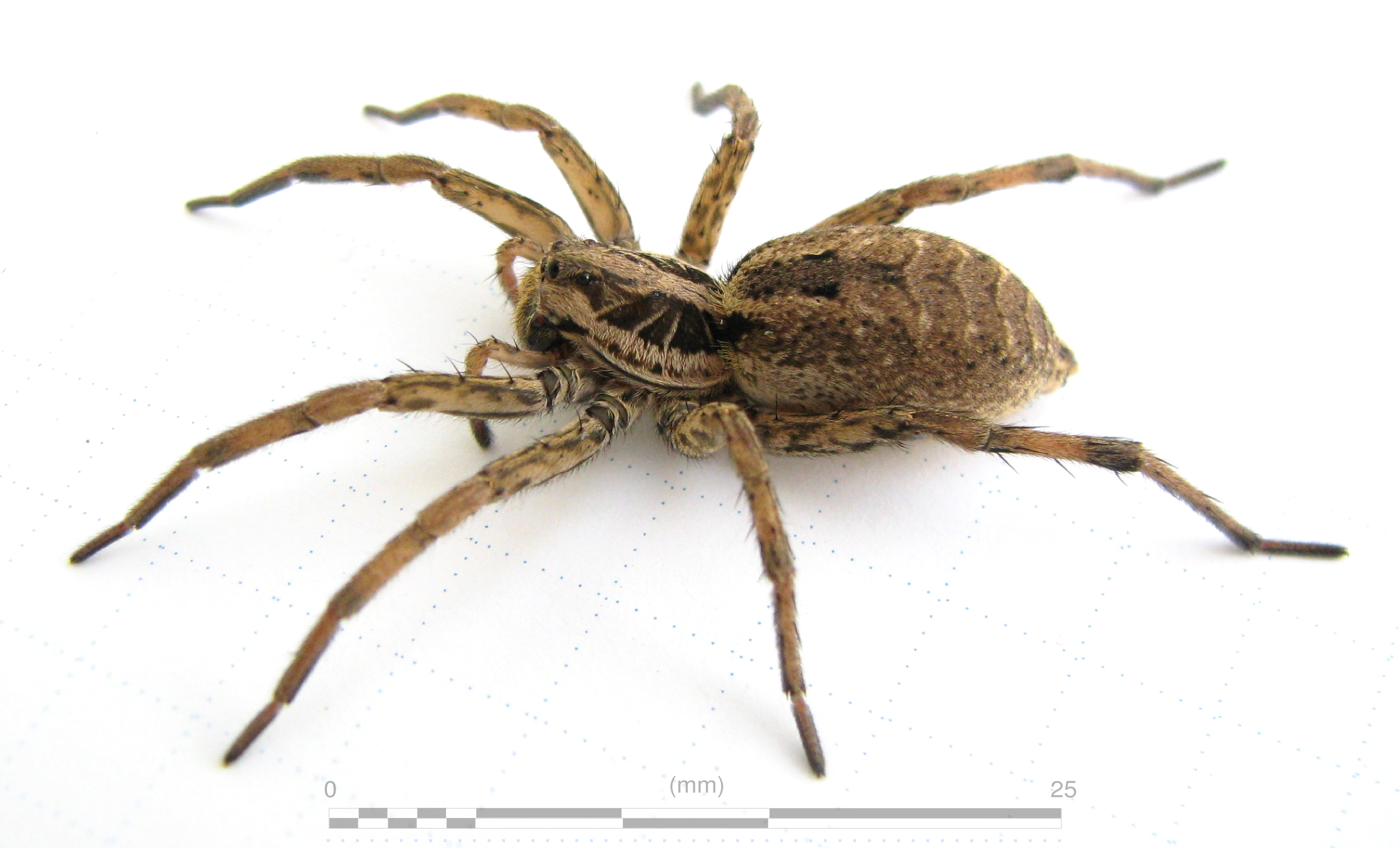
Hogna radiata, adult female

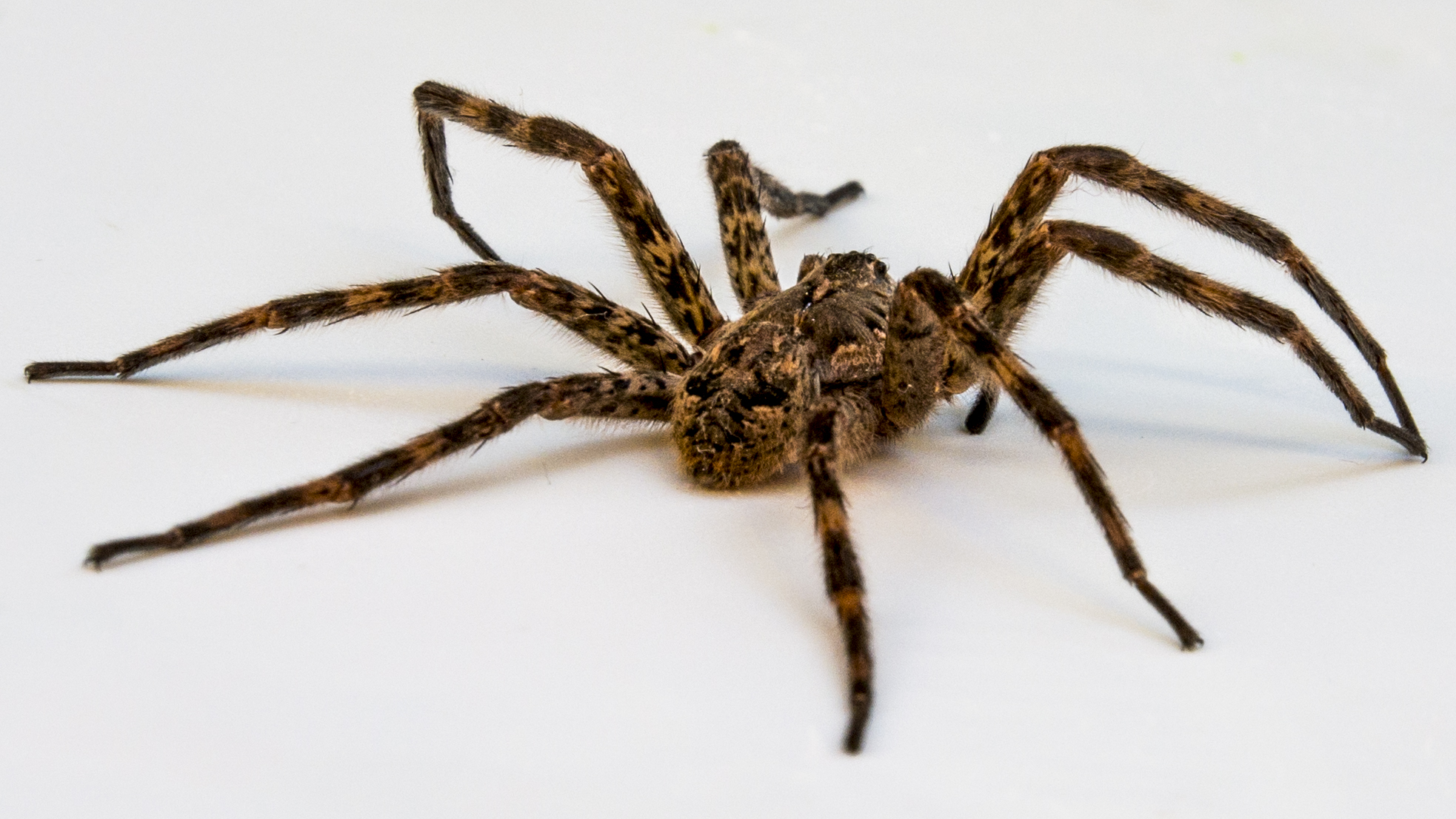
Wolf spider with 3-inch spread

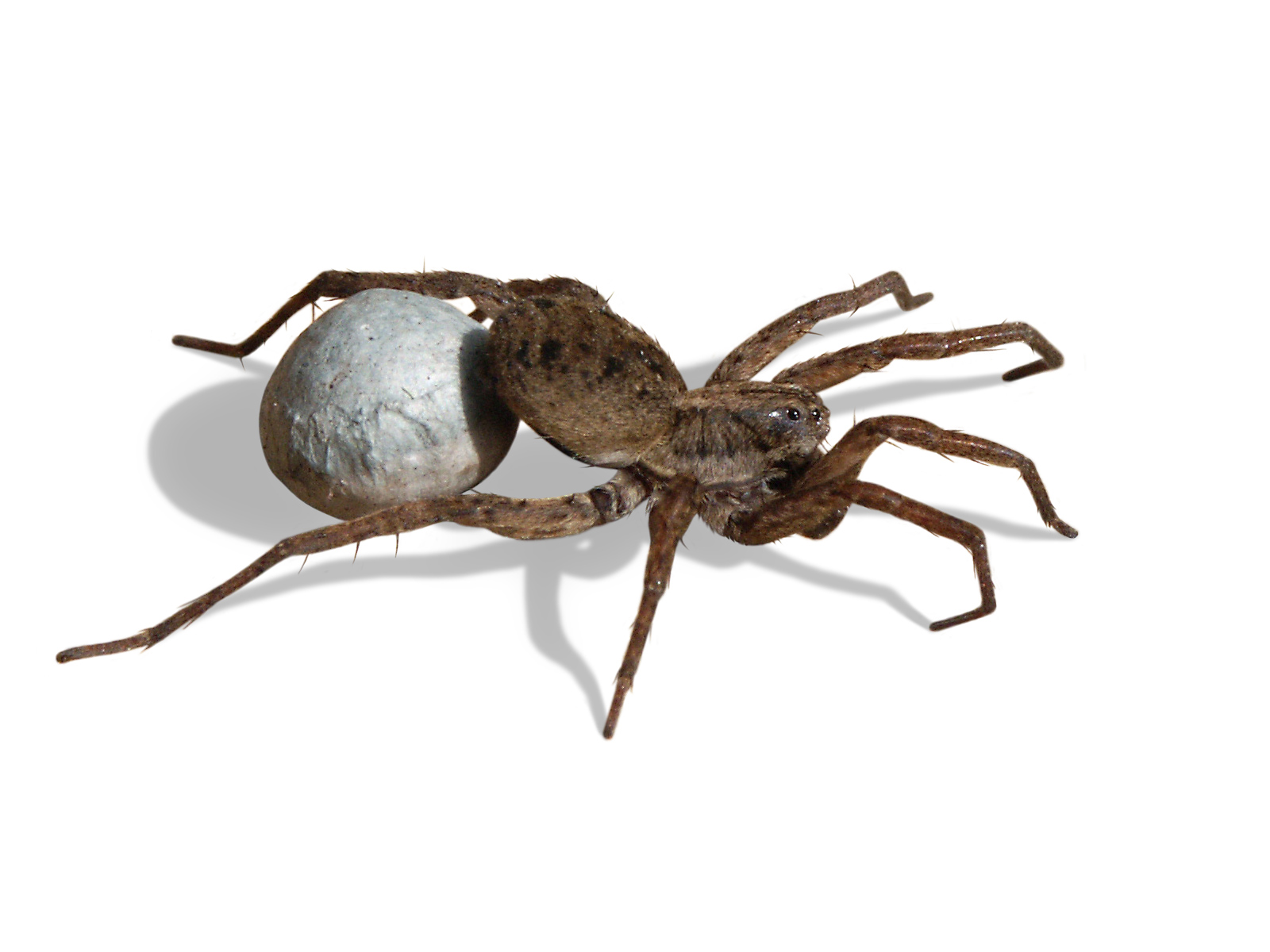
Female with egg sac

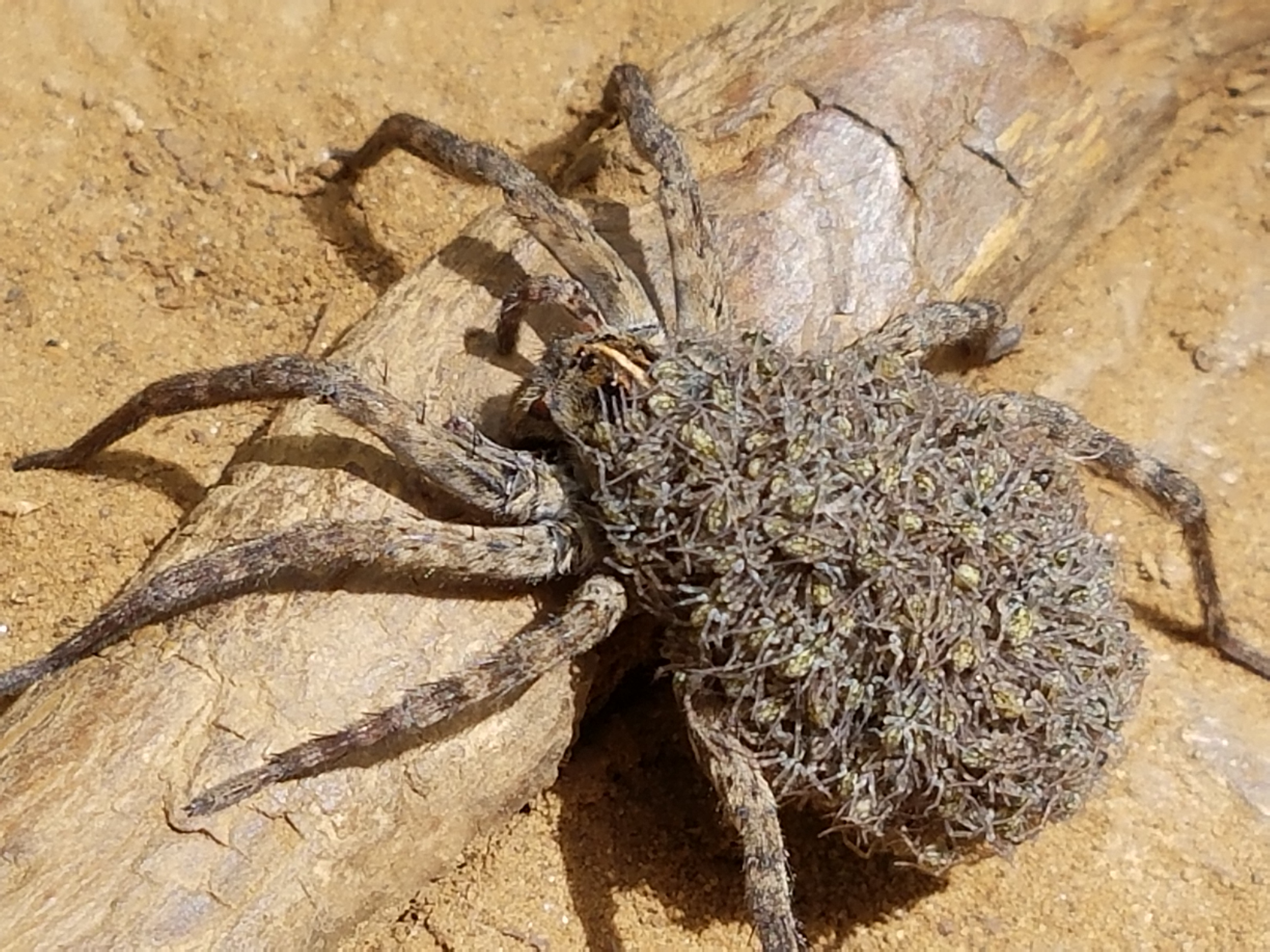
Female with juveniles

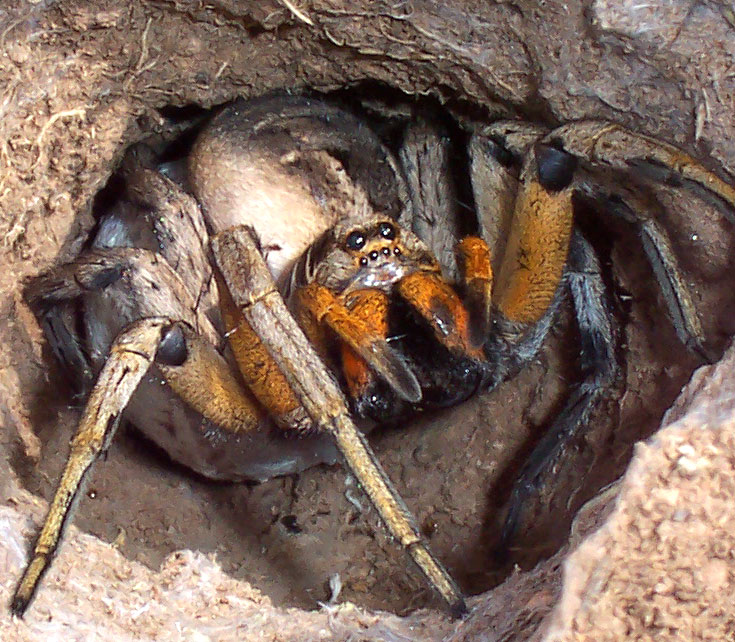
Burrowing wolf spider

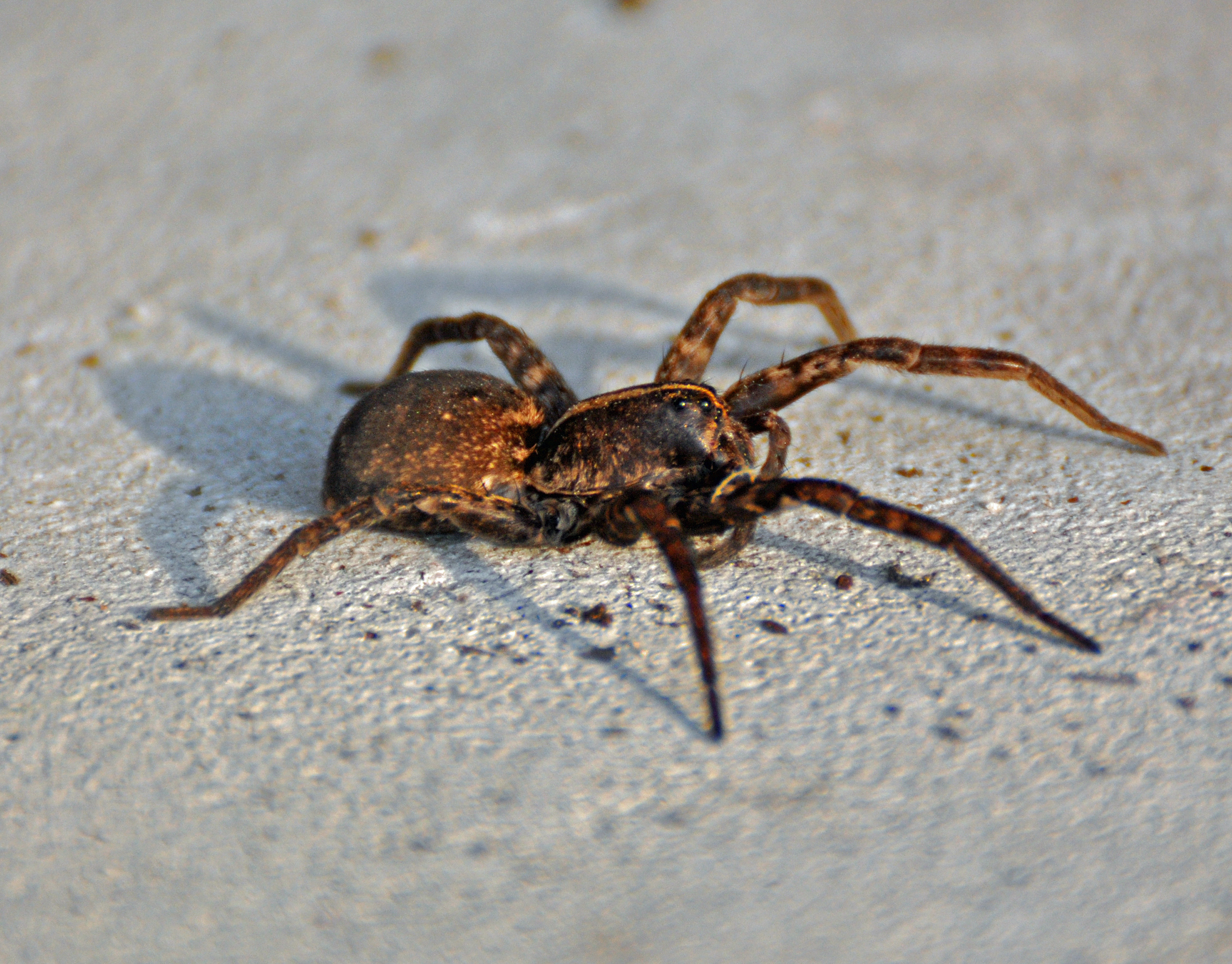
Tigrosa georgicola

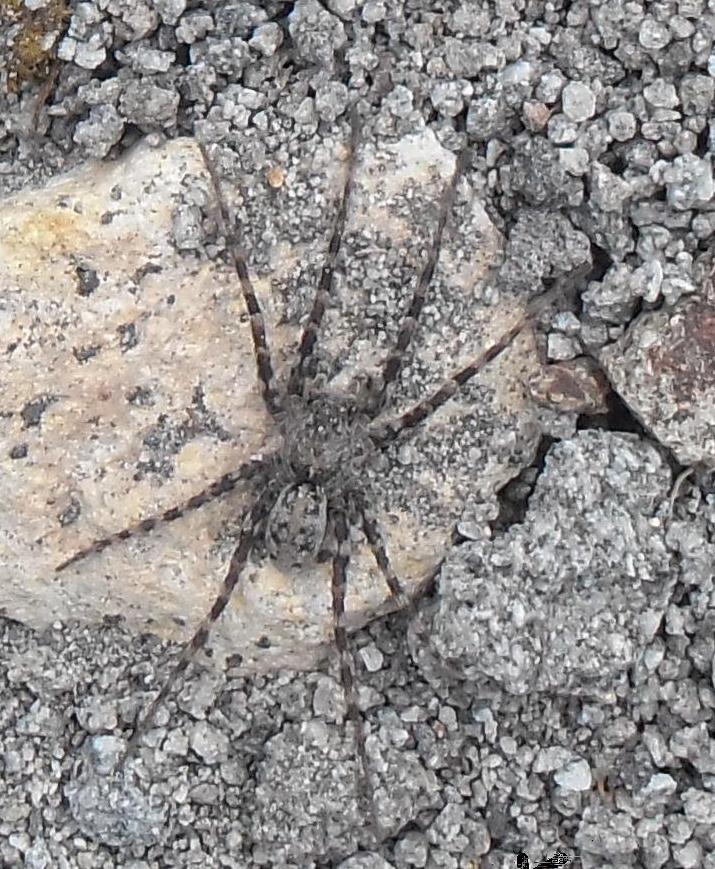
Anoteropsis aerescens

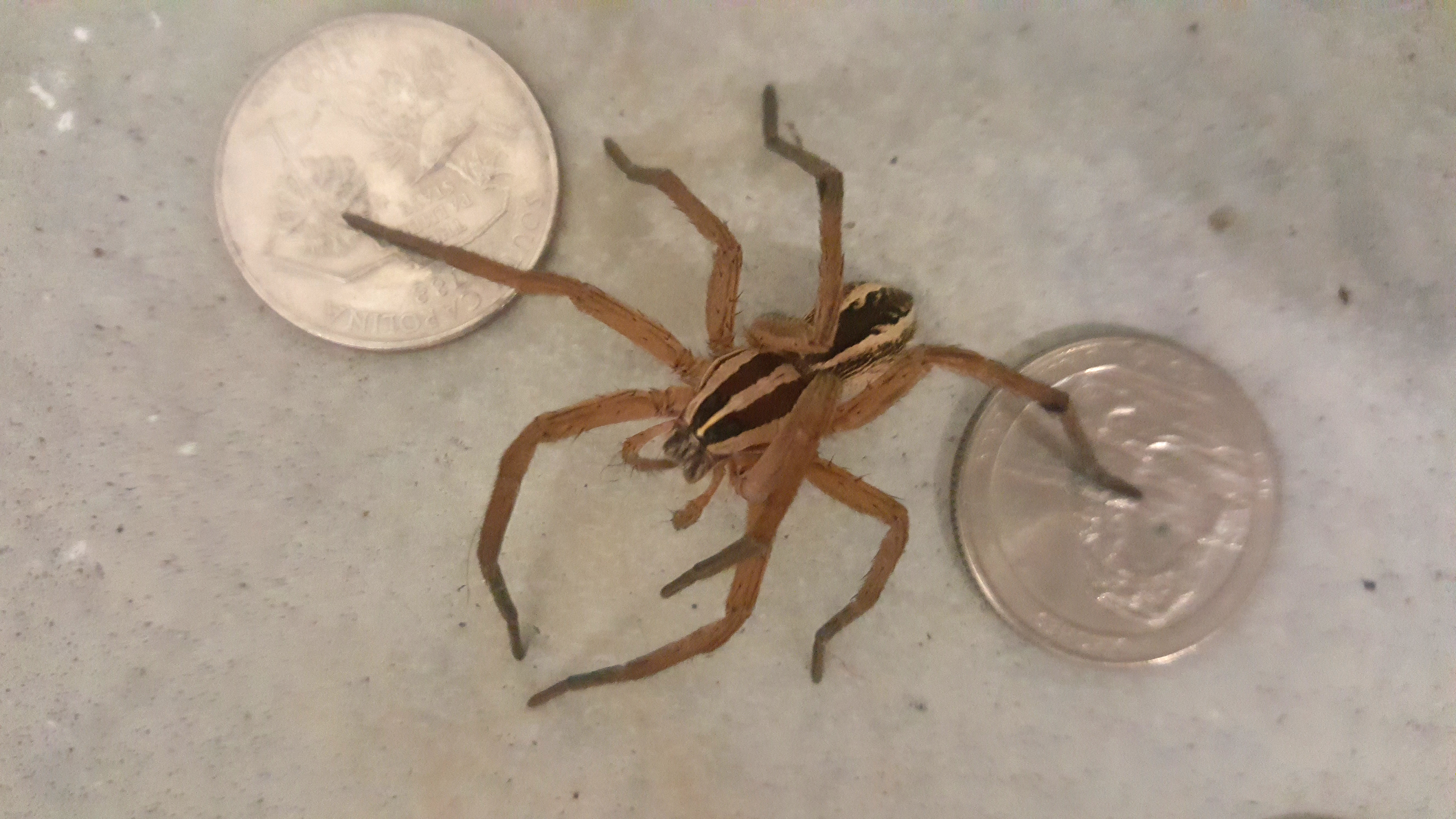
Rabidosa rabida

== See also ==
- List of spiders associated with cutaneous reactions
- Necrobotics
