= Auloniella =

Scientific classification
- Kingdom: Animalia
- Phylum: Arthropoda
- Subphylum: Chelicerata
- Class: Arachnida
- Order: Araneae
- Infraorder: Araneomorphae
- Family: Lycosidae
- Genus: Auloniella
- Species: A. maculisterna

Binomial name
- Auloniella maculisterna Roewer, 1960

Genus of spiders

Auloniella is a genus of spiders in the family Lycosidae. It was first described in 1960 by Roewer. As of 2017, it contains only one species, Auloniella maculisterna, found in Tanzania.
