= Loongcosa =

Scientific classification
- Kingdom: Animalia
- Phylum: Arthropoda
- Subphylum: Chelicerata
- Class: Arachnida
- Order: Araneae
- Infraorder: Araneomorphae
- Family: Lycosidae
- Genus: Loongcosa; Wang, Marusik & Zhang, 2025

Type species
- Pardosa dentitegulum Yin, Peng, Xie, Bao & Wang, 1997

Species
- 2, see text

Genus of spiders

Loongcosa is a genus of spiders in the family Lycosidae (wolf spiders).

== Distribution ==
Loongcosa is only known from China. L. dentitegulum has been collected in Hunan, Guizhou, and Guangxi, with L. wuyiensis known from Anhui, Fujian, Hunan, Guizhou, Shaanxi, and Zhejiang.

== Etymology ==
The genus name is a combination of 龙; lóng ("dragon") and the common wolf spider genus ending "-cosa".

== Species ==
As of January 2026, this genus includes two species:

- Loongcosa dentitegulum (Yin, Peng, Xie, Bao & Wang, 1997) – China
- Loongcosa wuyiensis (Yu & Song, 1988) – China
