= Arctosomma =

Scientific classification
- Kingdom: Animalia
- Phylum: Arthropoda
- Subphylum: Chelicerata
- Class: Arachnida
- Order: Araneae
- Infraorder: Araneomorphae
- Family: Lycosidae
- Genus: Arctosomma; Roewer, 1960
- Species: A. trochosiforme

Binomial name
- Arctosomma trochosiforme (Strand, 1906)

Genus of spiders

Arctosomma is a monotypic genus of spiders in the family Lycosidae. It was first described by Carl Friedrich Roewer in 1960. As of 2023, it contains only one species, Arctosomma trochosiforme, found in Ethiopia.
