= Megarctosa =

Scientific classification
- Kingdom: Animalia
- Phylum: Arthropoda
- Subphylum: Chelicerata
- Class: Arachnida
- Order: Araneae
- Infraorder: Araneomorphae
- Family: Lycosidae
- Genus: Megarctosa; Caporiacco

Species
- 7, see text

Genus of spiders

Megarctosa is a genus of spiders in the family Lycosidae. It was first described in 1948 by Caporiacco. As of 2017, it contains 7 species.

== Species ==
Megarctosa comprises the following species:

- Megarctosa aequioculata (Strand, 1906)
- Megarctosa argentata (Denis, 1947)
- Megarctosa bamiana Roewer, 1960
- Megarctosa caporiaccoi Roewer, 1960
- Megarctosa gobiensis (Schenkel, 1936)
- Megarctosa melanostoma (Mello-Leitão, 1941)
- Megarctosa naccai Caporiacco, 1948
