= Dingosa =

Scientific classification
- Kingdom: Animalia
- Phylum: Arthropoda
- Subphylum: Chelicerata
- Class: Arachnida
- Order: Araneae
- Infraorder: Araneomorphae
- Family: Lycosidae
- Genus: Dingosa; Roewer

Species
- 6, see text

Genus of spiders

Dingosa is a genus of spiders in the family Lycosidae. It was first described in 1955 by Roewer. As of 2017, it contains 6 species from Australia and from South America.

== Species ==
Dingosa comprises the following species:

- Dingosa humphreysi (McKay, 1985)
- Dingosa liopus (Chamberlin, 1916)
- Dingosa murata Framenau & Baehr, 2007
- Dingosa serrata (L. Koch, 1877)
- Dingosa simsoni (Simon, 1898)
- Dingosa venefica (Keyserling, 1891)
