= Molitorosa =

Scientific classification
- Kingdom: Animalia
- Phylum: Arthropoda
- Subphylum: Chelicerata
- Class: Arachnida
- Order: Araneae
- Infraorder: Araneomorphae
- Family: Lycosidae
- Genus: Molitorosa
- Species: M. molitor

Binomial name
- Molitorosa molitor (Bertkau, 1880)

Genus of spiders

Molitorosa is a genus of spiders in the family Lycosidae. It was first described in 1960 by Roewer. As of 2017, it contains only one Brazilian species, Molitorosa molitor.
