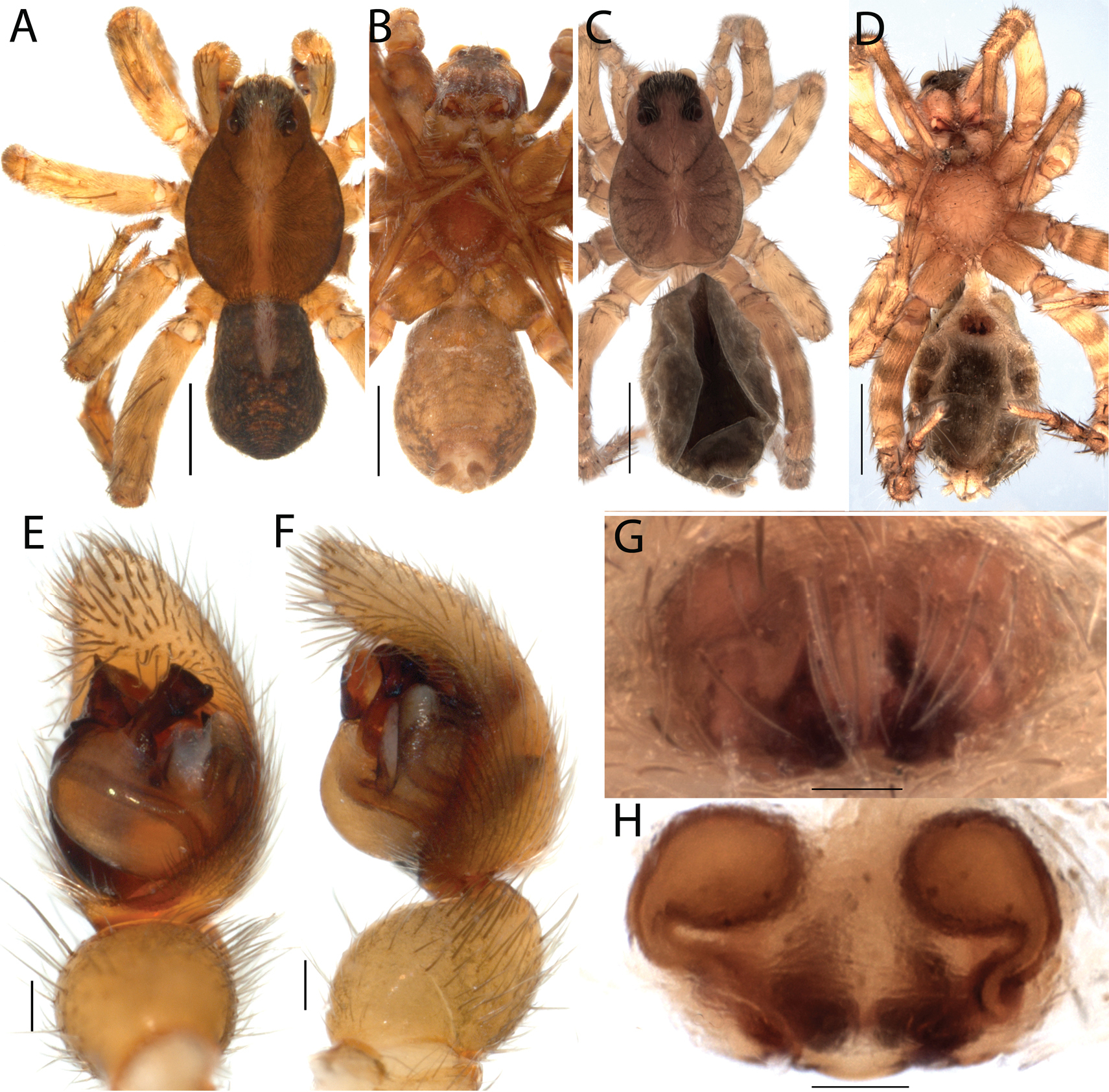
- Figure 9.

Scientific classification
- Kingdom: Animalia
- Phylum: Arthropoda
- Subphylum: Chelicerata
- Class: Arachnida
- Order: Araneae
- Infraorder: Araneomorphae
- Family: Lycosidae
- Genus: Artoria
- Species: A. belfordensis

Binomial name
- Artoria belfordensis Framenau & Baehr, 2018

= Artoria belfordensis =

Species of spider

Holotype (AM KS127759 ♂) site: Belford National Park

Artoria belfordensis, the Belford forest runner, is a spider in the Lycosidae (wolf-spider) family. It was first described in 2018 by Volker Framenau and Barbara Baehr.

It is endemic to Australia and is found in New South Wales in the IBRA regions NSW North Coast (NNC) and Sydney Basin (SB).
