= Ocyale =

Ocyale may refer to:

- an alternative name for the Amazons
- Ocyale (spider), a spider genus in the family Lycosidae
