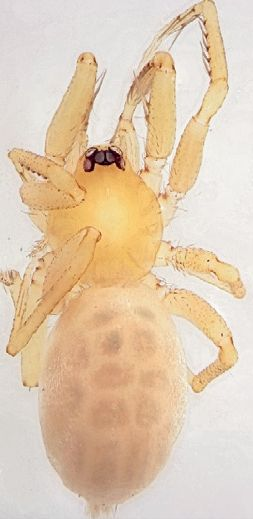
- Female Spinestis nikita

Scientific classification
- Kingdom: Animalia
- Phylum: Arthropoda
- Subphylum: Chelicerata
- Class: Arachnida
- Order: Araneae
- Infraorder: Araneomorphae
- Family: Oonopidae
- Genus: Spinestis; Saaristo & Marusik, 2009
- Species: S. nikita

Binomial name
- Spinestis nikita Saaristo & Marusik, 2009

= Spinestis =

Genus of spiders

Spinestis is a genus of spiders in the family Oonopidae, which resembles Tapinesthis and Megaoonops. The genus has a single species, Spinestis nikita. These are found to be distributed in and around the southern shores of Crimean Peninsula, Ukraine.
