= Hippasosa dewinterae =

Dewinter's Hippasosa Burrowing Wolf Spider

Scientific classification
- Kingdom: Animalia
- Phylum: Arthropoda
- Subphylum: Chelicerata
- Class: Arachnida
- Order: Araneae
- Infraorder: Araneomorphae
- Family: Lycosidae
- Genus: Hippasosa
- Species: H. dewinterae

Binomial name
- Hippasosa dewinterae (Alderweireldt, 1996)

Synonyms
- Ocyale dewinterae Alderweireldt, 1996

Species of spider

Hippasosa dewinterae is a species of spider in the family Lycosidae. It is found in Africa and is commonly known as Dewinter's Hippasosa burrowing wolf spider.

== Distribution ==
Hippasosa dewinterae is found in Malawi, Namibia, and South Africa. In South Africa, it is presently known only from Limpopo at 840 m altitude and is possibly undersampled.

== Habitat and ecology ==
Hippasosa dewinterae inhabits the Savanna biome. These are free running ground spiders that live in burrows.

== Conservation ==
Hippasosa dewinterae is listed as Least Concern by the South African National Biodiversity Institute. Due to its wide range in Africa, it is listed as being of Least Concern. There are no known threats, but additional sampling is needed to determine the distribution range in South Africa.

== Taxonomy ==
Hippasosa dewinterae was originally described by Alderweireldt in 1996 as Ocyale dewinterae from Malawi. The species is known from both sexes. In 2022, Sherwood transferred the species to the genus Hippasosa.
