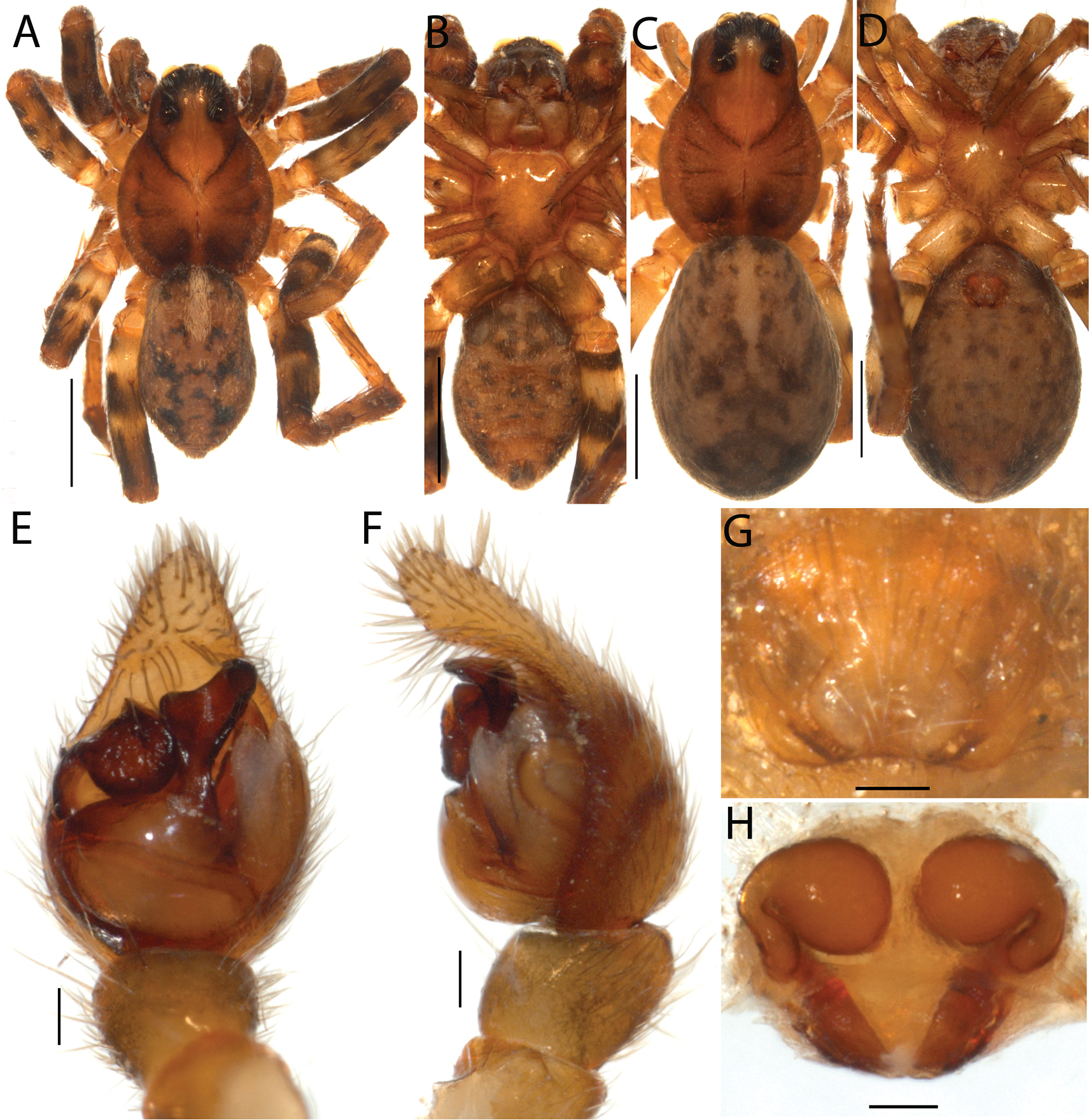
- Figure 7.

Scientific classification
- Kingdom: Animalia
- Phylum: Arthropoda
- Subphylum: Chelicerata
- Class: Arachnida
- Order: Araneae
- Infraorder: Araneomorphae
- Family: Lycosidae
- Genus: Artoria
- Species: A. beaury

Binomial name
- Artoria beaury Framenau & Baehr, 2018

= Artoria beaury =

Species of spider

Type sites(AM KS127757 ♂, AM KS86423 4♂, 3♀) sites: Beaury State Forest & Yabbra Scrub State Forest

Artoria beaury (common name - Beaury forest runner) is a spider in the Lycosidae (wolf-spider) family. It was first described in 2018 by Volker Framenau and Barbara Baehr.

It is endemic to Australia and is found in New South Wales and Queensland.
