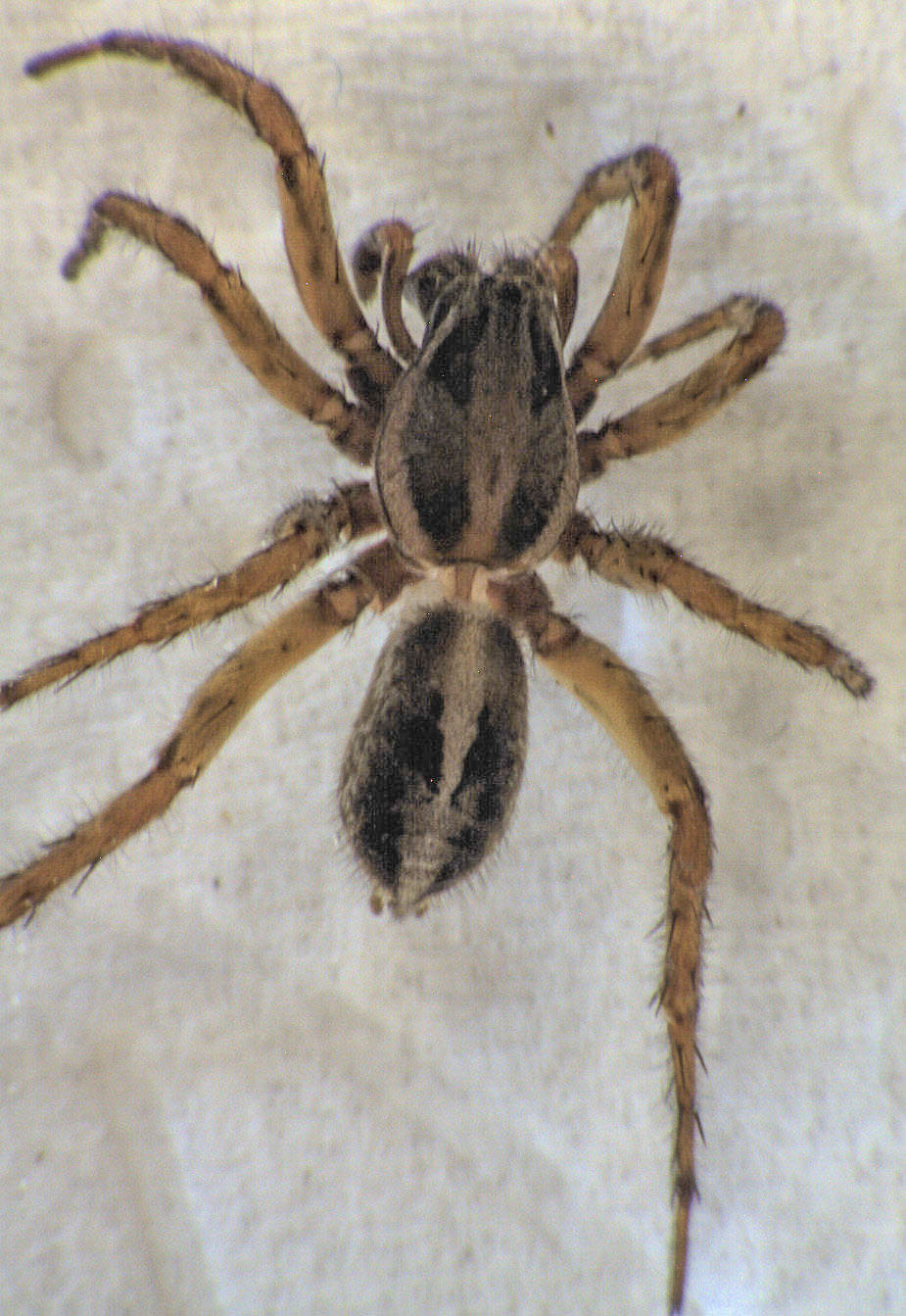
- Artoriopsis expolita

Scientific classification
- Kingdom: Animalia
- Phylum: Arthropoda
- Subphylum: Chelicerata
- Class: Arachnida
- Order: Araneae
- Infraorder: Araneomorphae
- Family: Lycosidae
- Subfamily: Artoriinae; Framenau, 2007

Genera
- See text.

= Artoriinae =

Subfamily of spiders

The Artoriinae are a subfamily of wolf spiders (family Lycosidae). The monophyly of the subfamily has been confirmed in a molecular phylogenetic study, although the relationships among the subfamilies was shown to be less certain.

The core of diversity is in Australia and the rest of Oceania, while Africa, South America, and Southeast Asia each have a few described species.

== Characteristics ==
Artoriinae are distinguished from all other Lycosidae by the presence of an apophysis at the base of the embolus (basoembolic) on the male palpal bulb. This apophysis can be thin and lamellar, as in some Diahogna and Tetralycosa, very strongly sclerotized, as in Artoria, or may have a finger-like protrusion, as in Anoteropsis. The function during copulation is not known.

== Taxonomy ==
The subfamily Artoriinae was first proposed by Volker W. Framenau in 2007 on the basis of a morphological feature of the male palpal bulb. Framenau included eight genera. In 2009, it was suggested that two newly described genera from South America, Lobizon and Navira, belonged in the subfamily. A molecular phylogenetic study in 2019 confirmed the monophyly of the subfamily, and agreed that the South American genera belonged in it.

As of January 2021, there are three African species of Artoria: A. amoena, A. lycosimorpha and A. maculipes. Two were originally described in the genus Artoriella by Carl Friedrich Roewer, who also moved A. lycosimorpha there. The genus Artoriella is now considered a junior synonym of Artoria. However, based on Roewer's descriptions, the African Artoria are more likely to belong to genus Pardosa or a related genus. Until a revision of these species is undertaken, these African species will technically reside in Artoria.

=== Phylogeny ===
A cladogram representing a summary phylogeny of the family Lycosidae was published in 2019. The support for the placement of the subfamilies was variable, although those identified in the study were monophyletic with the exception of Lycosinae, in which Pardosinae was embedded. Framenau in 2007 had suggested a post-Gondwanan origin, i.e. less than 60 million years ago, although the South American species were not then included. The 2019 study estimated that the Artoriinae had diversified around 40 million years ago, in the Eocene.

- Lycosidae
  - - Venoniinae
    - Zoicinae
  - - Evippiinae
    - - Sosippinae
      - - Artoriinae
        - - - Hippasinae
            - Tricassinae
          - - Allocosinae
            - Lycosinae + Pardosinae

=== Genera ===
Eight genera were placed in the subfamily in 2007. Two more were added later. (The distributions given below are from the World Spider Catalog.)

- Anoteropsis L. Koch, 1878 — New Zealand, with one Polynesian species
- Artoria Thorell, 1877 — Australasia to China (however, see Taxonomy)
- Artoriopsis Framenau, 2007 — Australia
- Diahogna Roewer, 1960 — Australia
- Lycosella Thorell, 1890 — Hawaii, Sumatra
- Lobizon Piacentini & Grismado, 2009 – Argentina
- Navira Piacentini & Grismado, 2009 – Argentina
- Notocosa Vink, 2002 — New Zealand
- Syroloma Simon, 1900 — Hawaii
- Tetralycosa Roewer, 1960 — Australia

Two genera unnamed in 2007 with sixteen known species also belong to this subfamily.

== Distribution ==
Artoriinae have an unusual distribution. They are mainly found in Australia and the Pacific northwards to southeast China. They are widespread and diverse in Australia. Two genera with six species are found in South America. Species found in Africa were assumed to be misplaced in the genus Artoria.

== See also ==
- List of Lycosidae genera
