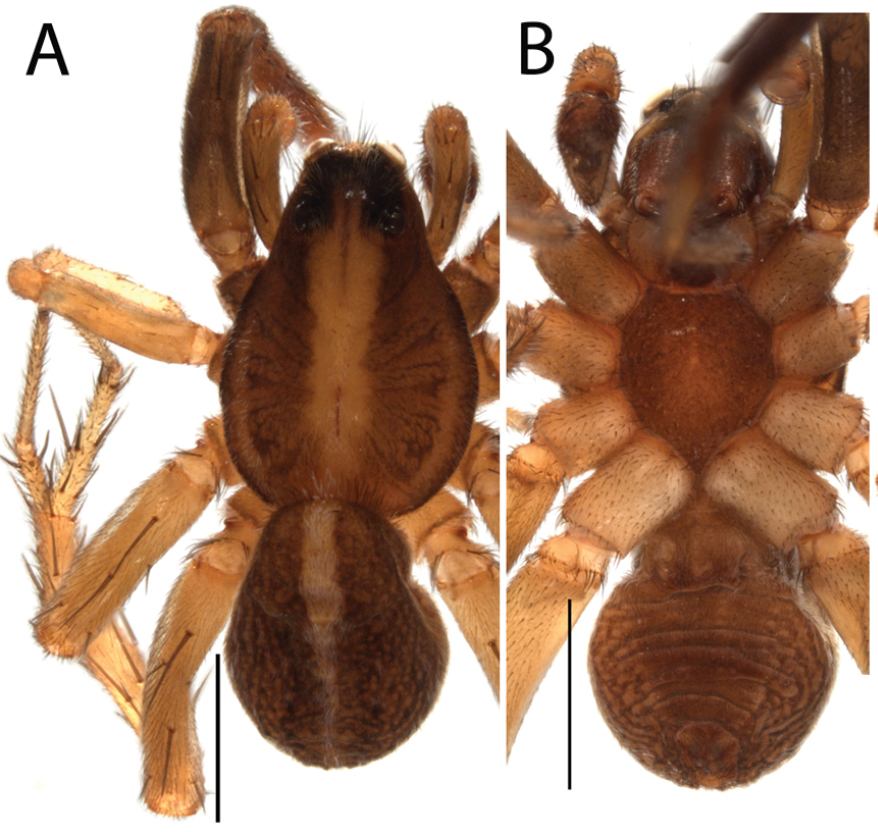

Scientific classification
- Kingdom: Animalia
- Phylum: Arthropoda
- Subphylum: Chelicerata
- Class: Arachnida
- Order: Araneae
- Infraorder: Araneomorphae
- Family: Lycosidae
- Genus: Artoria
- Species: A. barringtonensis

Binomial name
- Artoria barringtonensis Framenau & Baehr, 2018

= Artoria barringtonensis =

Species of spider

Holotype (AM KS122794) site: Barrington Tops National Park

Artoria barringtonensis is a spider in the Lycosidae (wolf-spider) family. It was first described in 2018 by Volker Framenau and Barbara Baehr.

It is endemic to Australia and is known only from its type locality in Barrington Tops National Park.
