= Lobizon =

Scientific classification
- Kingdom: Animalia
- Phylum: Arthropoda
- Subphylum: Chelicerata
- Class: Arachnida
- Order: Araneae
- Infraorder: Araneomorphae
- Family: Lycosidae
- Subfamily: Artoriinae
- Genus: Lobizon; Piacentini & Grismado, 2009

Species
- Lobizon corondaensis (Mello-Leitão, 1941) (type); Lobizon humilis (Mello-Leitão, 1944); Lobizon minor (Mello-Leitão, 1941); Lobizon ojangureni Piacentini & Grismado, 2009; Lobizon otamendi Piacentini & Grismado, 2009

Genus of spiders

Lobizon is a genus of spiders in the family Lycosidae. It was first described in 2009 by Piacentini & Grismado. As of 2017, it contains 5 species, all from Argentina.
