= Lycosella =

Scientific classification
- Kingdom: Animalia
- Phylum: Arthropoda
- Subphylum: Chelicerata
- Class: Arachnida
- Order: Araneae
- Infraorder: Araneomorphae
- Family: Lycosidae
- Subfamily: Artoriinae
- Genus: Lycosella; Thorell

Species
- Lycosella annulata Simon, 1900; Lycosella minuta Thorell, 1890; Lycosella spinipes Simon, 1900; Lycosella tenera Thorell, 1890; Lycosella tenera bisulcata Thorell, 1890

Genus of spiders

Lycosella is a genus of spiders in the family Lycosidae. It was first described in 1890 by Thorell. As of 2017, it contains 5 species found in Hawaii and Sumatra.
