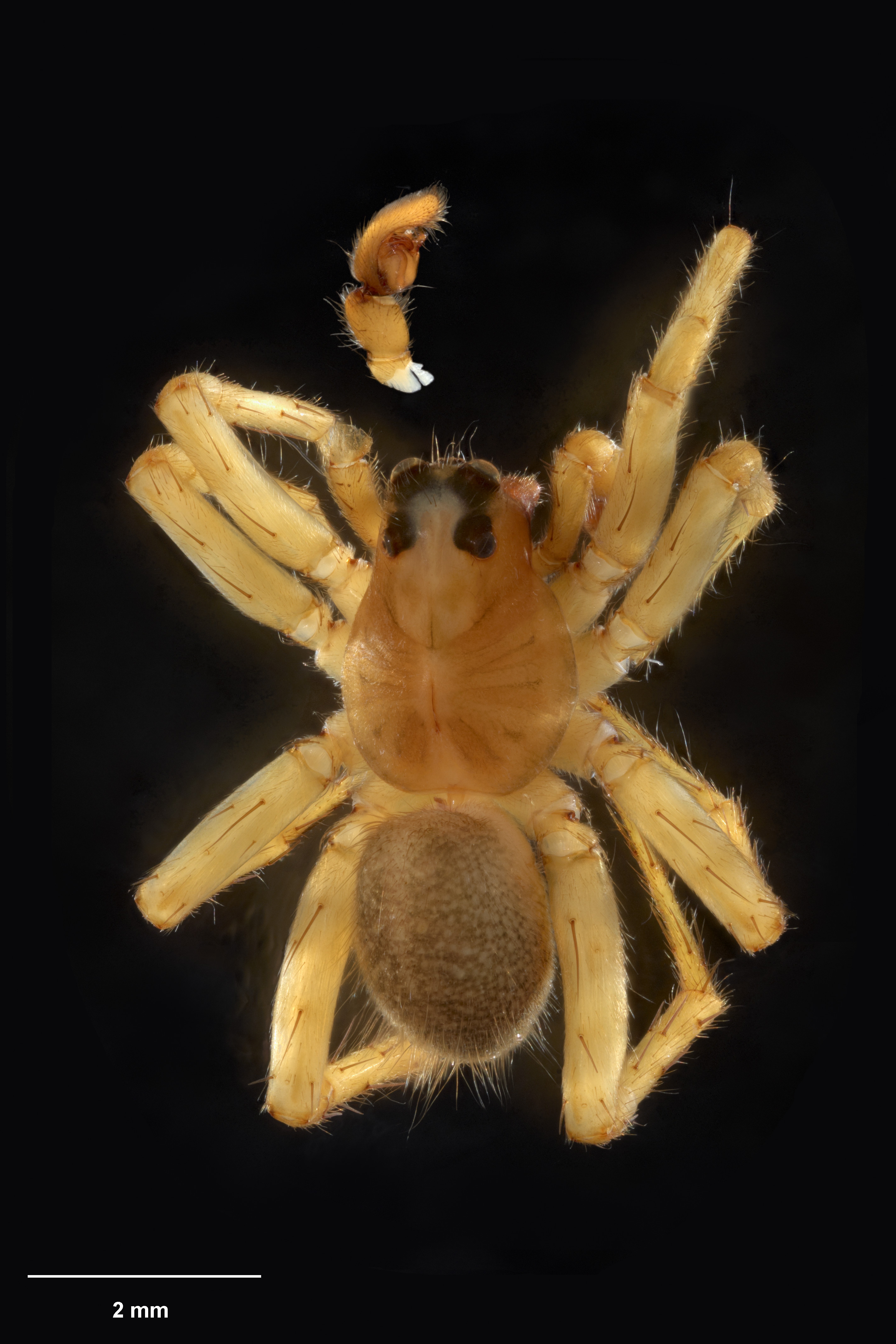

Conservation status
- Not Threatened (NZ TCS)

Scientific classification
- Kingdom: Animalia
- Phylum: Arthropoda
- Subphylum: Chelicerata
- Class: Arachnida
- Order: Araneae
- Infraorder: Araneomorphae
- Family: Lycosidae
- Genus: Artoria
- Species: A. hospita

Binomial name
- Artoria hospita Vink, 2002

= Artoria hospita =

Species of spider

Artoria hospita is a species of Lycosidae spider that is endemic to New Zealand.

== Taxonomy ==
This species was described in 2002 by Cor Vink from male and female specimens. The holotype is stored in Te Papa Museum under registration number AS.000876.

== Description ==
The male is recorded at 5.1-6.2mm in length whereas the female is 4.3-8.0mm. The carapace is coloured orange brown with faint black stripes originating from the fovea and black marks around the eyes. The legs are yellow brown with faint dark bands. The abdomen is orange brown with brownish blotches and a dorsal heart stripe.

== Distribution ==
This species is only known from the northern half of New Zealand's North Island. They are usually found in and around forests.

== Conservation status ==
Under the New Zealand Threat Classification System, this species is listed as "Not Threatened".
