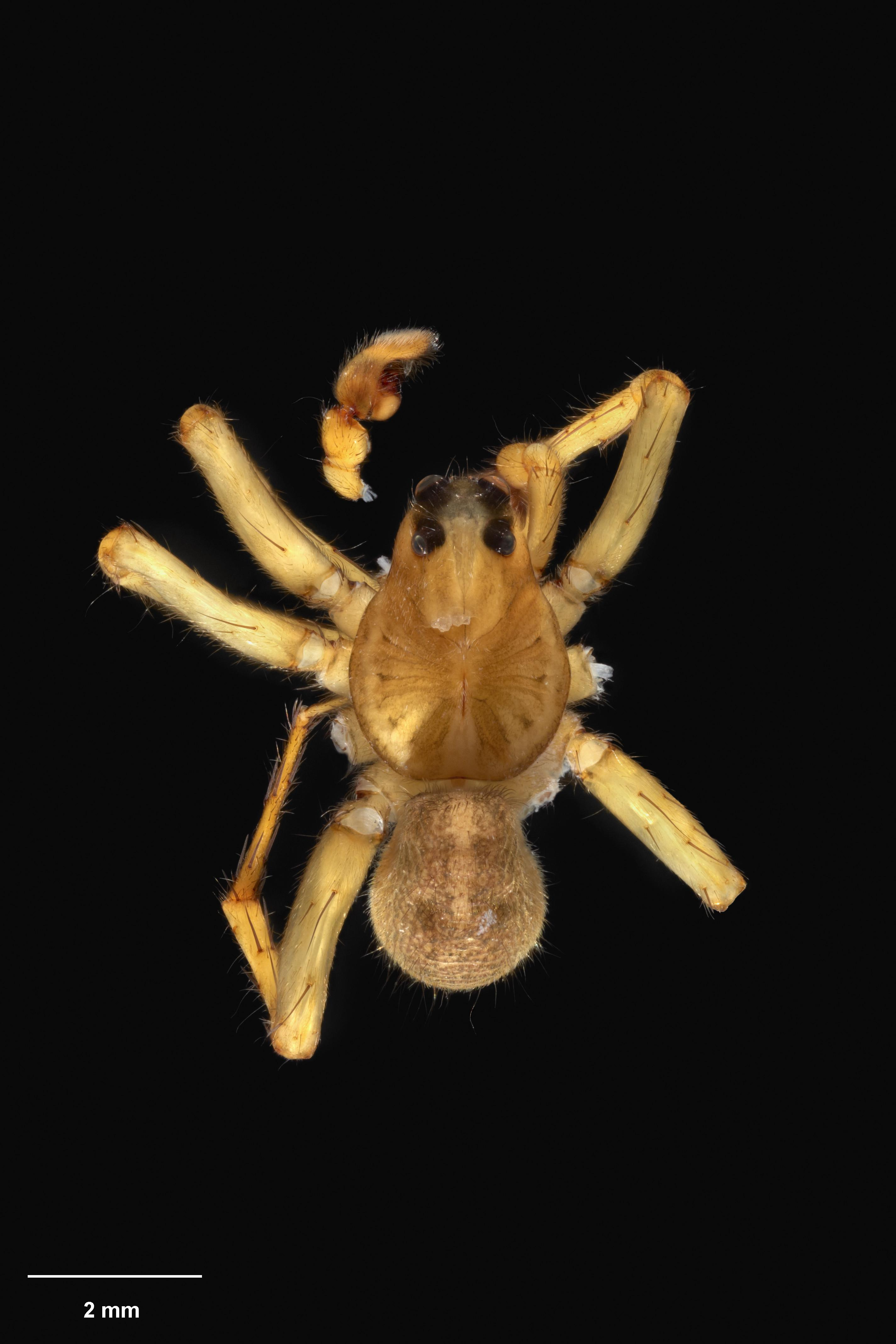

Conservation status
- Not Threatened (NZ TCS)

Scientific classification
- Kingdom: Animalia
- Phylum: Arthropoda
- Subphylum: Chelicerata
- Class: Arachnida
- Order: Araneae
- Infraorder: Araneomorphae
- Family: Lycosidae
- Genus: Artoria
- Species: A. separata

Binomial name
- Artoria separata Vink, 2002

= Artoria separata =

Species of spider

Artoria separata is a species of Lycosidae spider that is endemic to New Zealand.

== Taxonomy ==
This species was described in 2002 by Cor Vink from male and female specimens. The species name is derived from "separatus", which is Latin for separated. This is in reference to its separation from other species of Artoria, which are mostly found in Australia. The holotype is stored in Te Papa Museum under registration number AS.000875.

== Description ==
The male is recorded at 4.6-6mm in length whereas the female is 5.8-7.3mm. The carapace is coloured orange brown with blackish stripes originating from the fovea and blackish areas around the eyes. The legs are yellow brown to orange brown with faint dark bands. The abdomen is coloured orange brown with brown blotches and a faint heart stripe dorsally. It is best distinguished from other Artoria species by minor differences in the structure of the male and female genitalia.

== Distribution and habitat ==
This species occurs in the north west of New Zealand's North Island. It is known to occur in forest leaf litter. Adults occur throughout the year and egg sacs have been observed in December.

== Conservation status ==
Under the New Zealand Threat Classification System, this species is listed as "Not Threatened".
