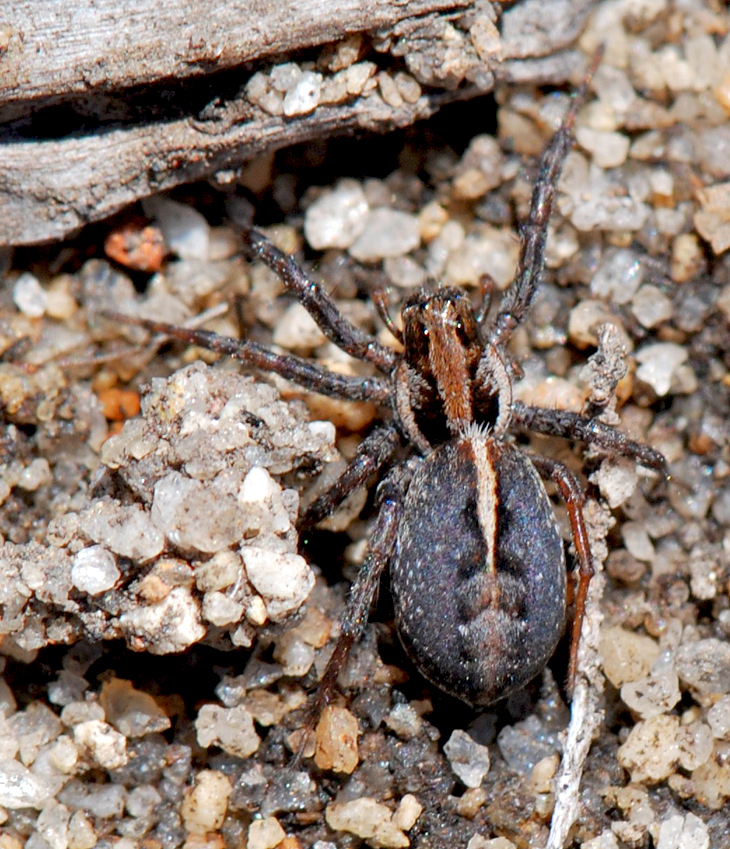
- Artoria sp.
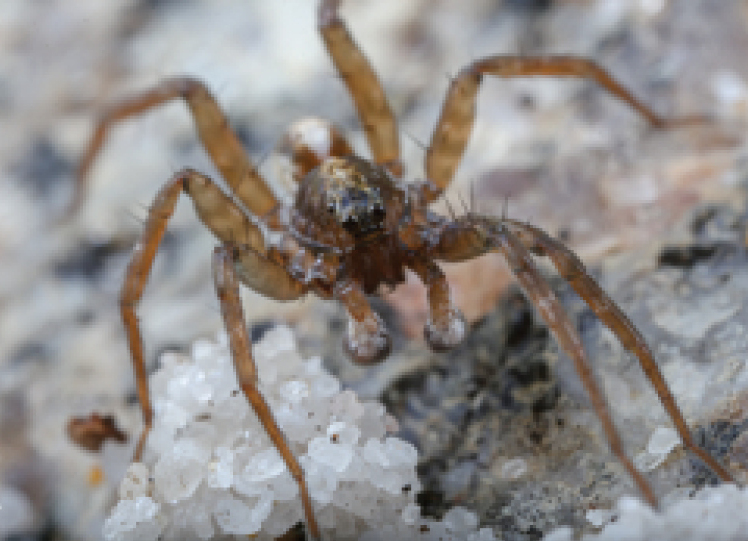
- A. mckayi

Scientific classification
- Kingdom: Animalia
- Phylum: Arthropoda
- Subphylum: Chelicerata
- Class: Arachnida
- Order: Araneae
- Infraorder: Araneomorphae
- Family: Lycosidae
- Subfamily: Artoriinae
- Genus: Artoria; Thorell

= Artoria =

Genus of spiders

Artoria is a genus of spiders in the family Lycosidae. It was first described in 1877 by Tamerlan Thorell, and the type species is Artoria parvula. In 1960, Roewer erected the genera Artoriella and Trabeola. However, in 2002, Volker Framenau reviewed Artoria and synonymised both these genera with Artoria.

== Distribution ==
Species of this genus are widespread throughout south-east Asia and found in all states and territories of Australia.

== Description ==
Artoria are small to medium-sized wolf spiders with a total length of approximately 3 to 10 mm, with males slightly smaller than females. The carapace is brown to black with a darker radial pattern, and light median and lateral bands are sometimes present.

The abdomen is brown to dark grey, often with a mottled pattern and mostly with a light lanceolate heart mark. The carapace is longer than wide with a straight dorsal profile in lateral view. The head flanks in frontal view are steep in most males but may have a gentle slope in females.

Chelicerae bear three (rarely one or two) promarginal and three (rarely one or two) retromarginal teeth. The labium is as long as or slightly longer than wide.

== Taxonomy ==
Framenau (2002) regarded the three African species as incertae sedis.

== Species ==
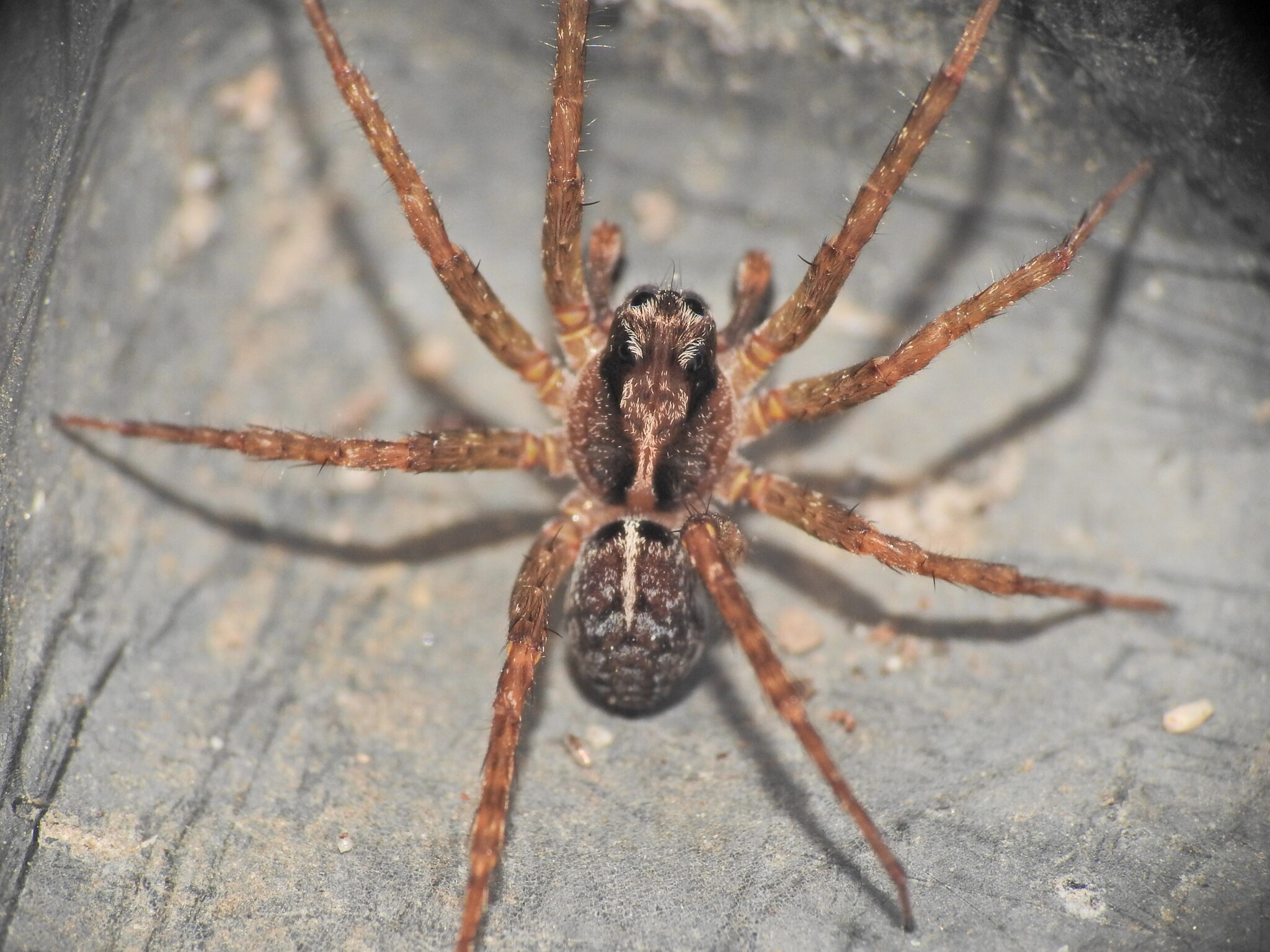
A. grahammilledgei

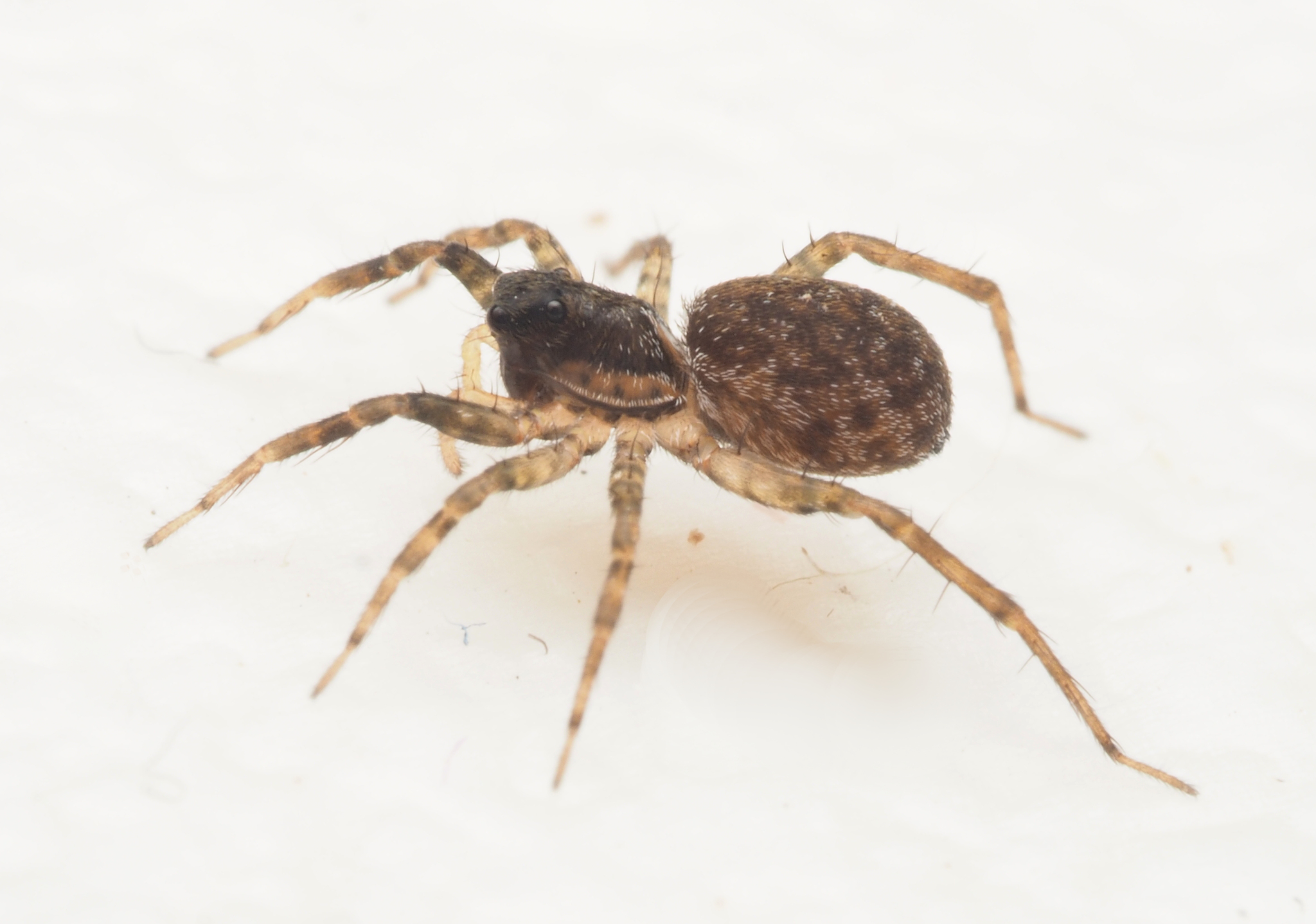
A. howqaensis

As of October 2025, this genus included 68 species:

- Artoria aculeata do Prado, Baptista & Framenau, 2024 – Australia (Western Australia, South Australia)
- Artoria albopedipalpis Framenau, 2002 – Australia (Victoria)
- Artoria albopilata (Urquhart, 1893) – Australia (Queensland to South Australia and Tasmania)
- Artoria alta Framenau, 2004 – Australia (New South Wales)
- Artoria amoena (Roewer, 1960) – DR Congo
- Artoria atrata do Prado, Baptista & Framenau, 2024 – Australia (Western Australia)
- Artoria avona Framenau, 2002 – Australia (South Australia, Victoria)
- Artoria barringtonensis Framenau & Baehr, 2018 – Australia (New South Wales)
- Artoria beaury Framenau & Baehr, 2018 – Australia (New South Wales)
- Artoria belfordensis Framenau & Baehr, 2018 – Australia (New South Wales)
- Artoria berenice (L. Koch, 1877) – Australia (Queensland to Tasmania), New Caledonia, Vanuatu
- Artoria bondi Framenau & Baehr, 2018 – Australia (New South Wales)
- Artoria booderee Framenau & Baehr, 2018 – Australia (New South Wales)
- Artoria cingulipes Simon, 1909 – Australia (Western Australia, South Australia)
- Artoria comleroi Framenau & Baehr, 2018 – Australia (New South Wales)
- Artoria corowa Framenau & Baehr, 2018 – Australia (New South Wales)
- Artoria emu do Prado, Baptista & Framenau, 2024 – Australia (Western Australia)
- Artoria equipalus Framenau & Baehr, 2018 – Australia (New South Wales)
- Artoria extraordinaria Framenau & Baehr, 2018 – Australia (New South Wales)
- Artoria falcata do Prado, Baptista & Framenau, 2024 – Australia (Western Australia)
- Artoria flavimana Simon, 1909 – Australia (Western Australia, South Australia, New South Wales, Victoria, Tasmania)
- Artoria gloriosa (Rainbow, 1920) – Australia (Lord Howe Is.)
- Artoria grahammilledgei Framenau & Baehr, 2018 – Australia (Queensland, New South Wales)
- Artoria hamata Wang, Framenau & Zhang, 2021 – China
- Artoria hebridisiana (Berland, 1938) – Vanuatu
- Artoria helensmithae Framenau & Baehr, 2018 – Australia (New South Wales, Victoria)
- Artoria hospita Vink, 2002 – New Zealand
- Artoria howquaensis Framenau, 2002 – Australia (South Australia, New South Wales, Victoria)
- Artoria impedita (Simon, 1909) – Australia (Western Australia)
- Artoria incrassata do Prado, Baptista & Framenau, 2024 – Australia (Western Australia)
- Artoria inversa do Prado, Baptista & Framenau, 2024 – Australia (Western Australia)
- Artoria kanangra Framenau & Baehr, 2018 – Australia (New South Wales)
- Artoria kerewong Framenau & Baehr, 2018 – Australia (New South Wales)
- Artoria lamellata do Prado, Baptista & Framenau, 2024 – Australia (Western Australia)
- Artoria ligulacea (Qu, Peng & Yin, 2009) – China
- Artoria lineata (L. Koch, 1877) – Australia (South Australia, New South Wales to Tasmania)
- Artoria linnaei Framenau, 2008 – Australia (Western Australia)
- Artoria lycosimorpha Strand, 1909 – South Africa
- Artoria maculatipes (Roewer, 1960) – Namibia
- Artoria maroota Framenau & Baehr, 2018 – Australia (New South Wales)
- Artoria mckayi Framenau, 2002 – Australia (Queensland and South Australia to Tasmania)
- Artoria minima (Berland, 1938) – Vanuatu
- Artoria mungo Framenau & Baehr, 2018 – Australia (New South Wales)
- Artoria munmorah Framenau & Baehr, 2018 – Australia (New South Wales)
- Artoria myallensis Framenau & Baehr, 2018 – Australia (New South Wales)
- Artoria palustris Dahl, 1908 – New Guinea (Indonesia, Papua New Guinea/Bismarck Arch.)
- Artoria parvula Thorell, 1877 – China, Malaysia (peninsula, Borneo), Philippines, Indonesia (Sulawesi), Australia (Northern Territory) (type species)
- Artoria pileata do Prado, Baptista & Framenau, 2024 – Australia (Western Australia)
- Artoria pinnata do Prado, Baptista & Framenau, 2024 – Australia (Western Australia)
- Artoria plicata do Prado, Baptista & Framenau, 2024 – Australia (Western Australia)
- Artoria quadrata Framenau, 2002 – Australia (Queensland, New South Wales, Victoria)
- Artoria retorta do Prado, Baptista & Framenau, 2024 – Australia (Western Australia)
- Artoria schizocoides Framenau & Hebets, 2007 – Australia (Western Australia)
- Artoria segrega Vink, 2002 – New Zealand
- Artoria separata Vink, 2002 – New Zealand
- Artoria slatyeri Framenau & Baehr, 2018 – Australia (New South Wales)
- Artoria strepera Framenau & Baehr, 2018 – Australia (New South Wales)
- Artoria subhamata Wang & Zhang, 2022 – China
- Artoria taeniata do Prado, Baptista & Framenau, 2024 – Australia (Western Australia)
- Artoria taeniifera Simon, 1909 – Australia (Western Australia, South Australia, New South Wales)
- Artoria terania Framenau & Baehr, 2018 – Australia (Queensland, New South Wales)
- Artoria thorelli (Berland, 1929) – Samoa, Marquesas Is.
- Artoria triangularis Framenau, 2002 – Australia (South Australia and Queensland to Tasmania)
- Artoria trifida do Prado, Baptista & Framenau, 2024 – Australia (Western Australia, South Australia)
- Artoria ulrichi Framenau, 2002 – Australia (New South Wales, Victoria)
- Artoria victoriensis Framenau, Gotch & Austin, 2006 – Australia (South Australia and Queensland to Tasmania)
- Artoria weiweii Wang, Zhang & Peng, 2019 – Malaysia (Borneo)
- Artoria wilkiei Framenau & Baehr, 2018 – Australia (Western Australia, South Australia, New South Wales)
