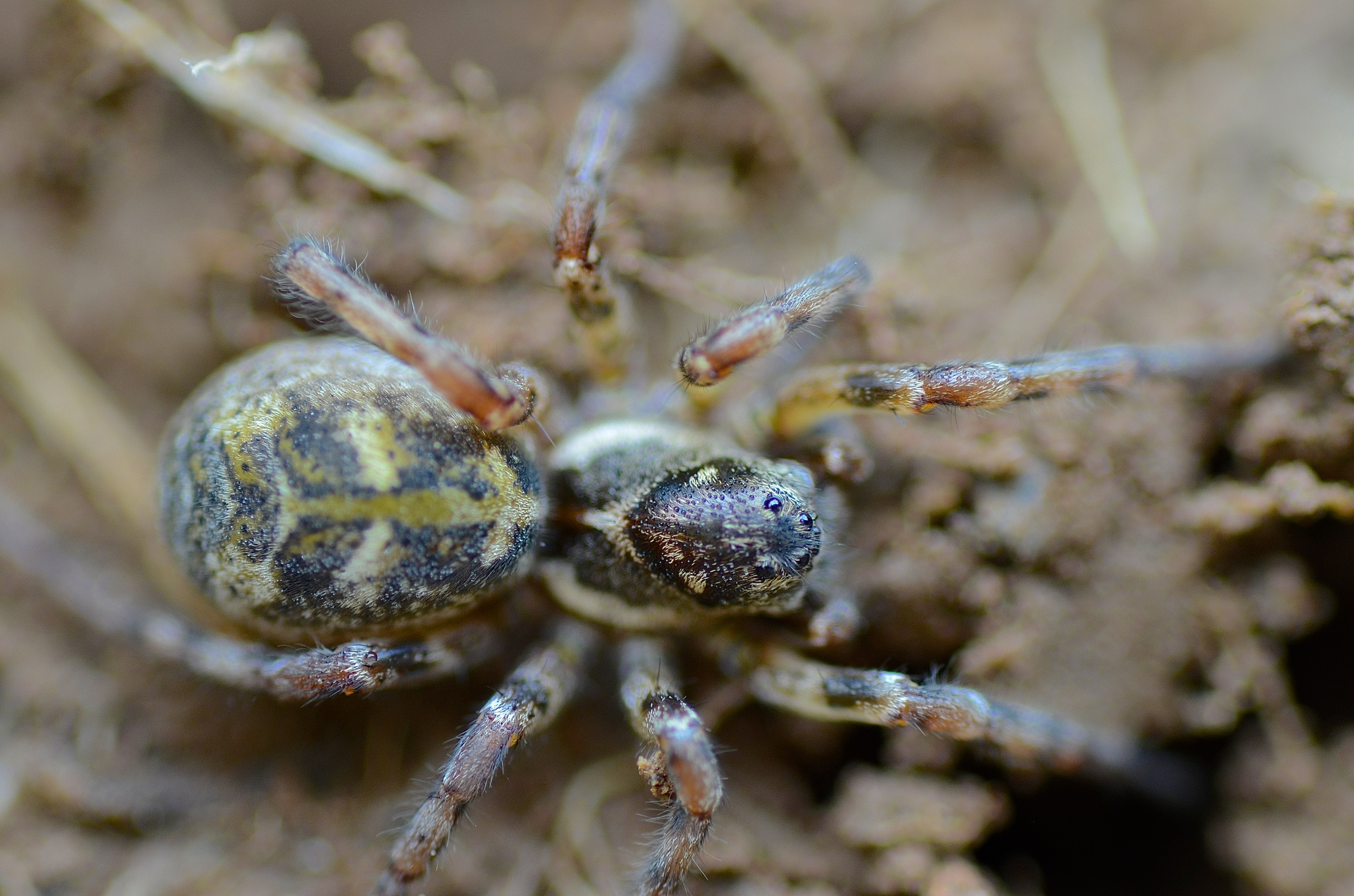
- Notocosa bellicosa found south of Oxford, New Zealand

Scientific classification
- Kingdom: Animalia
- Phylum: Arthropoda
- Subphylum: Chelicerata
- Class: Arachnida
- Order: Araneae
- Infraorder: Araneomorphae
- Family: Lycosidae
- Subfamily: Artoriinae
- Genus: Notocosa; Vink, 2002
- Species: N. bellicosa

Binomial name
- Notocosa bellicosa (Goyen, 1888)

Synonyms
- Lycosa bellicosa; Pardosa bellicosa

= Notocosa =

Genus of spiders

Notocosa is a genus of spiders in the family Lycosidae. It was first described in 2002 by Vink. As of 2017, it contains only one species, Notocosa bellicosa, found in New Zealand.

== Taxonomy ==
This species was first described as Lycosa bellicosa in 1888 by Peter Goyen. In 2002, it became the sole species of the Notocosa genus. The type specimen is considered lost.

== Description ==
The male is recorded at 8.9-9.6mm in length whereas the female is 9.5-11.5mm. When preserved, the carapace is coloured orange brown. The legs are orange brown with faint dark bands. The abdomen is coloured blackish with a creamy heart stripe. The female abdomen heart stripe has cream coloured patches around it.

== Distribution and habitat ==
This species occurs in the South Island of New Zealand south of 43°S. They inhabit grassland and open scrub habitats.

== Biology ==
Adults have been observed from September to May. Males are more commonly encountered as the females presumably don't leave the burrow as often. The females have been seen with juveniles in January and May.

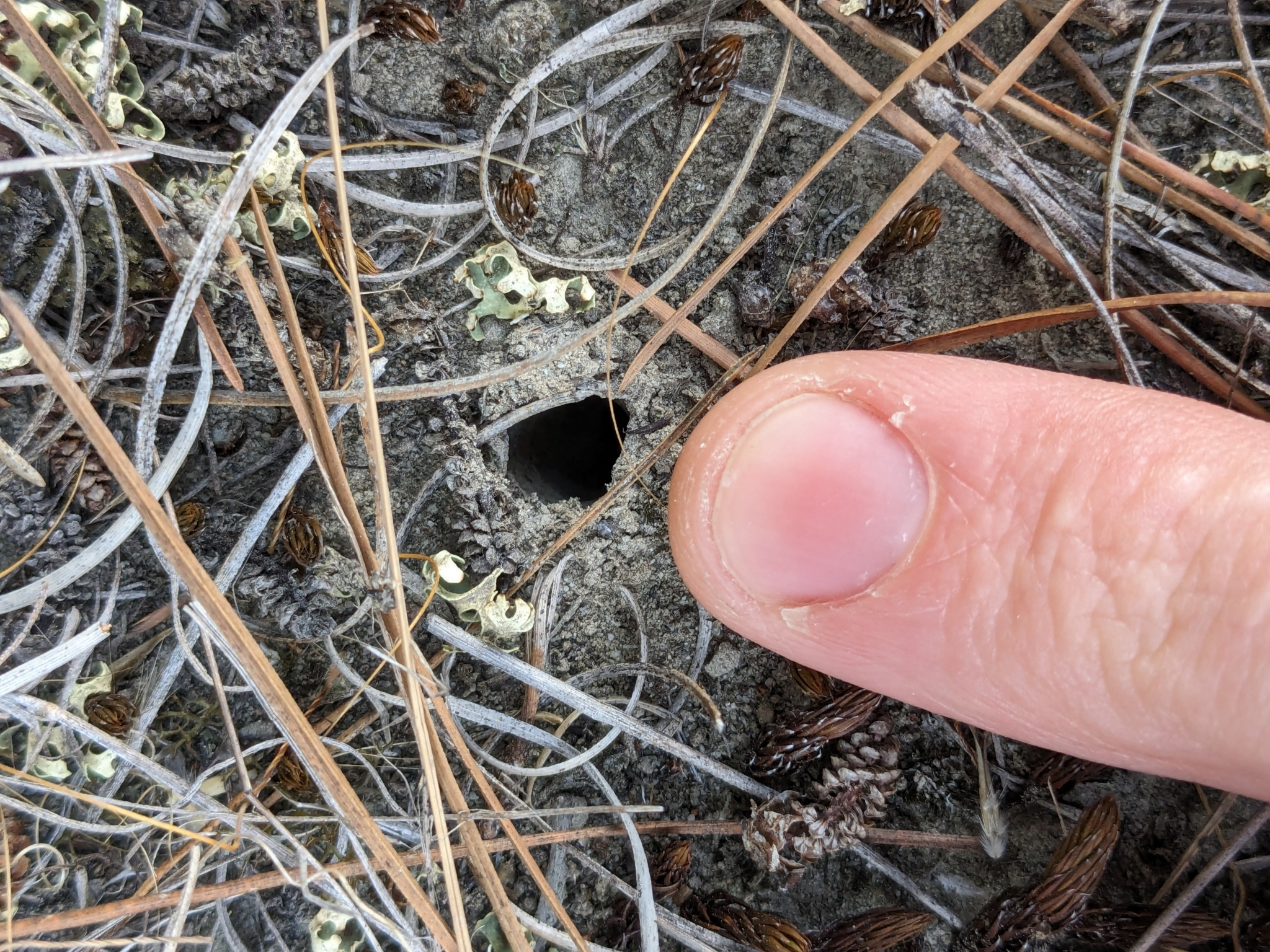
Notocosa bellicosa burrow

=== Burrow ===
This spider lives in vertical burrows in the ground 10cm deep. The opening to the burrow is lined with silk and contain debris. When prey passes by the burrow, the spider rushes out and drags it into the burrow to feed on. When the female produces eggs, she warms them by facing downwards in the burrow and raising the eggs on her spinnerets towards the sun.

== Conservation status ==
Under the New Zealand Threat Classification System, this species is listed as "Not Threatened".
