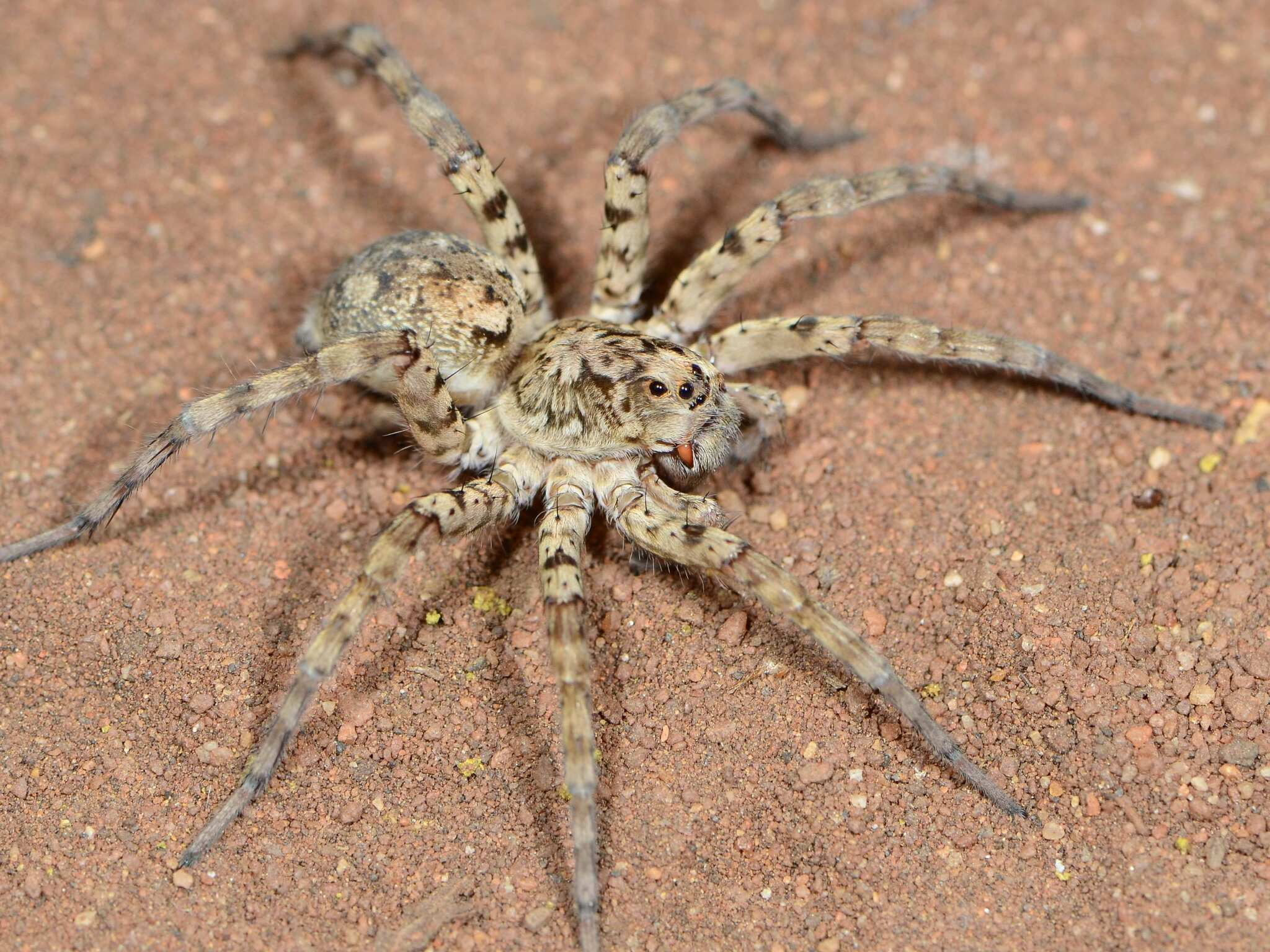
- female
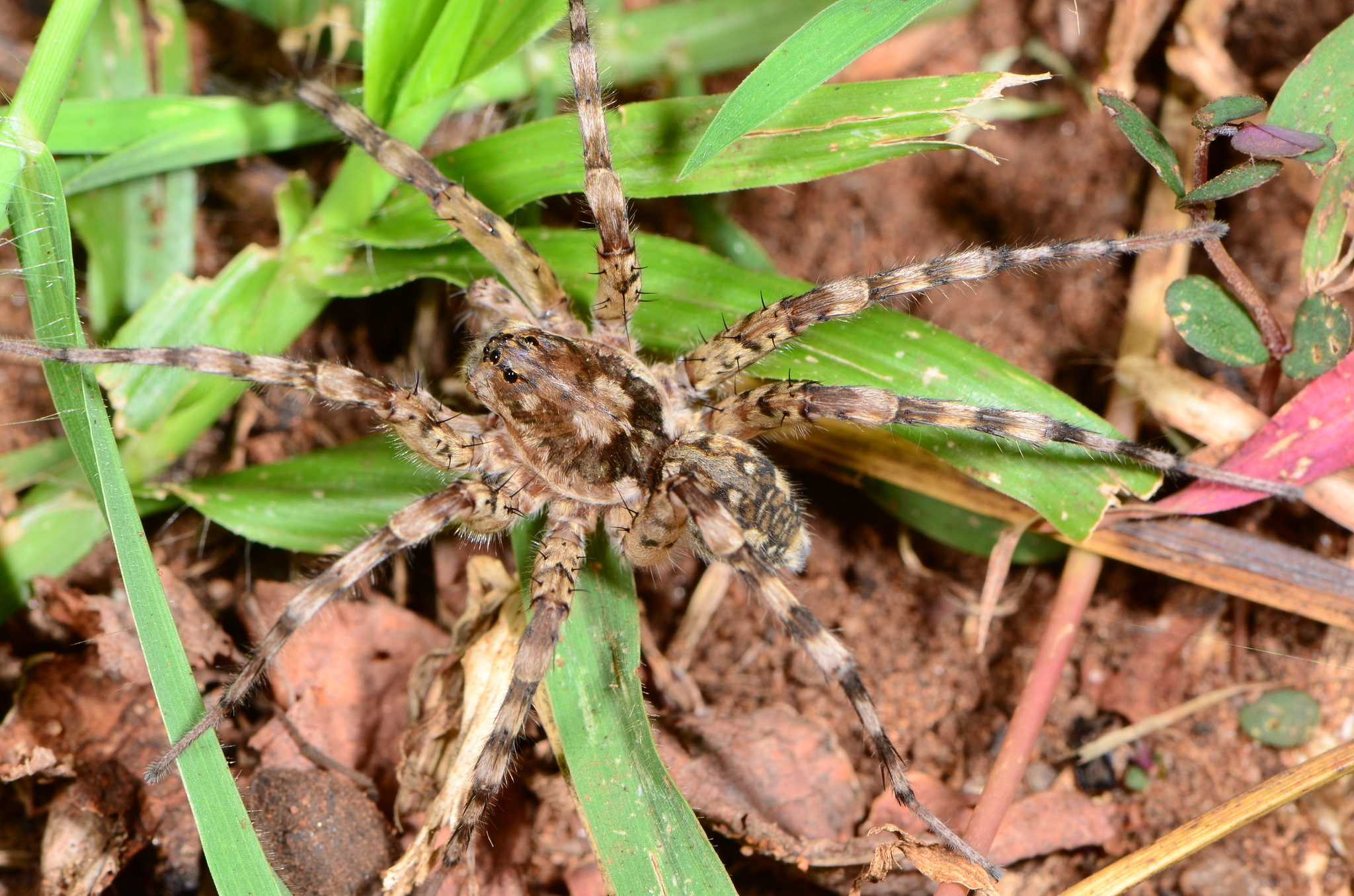
- female

Scientific classification
- Kingdom: Animalia
- Phylum: Arthropoda
- Subphylum: Chelicerata
- Class: Arachnida
- Order: Araneae
- Infraorder: Araneomorphae
- Family: Lycosidae
- Genus: Hippasosa
- Species: H. guttata

Binomial name
- Hippasosa guttata (Karsch, 1878)

Synonyms
- Lycosa guttata Karsch, 1878; Trochosa spissa Bösenberg & Lenz, 1895; Hippasa natalica Roewer, 1960

= Hippasosa guttata =

Species of spider

Hippasosa guttata is an African species of spider in the family Lycosidae.

== Distribution ==
Hippasosa guttata is found in Rwanda, Tanzania, Zambia, Namibia, Botswana, Mozambique, and South Africa. In South Africa, it is recorded from the provinces Gauteng, KwaZulu-Natal, Limpopo, and Mpumalanga.

== Habitat and ecology ==
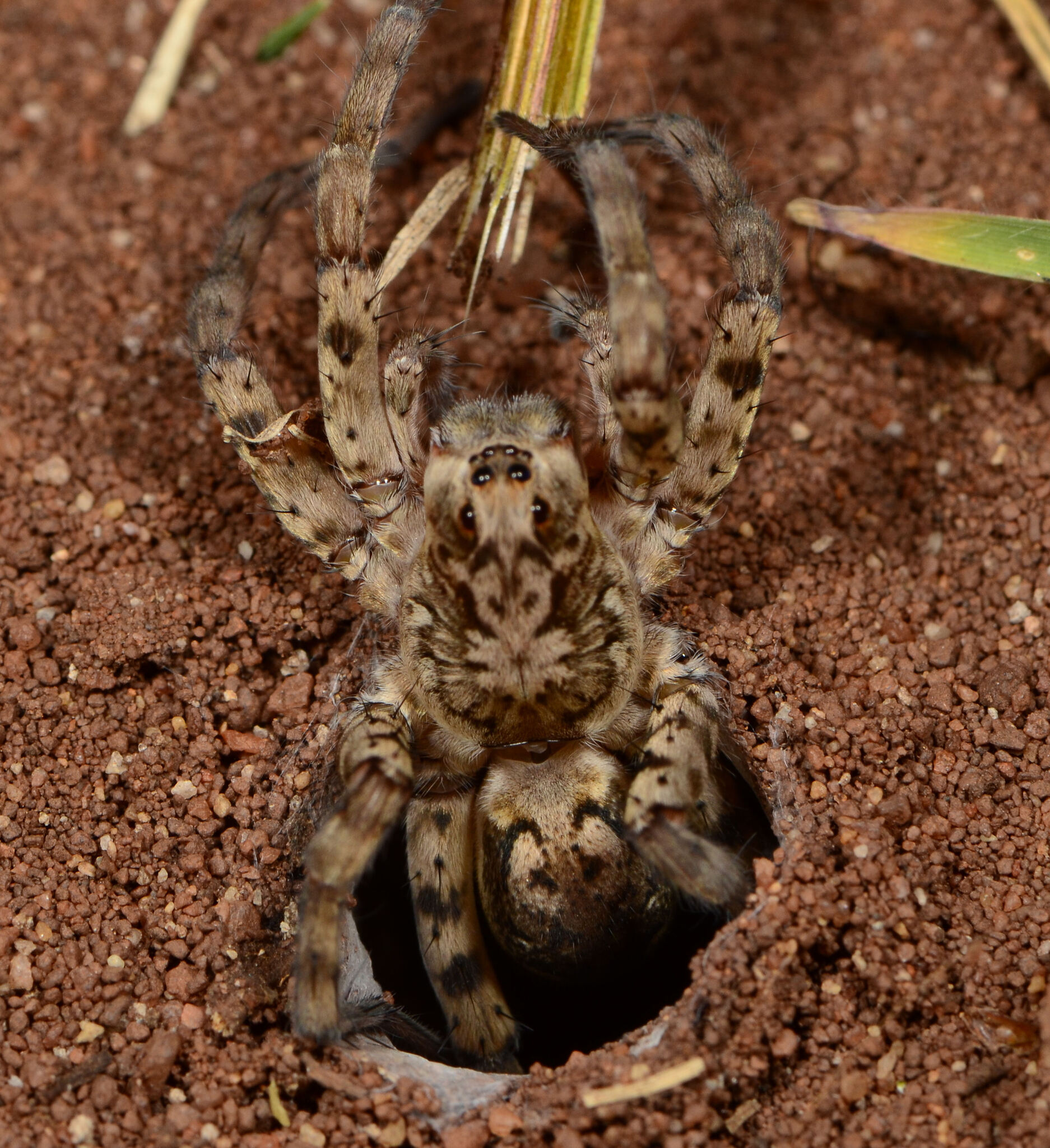
female in burrow

Hippasosa guttata inhabits the Grassland and Savanna biomes at altitudes ranging from 7 to 1411 m. These are free running ground spiders that hide in silk-lined burrows that are closed with a floppy soft silk lid. The species has also been sampled from tomato fields.

== Description ==
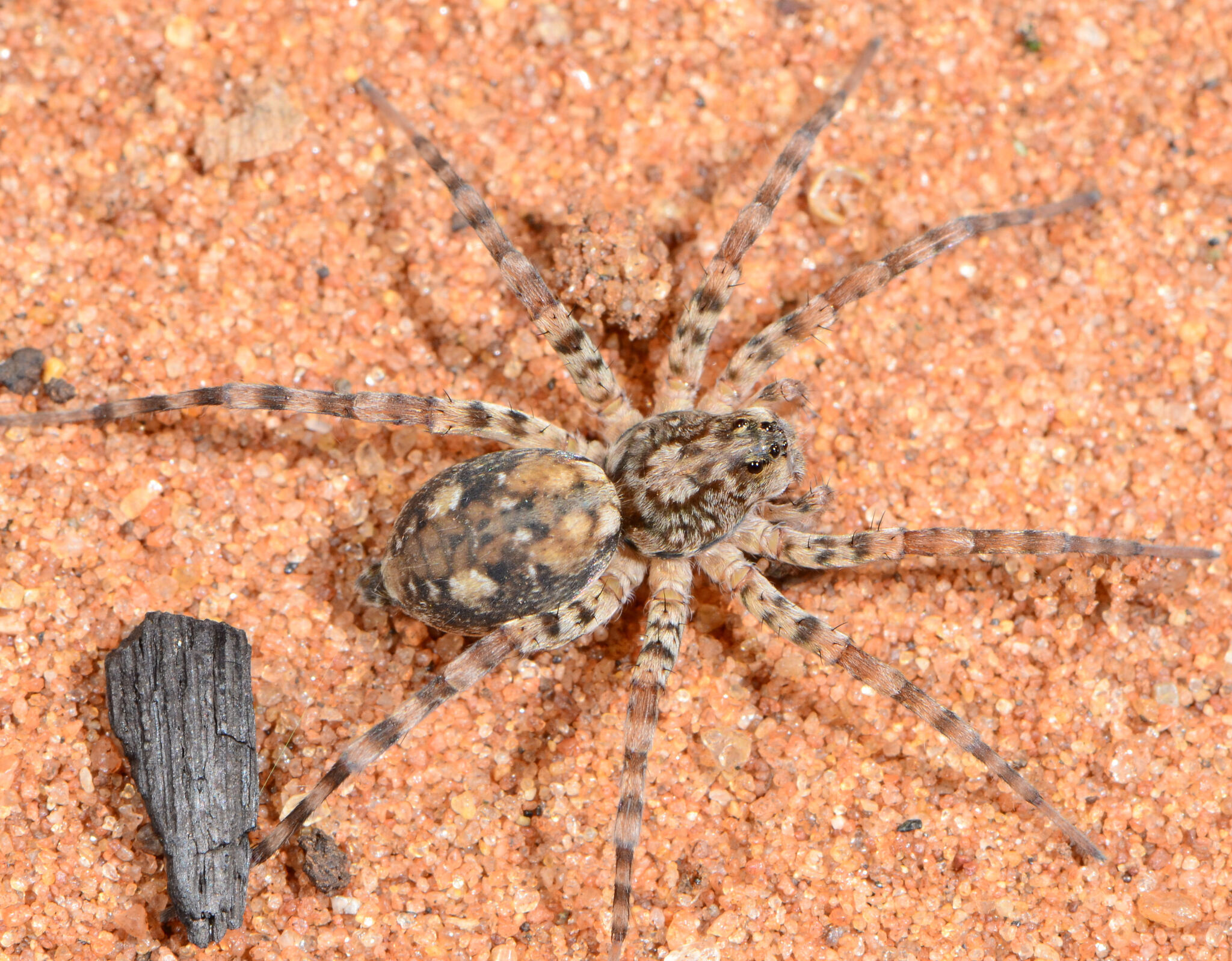
female

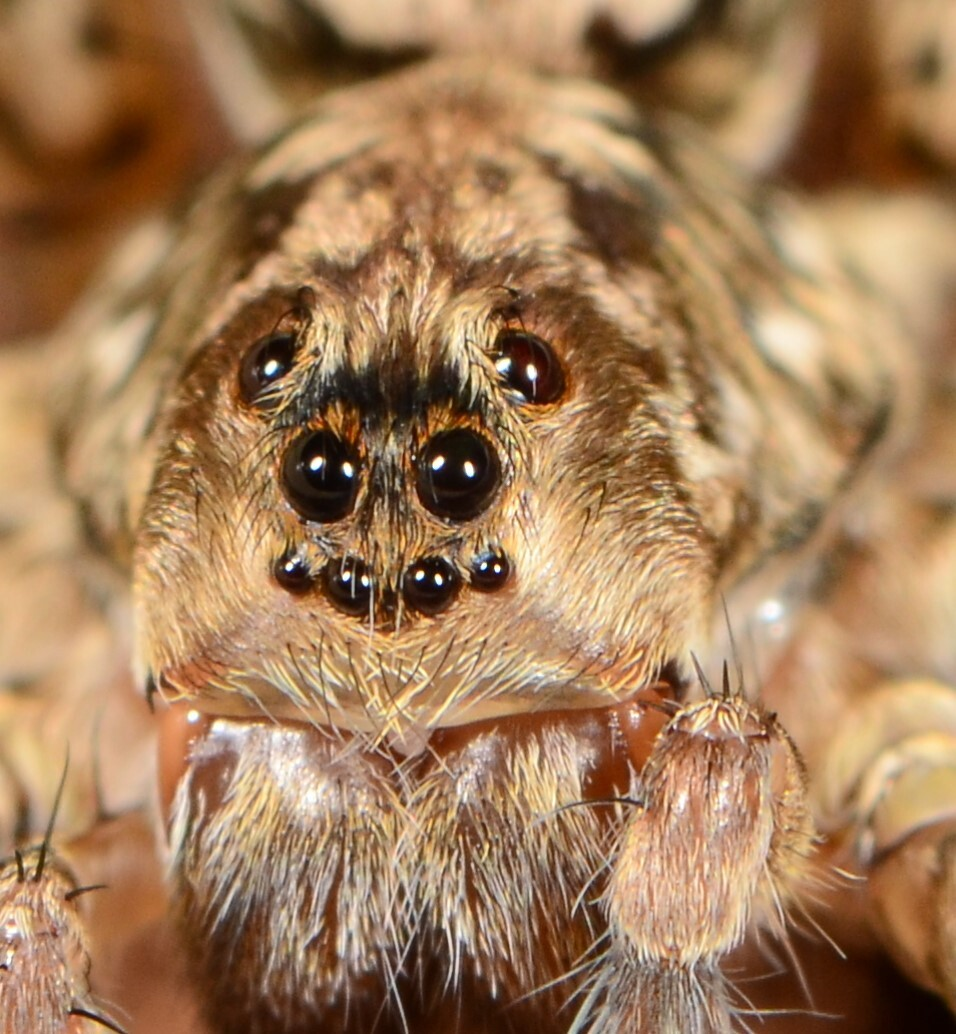
female

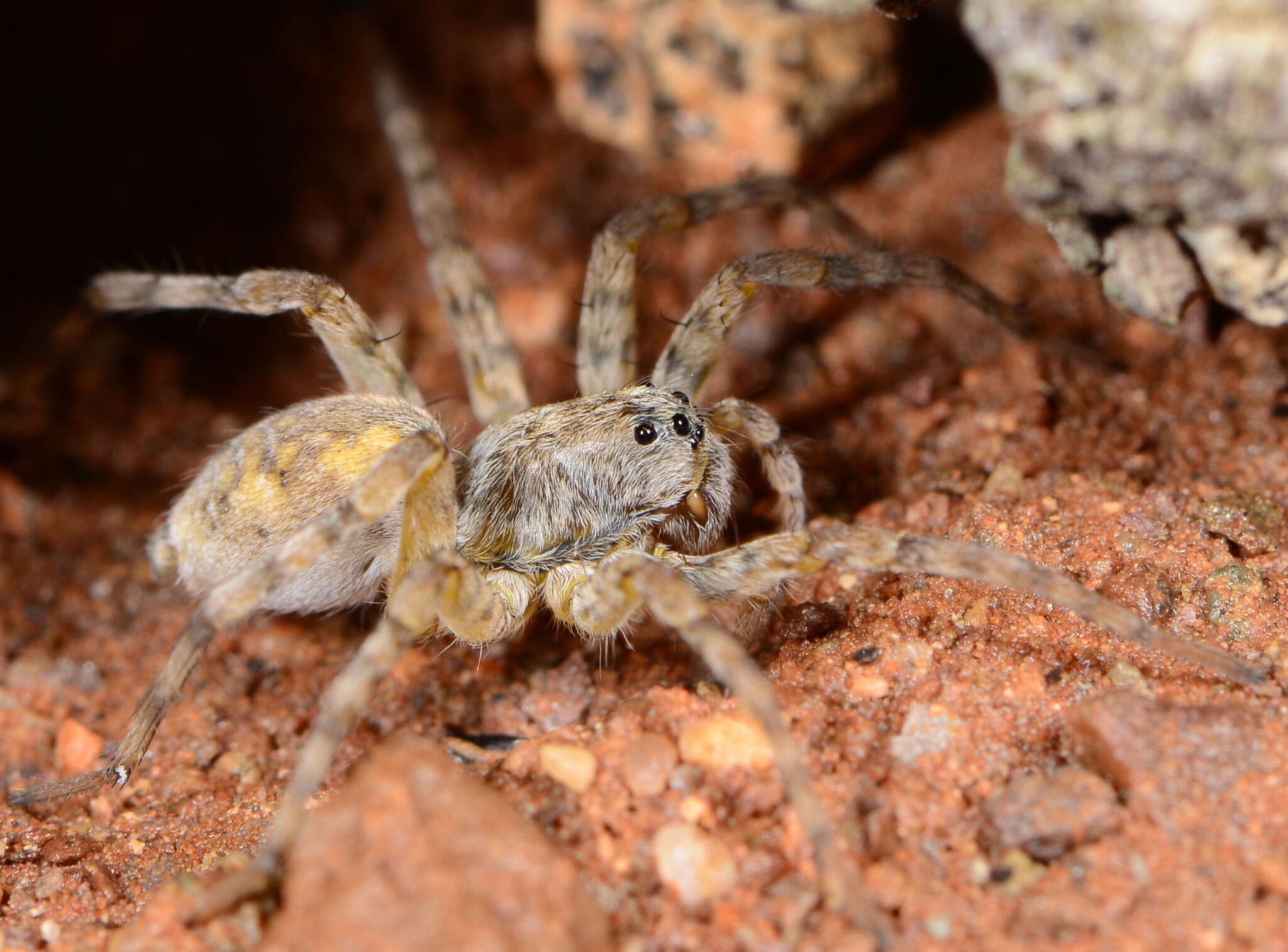
female

== Conservation ==
Hippasosa guttata is listed as Least Concern by the South African National Biodiversity Institute. There are no significant threats to the species and due to its wide geographical range, it is therefore listed as being of Least Concern. It is known from six protected areas.

== Taxonomy ==
Hippasosa guttata was originally described by Ferdinand Karsch in 1878 as Lycosa guttata from Mozambique. The species was revised by Alderweireldt in 1996 and is known from both sexes. In 2022, Sherwood transferred the species to the genus Hippasosa.
