= Navira =

Scientific classification
- Kingdom: Animalia
- Phylum: Arthropoda
- Subphylum: Chelicerata
- Class: Arachnida
- Order: Araneae
- Infraorder: Araneomorphae
- Family: Lycosidae
- Subfamily: Artoriinae
- Genus: Navira; Piacentini & Grismado, 2009
- Species: N. naguan

Binomial name
- Navira naguan Piacentini & Grismado, 2009

Genus of spiders

Navira is a genus of spiders in the family Lycosidae. It was first described in 2009 by Piacentini & Grismado. As of 2017, it contains only one species, Navira naguan, found in Argentina.
