= Diahogna =

Scientific classification
- Kingdom: Animalia
- Phylum: Arthropoda
- Subphylum: Chelicerata
- Class: Arachnida
- Order: Araneae
- Infraorder: Araneomorphae
- Family: Lycosidae
- Subfamily: Artoriinae
- Genus: Diahogna; Roewer

Species
- Diahogna exculta (L. Koch, 1876); Diahogna hildegardae Framenau, 2006; Diahogna martensi (Karsch, 1878); Diahogna pisauroides Framenau, 2006

Genus of spiders

Diahogna is a genus of spiders in the family Lycosidae. It was first described in 1960 by Roewer. As of 2017, it contains 4 Australian species.
