= Syroloma =

Scientific classification
- Kingdom: Animalia
- Phylum: Arthropoda
- Subphylum: Chelicerata
- Class: Arachnida
- Order: Araneae
- Infraorder: Araneomorphae
- Family: Lycosidae
- Subfamily: Artoriinae
- Genus: Syroloma; Simon

Species
- Syroloma major Simon, 1900; Syroloma minor Simon, 1900

Genus of spiders

Syroloma is a genus of spiders in the family Lycosidae. It was first described in 1900 by Simon. As of 2017, it contains two species from Hawaii.
