= Artoria segrega =

Conservation status
- Naturally Uncommon (NZ TCS)

Scientific classification
- Kingdom: Animalia
- Phylum: Arthropoda
- Subphylum: Chelicerata
- Class: Arachnida
- Order: Araneae
- Infraorder: Araneomorphae
- Family: Lycosidae
- Genus: Artoria
- Species: A. segrega

Binomial name
- Artoria segrega Vink, 2002

Species of spider

Artoria segrega is a species of Lycosidae spider that is endemic to New Zealand.

== Taxonomy ==
This species was described in 2002 by Cor Vink from male and female specimens. The species name is derived from "segregus", which is Latin for segregated. This is in reference to its separation from other species of Artoria, which are mostly found in Australia. The holotype is stored in the New Zealand Arthropod Collection under registration number NZAC03014985.

== Description ==
The male is recorded at 4.3mm in length whereas the female is 4.4-5.3mm. The carapace is coloured orangish brown, has blackish lines originating from the fovea, is blackish along the margins and around the eyes. The legs are orange brown with faint black banding. The abdomen is yellow brown with brownish blotches. It is best distinguished from other Artoria species by minor differences in the structure of the male and female genitalia.

== Distribution and habitat ==
This species is only known from Poor Nights Islands in New Zealand. It apparently occurs in leaf litter. Adults are known to occur from September to December.

== Conservation status ==
Under the New Zealand Threat Classification System, this species is listed as "Naturally Uncommon" with the qualifiers of "Island Endemic" and "One Location".
