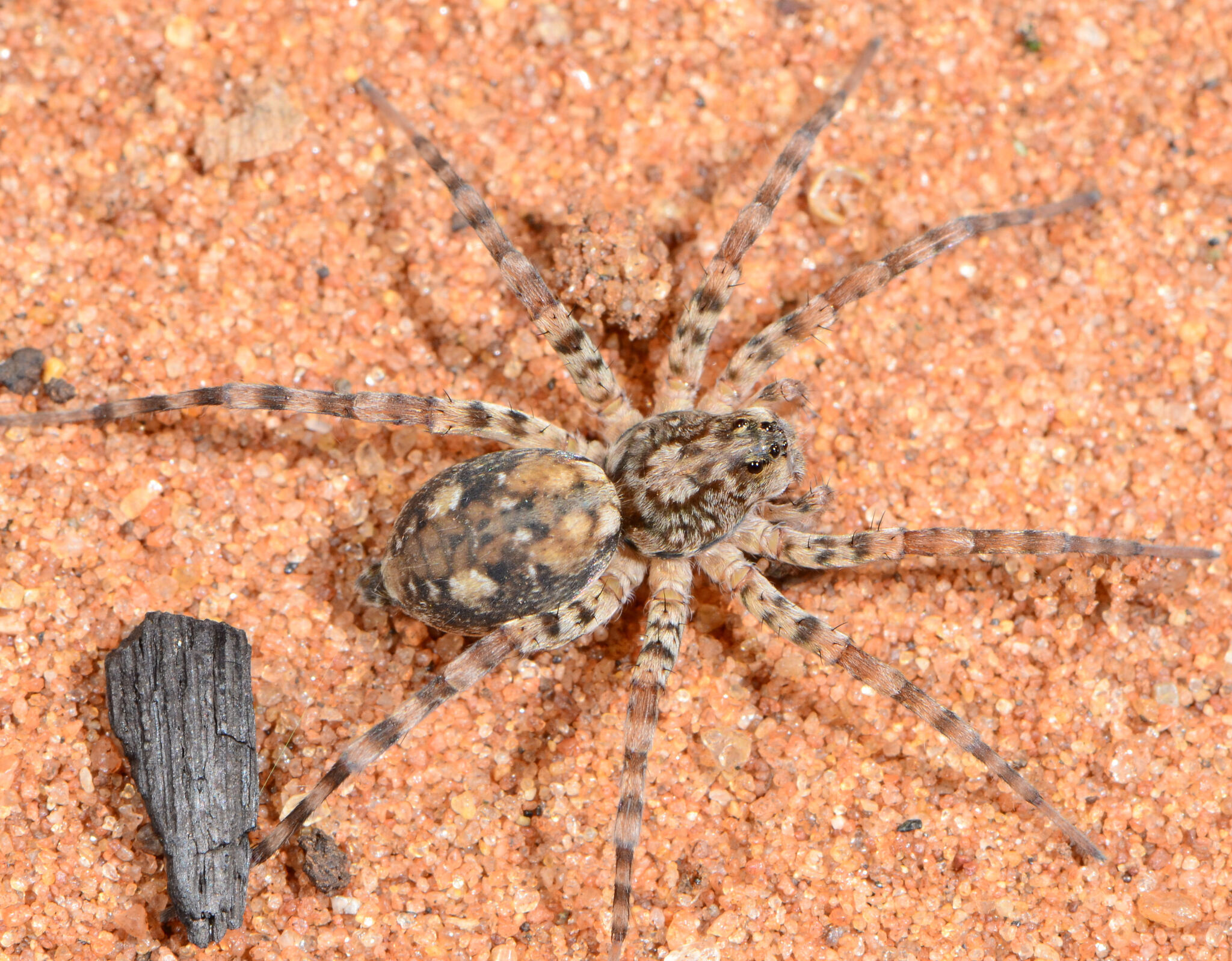
- female H. guttata
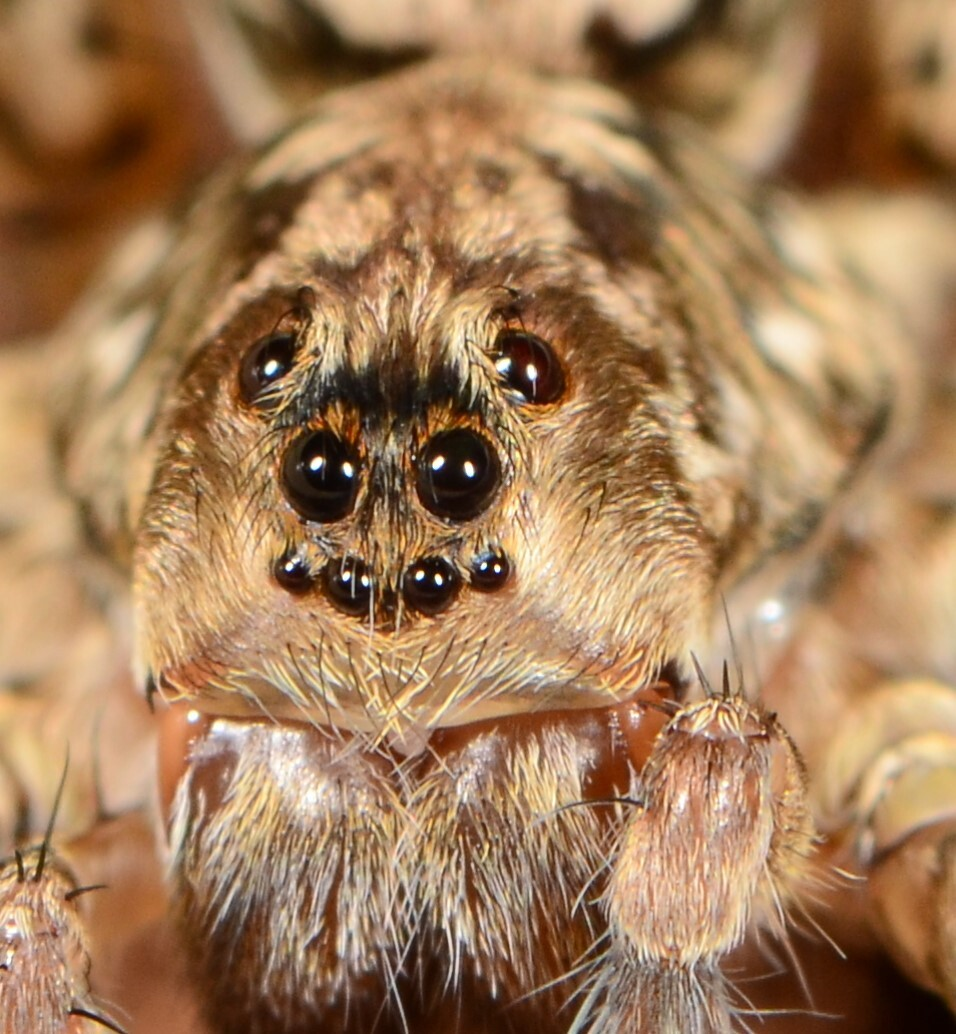
- female H. guttata

Scientific classification
- Kingdom: Animalia
- Phylum: Arthropoda
- Subphylum: Chelicerata
- Class: Arachnida
- Order: Araneae
- Infraorder: Araneomorphae
- Family: Lycosidae
- Genus: Hippasosa; Roewer, 1960

= Hippasosa =

Genus of spiders

Hippasosa is a genus of wolf spiders in the family Lycosidae. Its species are found in Africa and Asia.

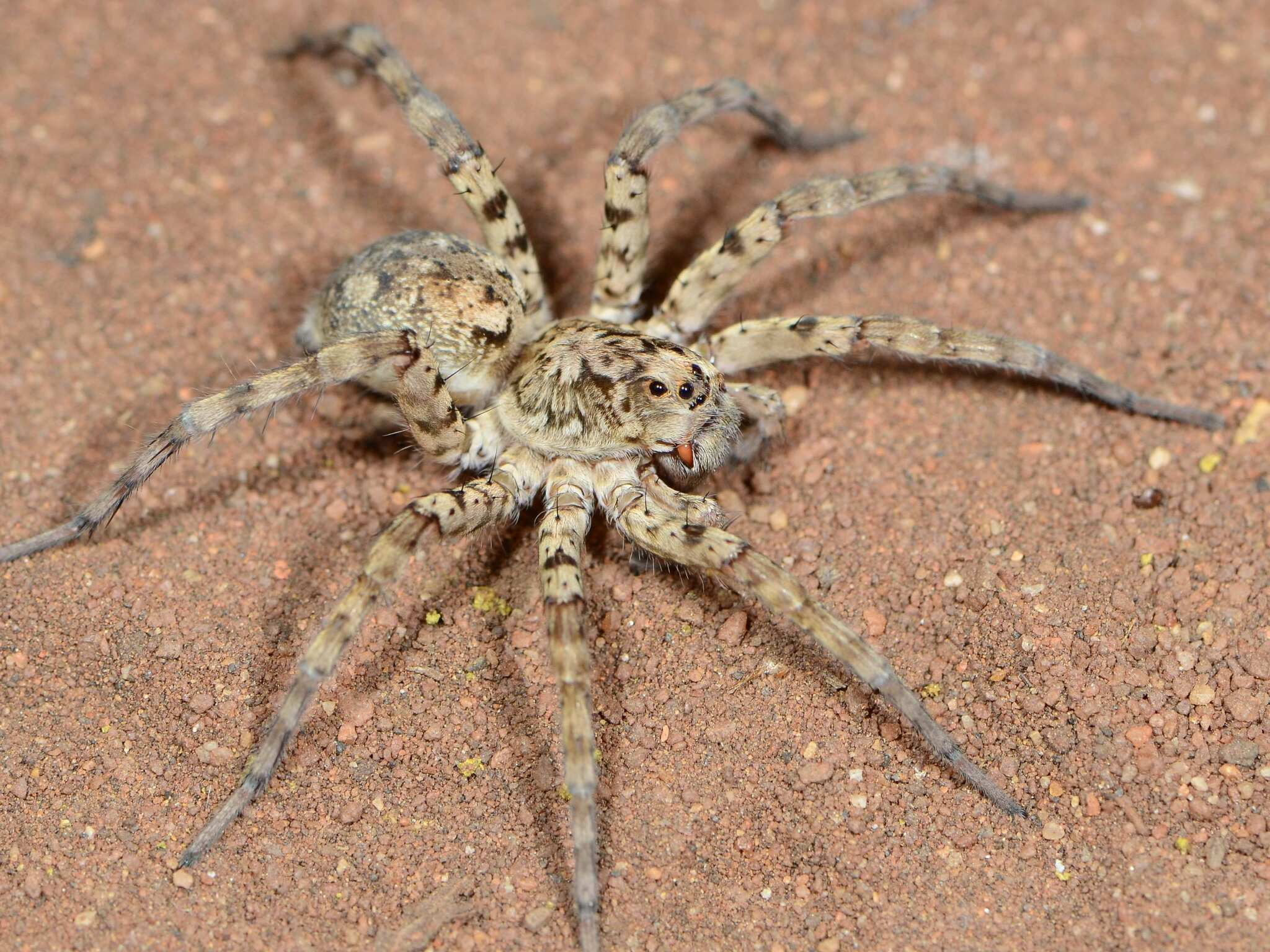
female H. guttata

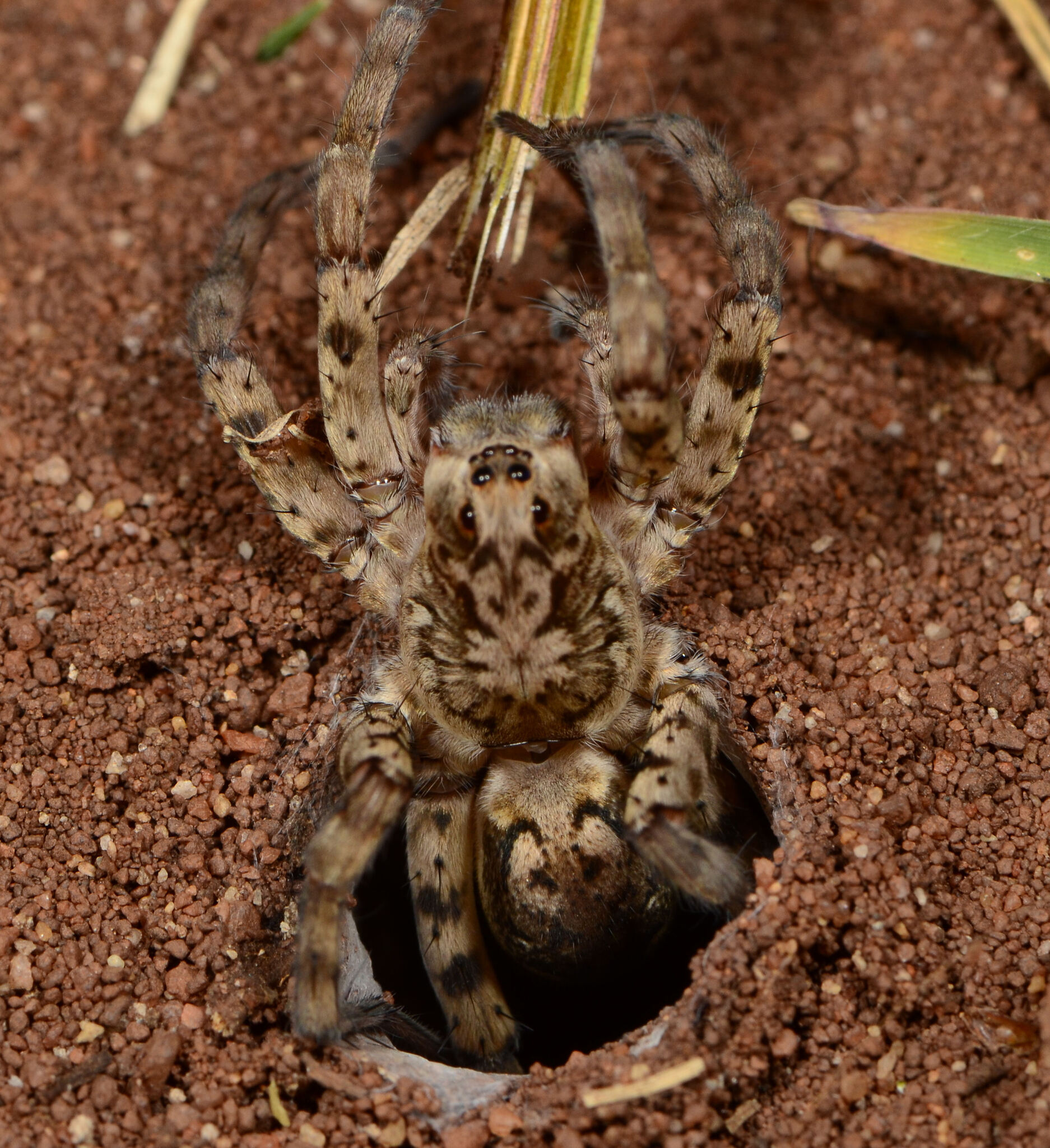
female H. guttata in burrow

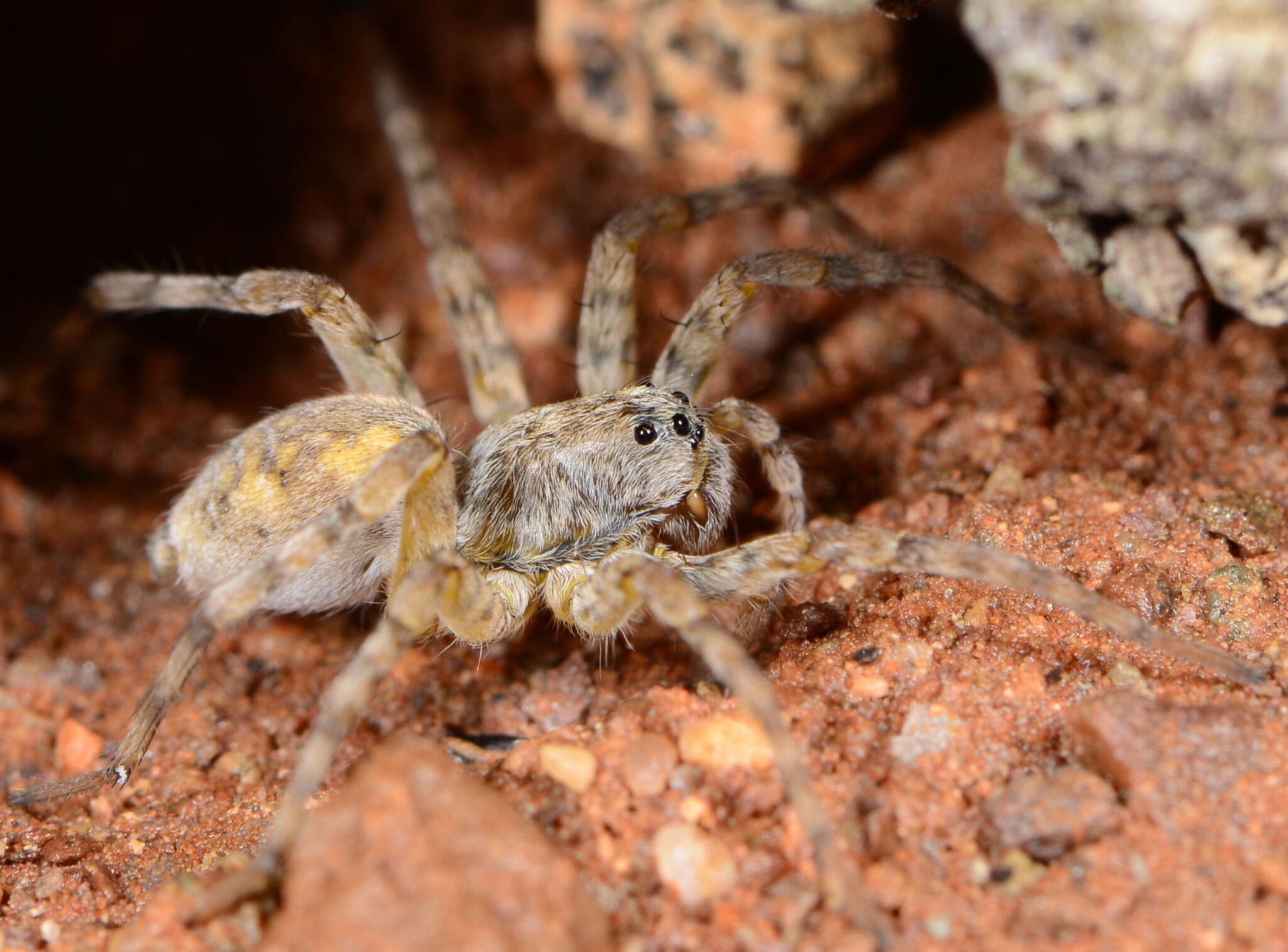
female H. guttata

== Taxonomy ==
These species were transferred from genus Ocyale, which is now considered a nomen dubium.

== Species ==
As of October 2025, this genus includes thirteen species:

- Hippasosa dewinterae (Alderweireldt, 1996) – Malawi, Namibia, South Africa
- Hippasosa discrepans (Roewer, 1960) – Ethiopia
- Hippasosa fera (Strand, 1908) – Madagascar
- Hippasosa ghost (Jocque & Jocqué, 2017) – Madagascar
- Hippasosa grandis (Alderweireldt, 1996) – Togo, Gabun, DR Congo, Namibia
- Hippasosa guttata (Karsch, 1878) – Rwanda, Tanzania, Zambia, Namibia, Botswana, Mozambique, South Africa
- Hippasosa kumari (Dyal, 1935) – Pakistan
- Hippasosa lanca (Karsch, 1879) – Sri Lanka
- Hippasosa pelliona (Audouin, 1826) – Algeria, Egypt
- Hippasosa pilosa Roewer, 1960 – Turkey, Africa to Saudi Arabia, India, Sri Lanka, Myanmar (type species)
- Hippasosa qiongzhongensis (Yin & Peng, 1997) – China (Hainan)
- Hippasosa thailandica Wang, Irfan & Zhang, 2025 – Thailand
- Hippasosa yunnanensis Wang, Irfan & Zhang, 2025 – China
