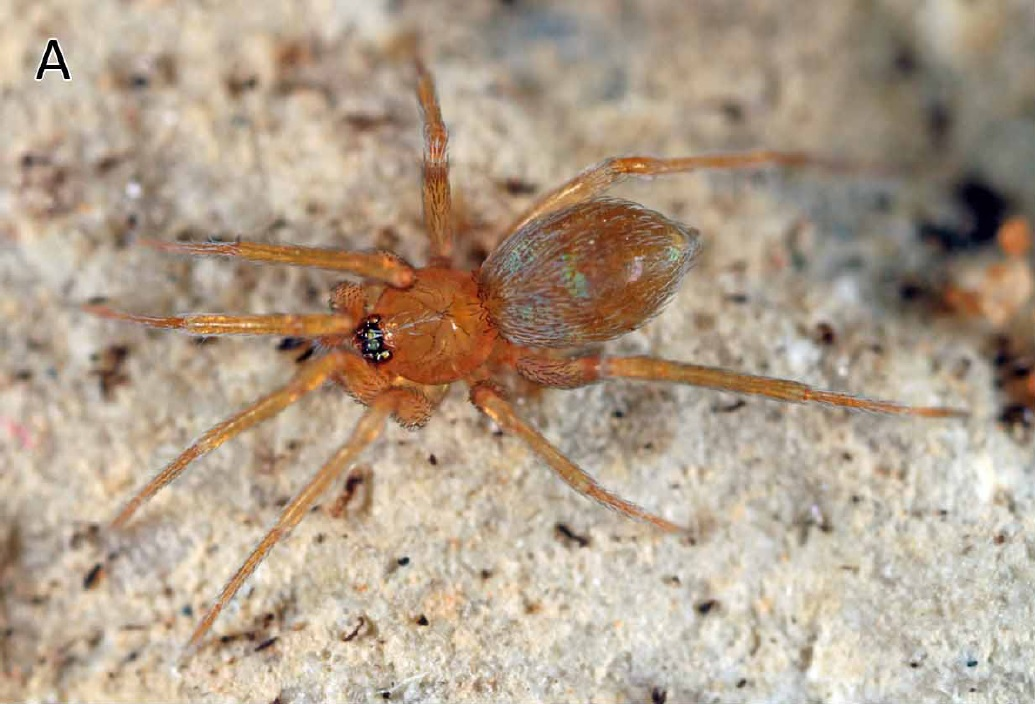
- Male
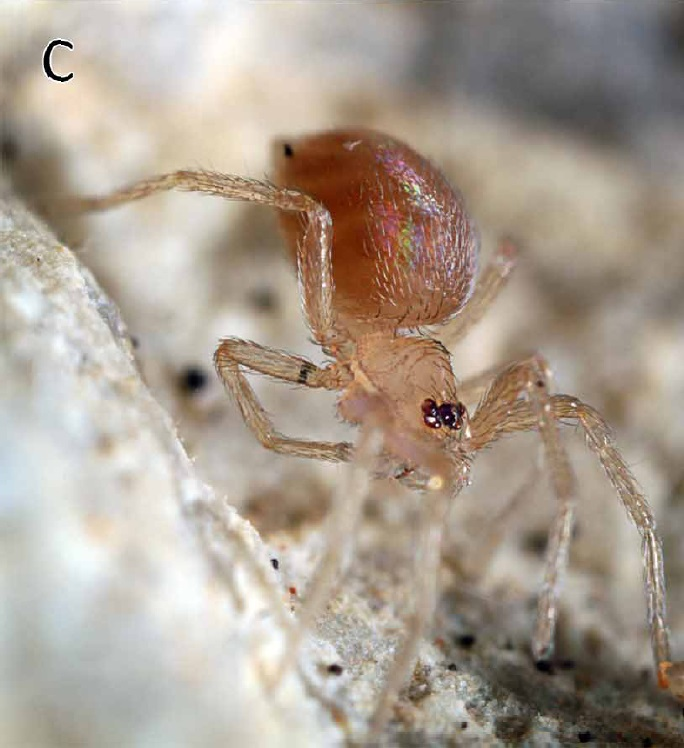
- Female

Scientific classification
- Kingdom: Animalia
- Phylum: Arthropoda
- Subphylum: Chelicerata
- Class: Arachnida
- Order: Araneae
- Infraorder: Araneomorphae
- Family: Oonopidae
- Genus: Tapinesthis
- Species: T. inermis

Binomial name
- Tapinesthis inermis (Simon, 1882)

= Tapinesthis =

Genus of spiders

Tapinesthis is a monotypic genus of spiders in the family Oonopidae, commonly known as goblin spiders. Its only species is Tapinesthis inermis, the ivy parchment spider. Originally native to Europe, it has been introduced to North America. The spider inhabits a variety of habitats, including forests, dry grasslands, garrigue, and, as a synanthropic species, human dwellings. Previously, it was thought to exhibit two seasonal forms, but research since 2014 has cast doubt on this hypothesis.

== Description ==
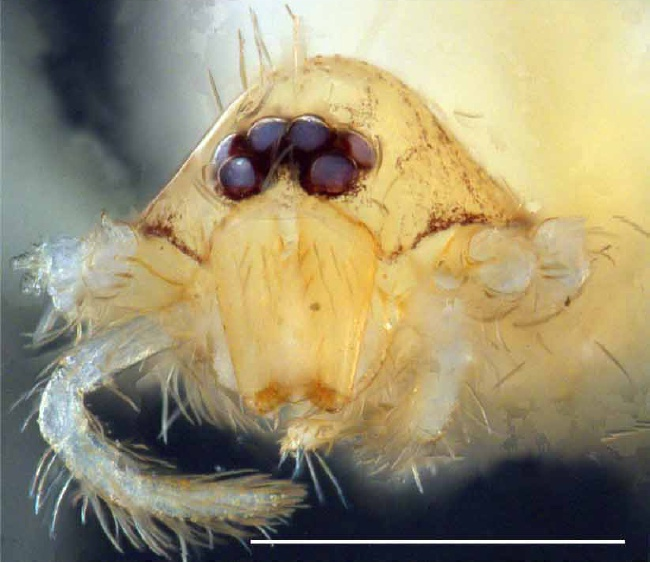
Frontal view of a preserved female, showing the distinctive steeply sloping carapace and visible eyes and chelicerae.

The female reaches a body length of 2.4–2.5 mm (0.094–0.098 in), with the prosoma (cephalothorax) measuring 0.8 mm (0.031 in). The male is slightly smaller, with a body length of 1.8 mm (0.071 in) and a prosoma of 0.75 mm (0.030 in).

This species is a pale representative of the goblin spiders with a soft body structure. Its most striking feature is the steeply sloping carapace (the dorsal shield of the prosoma), which bears a dark net-like pattern. The legs lack spines entirely, and the claws of the tarsi (foot segments) are single-structured. The petiolus (the stalk connecting the prosoma and opisthosoma) has a net-like structure.

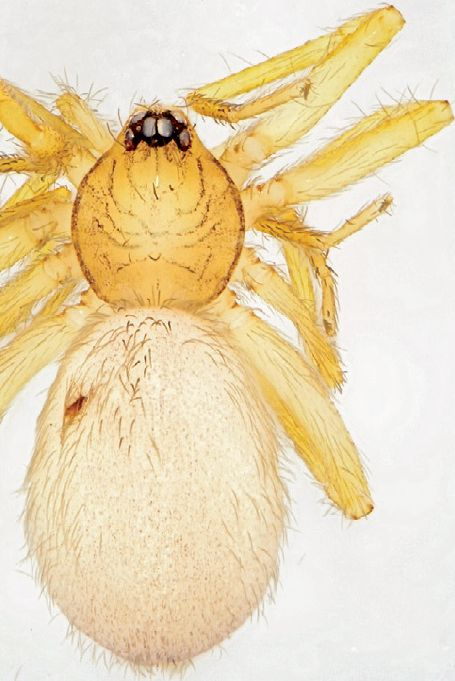
Dorsal view of a preserved female.

In living specimens, the carapace is pale yellowish-orange to pink. When preserved in ethanol, it turns yellowish-white to pale orange. Regardless of condition, the carapace displays a dark net-like pattern and a pale border. Non-marginal needle-like setae (chitinized hairs) in the pars cephalica (head region) are arranged in three rows, appearing egg-shaped when viewed dorsally. Laterally, the pars cephalica slopes sharply, being highest at the coxae (hip segments). Anteriorly, it narrows to 0.49 times its maximum width or less, with rounded posterolateral corners. The surface of the elevated pars cephalica and its sides are smooth, with radiating platelet-like patches. The carapace lacks a fovea (apodemal pit) and thoracic depressions. Its lateral margin is wavy and smooth, and the clypeus (the area between the anterior eyes and carapace edge) curves downward and tilts forward laterally. Like other goblin spiders, the ivy parchment spider has six eyes arranged in two rows (four in the upper row, two in the lower), all well-developed but unequal in size. The lower oval eyes are positioned at least their own radius from the carapace edge and spaced from each other by their radius to diameter. The upper eyes are round, with the upper row appearing recurved when viewed from above or frontally. The distance between the upper lateral and lower eyes is slightly less than the radius of the lower eyes. The upper median eyes touch, and the distance between the upper median and lateral eyes, as well as between the upper median and lower eyes, is less than the radius of the upper median eyes.

The chelicerae (jaw claws) are straight and toothless, with claws positioned medially. The inner margins of the basal segments bear sparse bristle-like setae. The labium (sclerotized plate between the maxillae at the front of the sternum) is rectangular and fused to the sternum (breastplate of the prosoma). Its anterior edge is notched medially, with small circular ornaments at the basal corners. The labium is sclerotized, like the sternum, and has six or more bristles at its anterior edge. The subdistal part of the labium has unmodified bristle-like setae. The maxillae (modified coxae of the pedipalps) are not free distally and feature a single row of serrula (toothed edge). The posteromedian and anteromedian parts of the maxillae are unmodified and sclerotized. The anterior edge of the maxillae has two rows of bristle-like setae: one ventral row of spatula-shaped setae and one dorsal row of distally pectinate setae. A third row of fine spiky bristle-like setae runs along the medial edge of the maxillae. The chelicerae, labium, and maxillae are yellowish-white. The sternum is yellowish-white with faint radiating dark stripes, longer than wide, with smooth radial grooves between the coxae. Its anterior edge has a semicircular depression in the medial half, while the posterior edge extends over the anterior corners of the fourth leg pair’s coxae as a single extension. The coxae are spaced approximately equally, and the sternum bears several evenly scattered setae but lacks hair tufts.

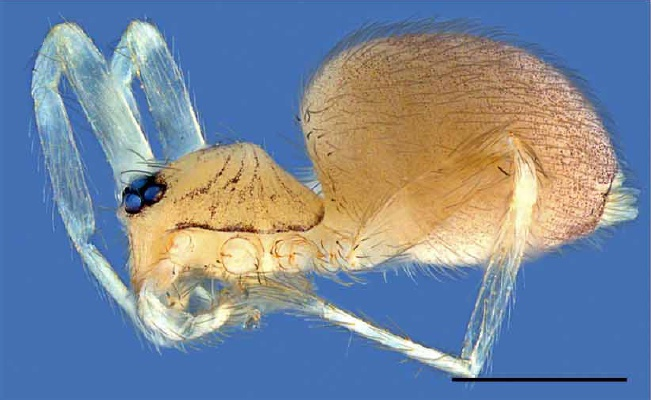
Lateral view of a preserved female.

The legs are white and lack patterns. Unlike some goblin spiders, the femora of the fourth leg pair are not thickened and match the size of other leg pairs’ femora. The patellae (segments between femora and tibiae) of all legs and the tibiae of the first leg pair are longer than the carapace. The tibiae of the first leg pair lack modifications. The metatarsi (tarsal segments) of the second leg pair medially and the fourth leg pair basally each have an eye-shaped, smooth glandular opening with a simple pore. The tarsal claws are arranged in a single, comb-like row, with smooth inner surfaces on both pro- and retroclaws. The upper claws of all tarsi have six teeth on the lateral surface of both pro- and retroclaws. The claw tufts consist of three covered setae. The tarsi lack the reduced claws found in other spiders. The trichobothria (sensory setae) have rounded bothria (attachment organs). Unlike other spiders, the inner structure of the trichobothrial openings is not lattice-like. The trichobothrial hoods are covered with numerous low, closely spaced, rib-like structures and may include an eye-shaped structure of unknown function. The tarsal organs (sensory organs) are pear-shaped, with edges extending beyond surrounding structures. They have four receptors on the anterior two leg pairs and three on the posterior two, though variations in number and arrangement exist. The receptor arrangement formula, typical for goblin spiders, is likely 3-3-2-2 (per leg pair), as the most distal receptors on each leg are bifurcated but arise from a single base, similar to the genus Stenoonops.

The opisthosoma (abdomen) is egg-shaped with a rounded posterior. Unlike some goblin spiders, it lacks a scutum (sclerotized dorsal plate). The yellowish-brown dorsal surface is soft and patternless, bearing needle-like setae. Additional needle-like setae, more uniform, are found in the epigastric (near the stomach) and less uniform in the postepigastric regions. The petiolus has a net-like structure, similar to the genus Orchestina. The opisthosoma expands anteriorly from the petiolus. A colulus (a vestigial structure, likely a remnant of the cribellum) with four bristle-like setae is present, as in all ecribellate spiders. The six spinnerets are arranged in three pairs, typical for spiders.

=== Seasonal forms hypothesis ===
The ivy parchment spider is the only known spider species described as having two seasonal forms, with distinct coloration and setation depending on whether it is a spring or summer form. This phenomenon was first described by Raymond de Dalmas in 1916. The spring form is characterized by stronger coloration and a cuticle with minimal setae, while the summer form is lighter with a more setose opisthosoma.

In 2014, Arnaud Henrard, Rudy Jocqué, and Barbara C. Baehr reexamined this hypothesis and suggested that the described forms likely resulted from Dalmas examining individuals of different ages. As the spiders age, they darken, possibly due to pigment uptake from prey, and their setation decreases. Dalmas’ studies, conducted in the Mediterranean, may have involved darker specimens that hatched in autumn and survived winter, a plausible scenario in that region. Henrard and colleagues supported their hypothesis by analyzing a pale female in spring and an orange male in August of the same year, noting that the seasonal forms appear independent of sex.

=== Sexual dimorphism ===
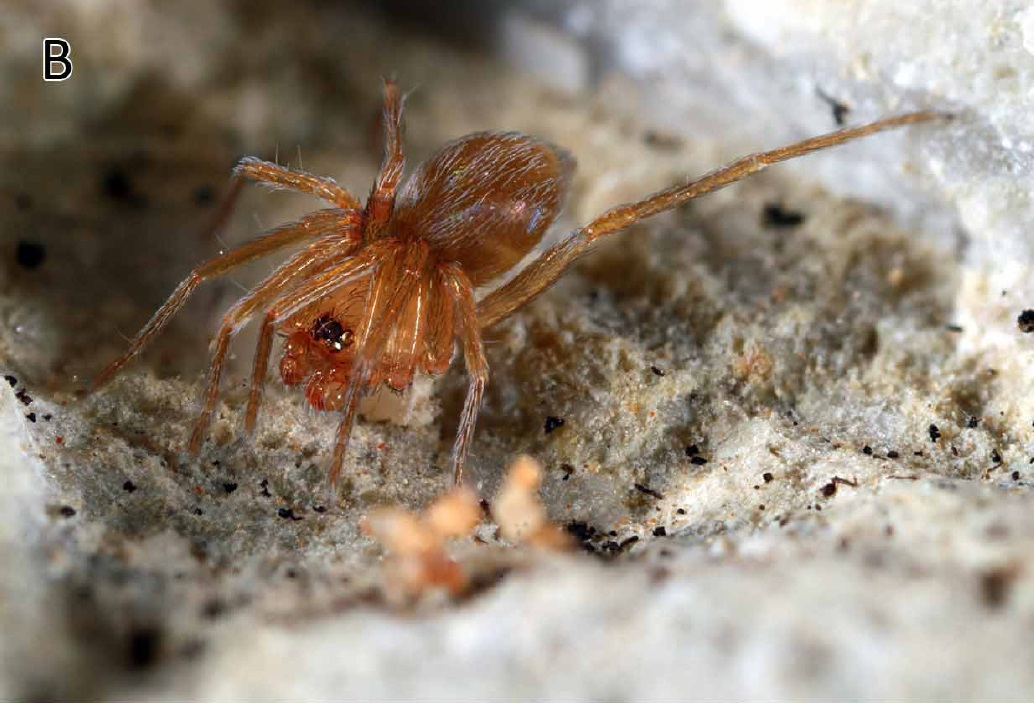
Male specimen.

Like many spiders, the ivy parchment spider exhibits sexual dimorphism, though it is weakly pronounced. Apart from size differences, it is primarily evident in the structure of the spinnerets.

In males, the anterolateral spinnerets each bear one major ampullaceous gland arising from a cylindrical tubercle and two piriform glands from flat tubercles. The posteromedian spinnerets have a minor ampullaceous gland, also from a cylindrical tubercle, and the posterolateral spinnerets each have a single aciniform gland.

Views of preserved male specimens

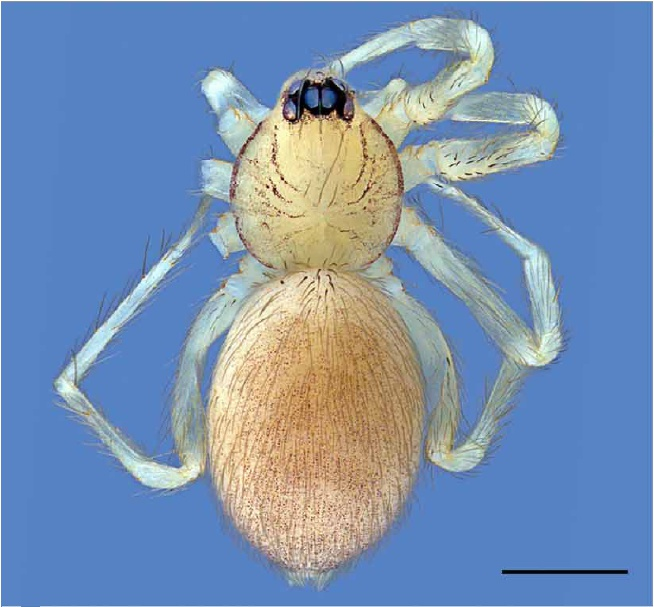
Dorsal view of a preserved male

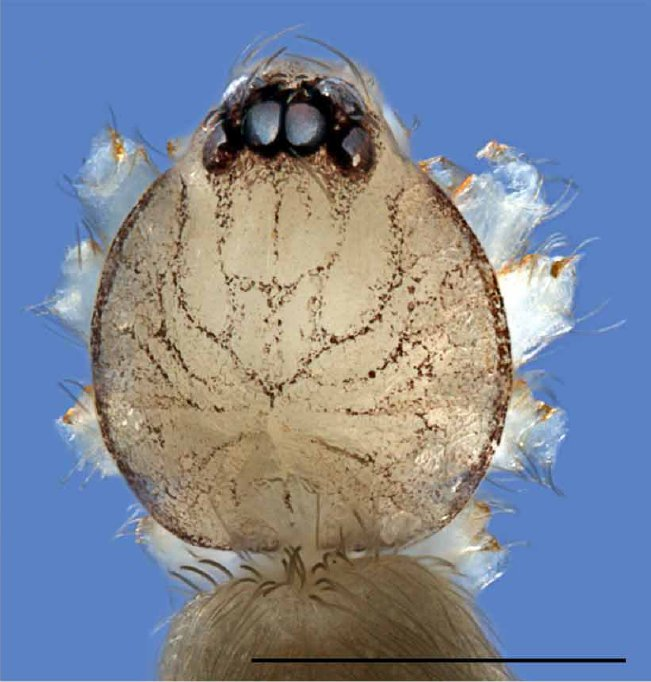
Dorsal detailed view of a male's prosoma

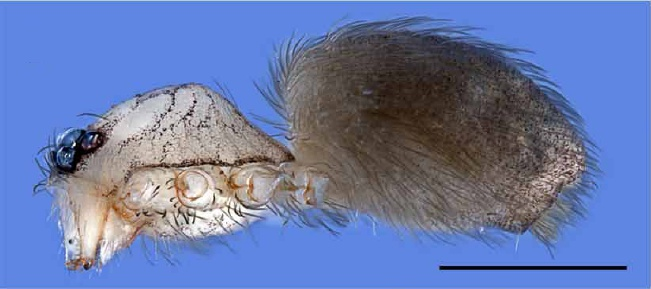
Lateral view of a preserved male

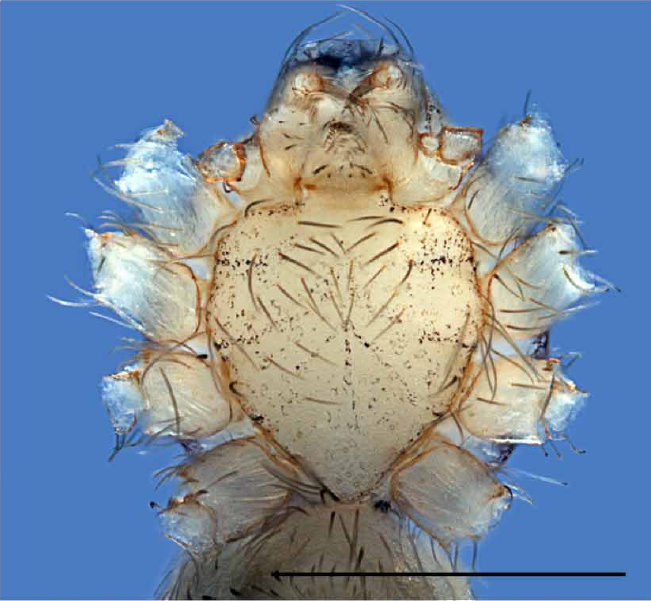
Ventral detailed view of a male's prosoma

In females, the anterolateral spinnerets have one major ampullaceous gland from a cylindrical tubercle and three piriform glands from flat tubercles. The posteromedian spinnerets bear one minor ampullaceous gland and three aciniform glands, while the posterolateral spinnerets have six aciniform glands. The tubercles are structured similarly to those in males.

=== Genital morphology ===
In males, the small, narrow, slit-like epigastric furrow contains a sperm pore located near the anterior spiracles (breathing openings). The symmetrical pedipalps (modified head appendages) are of average size and minimally sclerotized. The proximal segments are white, and the trochanters (hip segments) of the pedipalps are unmodified and of average size, while the femora are twice as long as the trochanters, lacking posterior rounded or lateral expansions. The trochanters contact the patellae basally. The patellae are shorter than the femora, unmodified, and lack prolateral rows of rib-like structures or modified bristle-like setae. The tibial margin is ventrally swollen. The cymbium (the foremost part of the bulb) is white and egg-shaped dorsally, not fused to the bulb or protruding beyond its distal tip. It lacks feathered or robust setae or patchy setal formations. The bulb is one to one-and-a-half times wider than the cymbium, pear-shaped, robust, with a slightly concave frontal margin, and tapers apically. The long, medially curved embolus (the final sclerite of the bulb) is simple, dark, tubular, and apically flattened, with a blunt, grooved, pale tip. The distally sclerotized conductor (appendage) is attached only distally to the bulb, abruptly interrupted, and has a weakly developed vesicle (oval sac) internally. It connects to the embolus via a thin-walled basal duct, with its distal part sclerotized. A tendon runs from the cymbium’s base to the vesicle’s distal end.

In females, the anterior epigastric margin is strongly sclerotized, with a transverse T-shaped anterior sclerite visible when transparent. This well-developed sclerite is short, robust, and adorned with branched ridges anteriorly and dorsally near the extremities. Between the epigastric region and the sclerite, anteroventrally, lies a larger, square, anteriorly positioned spermatheca (sperm receptacle), basally connected to the sclerite and extending to its lateral projections. The spermatheca is half as wide as the anterior sclerite and its projection, square-shaped, and dorsally and apically lined with rows of glandular ducts confined to the frontal furrow. The anterior spermatheca terminates in a flattened apodeme-like structure with two weakly procurved lobes, which dorsally connect to the well-developed, egg-shaped posterior spermatheca arising from the anterior spermatheca’s base. The external uterus is not discernible.

== Distribution and habitat ==
The ivy parchment spider is widespread in Europe and has been introduced to the United States and Canada. In Europe, it has shown a tendency to expand its range over recent decades, with confirmed records in Germany, the Netherlands, Belgium, the Czech Republic, Austria, Switzerland, France, Italy, Spain, and Bulgaria.

Its habitats include forests, dry grasslands, and garrigue. As a synanthropic species, it is also commonly found in human dwellings. In southern Europe, it tends to inhabit natural environments outside human settlements.

== Conservation ==
Little information is available on the conservation status of the ivy parchment spider. In Germany, insufficient data exist for an assessment in the Red List of Threatened Species (2016), and the species is considered very rare there. In the Czech Republic’s Red List of Spiders (2015), it is categorized as Ecologically Sustainable (ES) per IUCN standards, indicating adaptability to various environments.

== Behavior ==
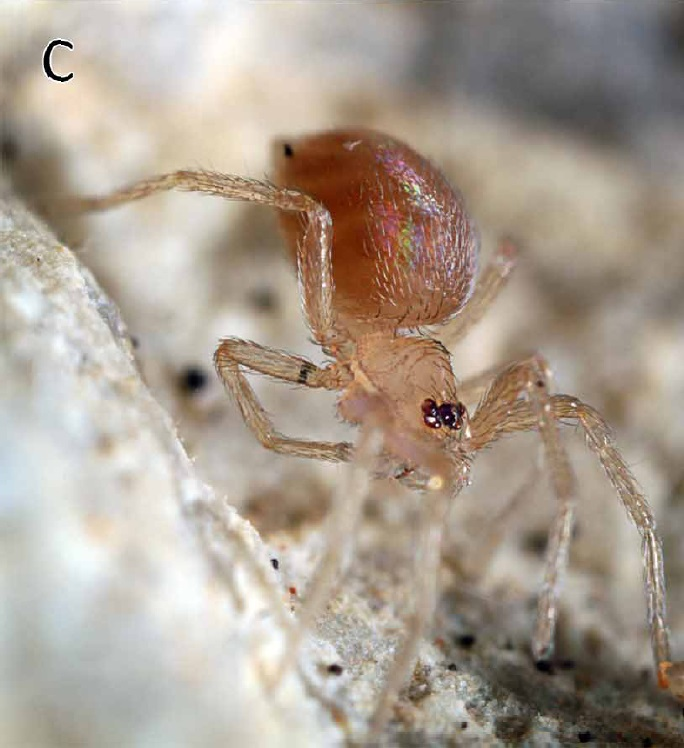
Female grooming itself.

The biology of the ivy parchment spider is poorly studied. Its phenology (activity period) for mature individuals of both sexes spans March to May and July to October. In Central Europe, adults of both sexes are likely present year-round in buildings.

== Taxonomy ==
The taxonomy of the ivy parchment spider has undergone several revisions. The species name inermis, derived from Latin meaning “unarmed,” reflects its spineless body. As the only species in the monotypic genus Tapinesthis, it is the type species.

=== Taxonomic history ===
Eugène Simon first described the species in 1882 as Oonops inermis. In 1914, he established the genus Tapinesthis and reassigned the species as T. inermis, a designation that has since remained consistent.

=== Internal taxonomy ===
The genital structure of the ivy parchment spider resembles that of other spiders in the superfamily Dysderoidea, including Dysderidae (six-eyed spiders), Orsolobidae, Segestriidae (tube-dwelling spiders), and certain goblin spiders like Puan chechehet and Unicorn catleyi. This supports its placement within Oonopidae.

In the species' epigyne, glandular ducts are confined to the apical part of the anterior spermatheca, unlike other goblin spiders where ducts are located at the middle or base of the anterior sclerite, as in Heteroonops spinimanus or Oonopinus kilikus. Such ducts, also found in other spider families, likely secrete substances aiding sperm storage or retrieval.

=== Subfamily classification ===
In 1893, Eugène Simon proposed two informal groups, “molles” and “loricatae,” based on the presence of a scutum and body sclerotization. Alexander I. Petrunkevitch adopted this in 1923, recognizing them as the subfamilies Oonopinae and Gamasomorphinae within Oonopidae. In 1942, Joseph Conrad Chamberlin and Wilton Ivie added the monotypic subfamily Orchestininae, containing only the genus Orchestina. In 2012, Norman I. Platnick revised the goblin spider subfamilies based on tarsal organ structure (receptor number), conductor sclerotization in male pedipalps, and eye positioning, dividing them into Sulsulinae, Oonopinae, and the monotypic Orchestininae.

For the ivy parchment spider, these criteria are not fully definitive. Its eye arrangement is intermediate, not tightly clustered like Orchestininae nor widely spaced like Orchestina, with a near H-shaped pattern and slightly recurved posterior eye row. The absence of a thick, strongly sclerotized conductor in the male bulb aligns Tapinesthis with Oonopinae, though its conductor has a thin-walled section and a sclerotized distal part, distinct from Orchestina. The tarsal organ receptor pattern appears as 4-4-3-3 but is likely 3-3-2-2 due to bifurcated distal receptors, differing from both Platnick’s "simple" 3-3-2-2 and the plesiomorphic 4-4-3-3 patterns. Further research is needed to clarify its taxonomic relationships.
