= Ocyale (spider) =

Scientific classification
- Kingdom: Animalia
- Phylum: Arthropoda
- Subphylum: Chelicerata
- Class: Arachnida
- Order: Araneae
- Infraorder: Araneomorphae
- Family: Lycosidae
- Genus: Ocyale; Audouin, 1826

Type species
- Ocyale atalanta (nomen dubium) Audouin, 1826

Species
- See text

Synonyms
- Hippasosa Roewer, 1960

Genus of spiders

Ocyale is a wolf spider genus in the family Lycosidae.

As of October 2025, this genus includes one species and is a nomen dubium:

- Ocyale atalanta Audouin, 1826 – Israel (type species)

Species previously in this genus were transferred to Hippasosa, Arctosa and Tetralycosa.

== See also ==
- List of Lycosidae genera
