= Artoria lycosimorpha =

Simonstown Artoria Wolf Spider

Scientific classification
- Kingdom: Animalia
- Phylum: Arthropoda
- Subphylum: Chelicerata
- Class: Arachnida
- Order: Araneae
- Infraorder: Araneomorphae
- Family: Lycosidae
- Genus: Artoria
- Species: A. lycosimorpha

Binomial name
- Artoria lycosimorpha Strand, 1909

Synonyms
- Artoriella lycosimorpha Roewer, 1955

Species of spider

Artoria lycosimorpha is a species of spider in the family Lycosidae. It is endemic to South Africa and is commonly known as the Simonstown Artoria wolf spider.

== Distribution ==
Artoria lycosimorpha is known only from the type locality at Simonstown in the Western Cape, at an elevation of 125 m.

== Habitat ==
The species is a free-running ground dweller sampled from the Fynbos biome.

== Conservation ==
Artoria lycosimorpha is listed as Data Deficient for Taxonomic reasons by the South African National Biodiversity Institute. The species is known only from a juvenile, and additional sampling is needed to collect adults and determine the species' range.

== Taxonomy ==
The species was described by Embrik Strand in 1909 from Simonstown. Framenau (2002) regarded the species as incertae sedis. The holotype is housed at the Museum für Naturkunde in Berlin, Germany.
