= Belford National Park =

National park in Australia

- IUCN category Ia (strict nature reserve)
- Location within New South Wales Location within Australia
- Nearest city: Branxton
- Coordinates: 32.6484°S 151.3006°E
- Area: 2.88 square kilometres (1.11 mi^{2})
- Established: January 2003
- Governing body: NSW National Parks and Wildlife Service
- Website: https://www.nationalparks.nsw.gov.au/visit-a-park/parks/belford-national-park

Belford National Park is a national park in New South Wales, Australia, 5 km west of Branxton. The park is in the traditional country of the Wonnarua. The park was created in January 2003 under the Lower North East Regional Forest Agreement 2000. Previously, the park was the Belford State Forest. The park is 294 hectares of isolated forest bounded by the New England Highway to the south.

== Description ==
There are currently no visitor facilities in the park, and the only permitted activity is bushwalking. The only built trail is the Perimeter Fire Trail, accessible off the New England Highway. Kirkton Road bisects the park, but is not within park boundaries. The park is fully fenced.

== Flora and fauna ==
=== Flora ===
The predominant vegetation community in the park is Central Hunter Ironbark-Spotted Gum-Grey Box Forest, an endangered ecological community. The vulnerable slaty red gum is found within the park.

Several invasive nonnative plants are found in the park including African olive, prickly pear, tiger pear and mother of millions.

=== Fauna ===
19 species of mammals, 49 birds, 4 reptiles and 4 amphibians are found within the park. The park protects 8 species listed as vulnerable: the powerful owl, grey-crowned babbler, speckled warbler, spotted-tailed quoll, eastern bent-wing bat, eastern freetail-bat, large-footed myotis and squirrel glider.

Eight nonnative fauna species are found in the park and pose a threat to the native wildlife: dogs, rabbits, foxes, black rats, cats and Indian mynahs (and occasionally cows and horses).
