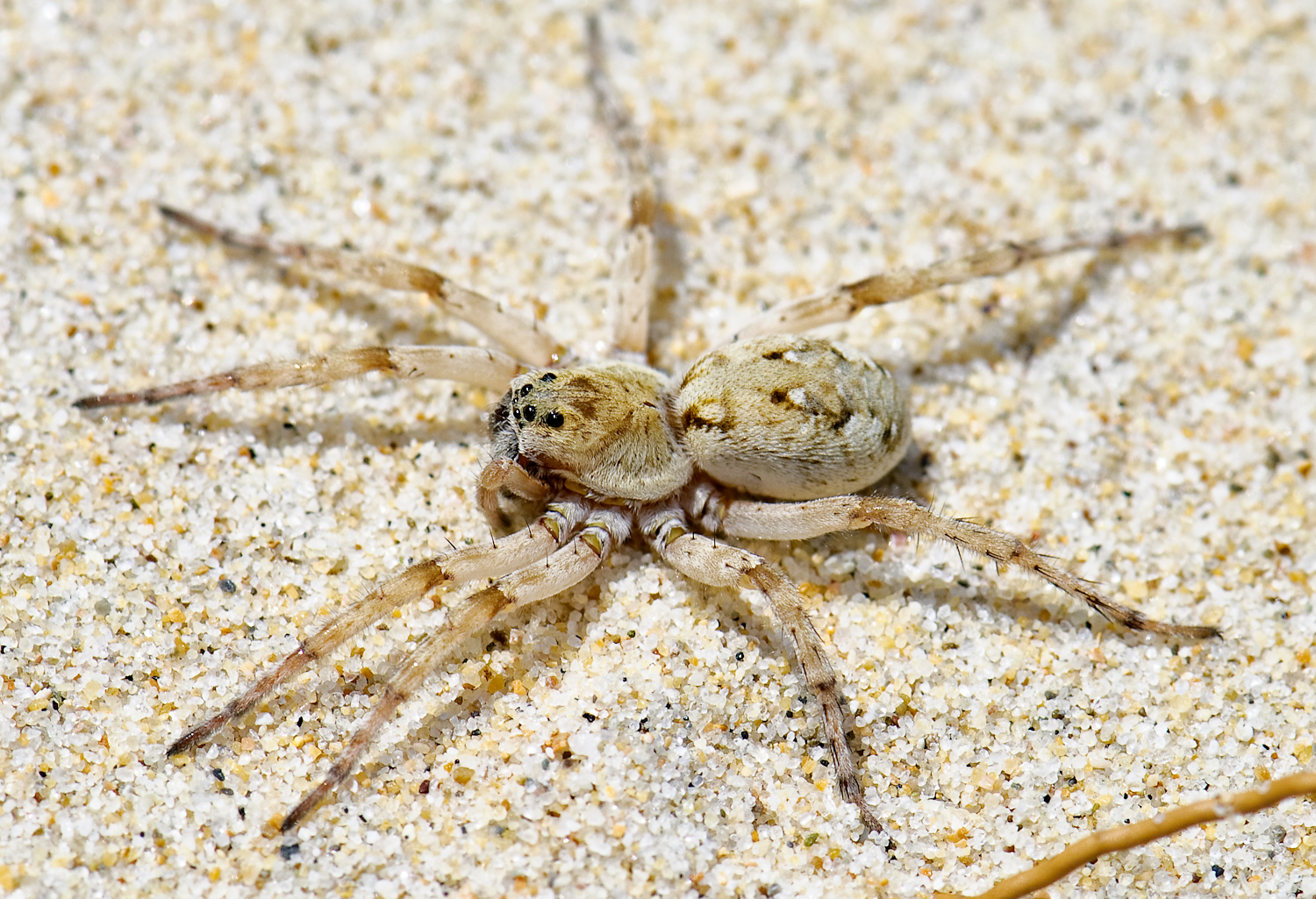

Scientific classification
- Domain: Eukaryota
- Kingdom: Animalia
- Phylum: Arthropoda
- Subphylum: Chelicerata
- Class: Arachnida
- Order: Araneae
- Infraorder: Araneomorphae
- Family: Lycosidae
- Subfamily: Artoriinae
- Genus: Tetralycosa; Roewer

Species
- Tetralycosa adarca Framenau & Hudson, 2017; Tetralycosa alteripa (McKay, 1976); Tetralycosa arabanae Framenau, Gotch & Austin, 2006; Tetralycosa baudinettei Framenau & Hudson, 2017; Tetralycosa caudex Framenau & Hudson, 2017; Tetralycosa eyrei (Hickman, 1944); Tetralycosa floundersi Framenau & Hudson, 2017; Tetralycosa halophila Framenau & Hudson, 2017; Tetralycosa oraria (L. Koch, 1876); Tetralycosa orariolia Framenau & Hudson, 2017; Tetralycosa rebecca Framenau & Hudson, 2017; Tetralycosa williamsi Framenau & Hudson, 2017; Tetralycosa wundurra (McKay, 1979)

= Tetralycosa =

Genus of spiders

Tetralycosa is a genus of Australian spiders in the family Lycosidae first described by Roewer in 1960, later revised by Framenau & Hudson to include thirteen species. Genetic studies show that these spiders all diverged from a common ancestor who likely wandered into the salty area and remained. They live exclusively in certain saline environments of Australia's interior, including coastal beaches, mound springs, clay pans, and salt lakes. There haven't been enough studies to establish a conservation status, but some species have only been found in solitary salt lakes, suggesting that the increase of mining, agriculture, recreational, and similar disturbances of these unique ecosystems may eventually lead to their extinction if not properly regulated.
