= Barbara Baehr =

German arachnologist working in Australia

- Born: Barbara C. Hoffmann; 25 February 1953 (age 73); Pforzheim, Germany
- Occupation: Research Scientist

Academic background
- Education: University of Tübingen

Academic work
- Discipline: Arachnology
- Institutions: Queensland Museum

Barbara Baehr (born Hoffmann; 25 February 1953) is a German research scientist, entomologist, arachnologist, and spider taxonomist. She has described over 400 new spider species, mostly from Australia. She is originally from Pforzheim, Germany.

== Education and work ==
Barbara Baehr obtained both her Staatsexamen and PhD in Zoology / Ecology at the University of Tübingen, Germany.

She worked as a scientific associate at the Bavarian State Collection of Zoology in Munich, Germany, from 1984 to 1998. During this time she also taught invertebrate zoology at LMU Munich from 1996 to 1998, and conducted spider excursions for students.

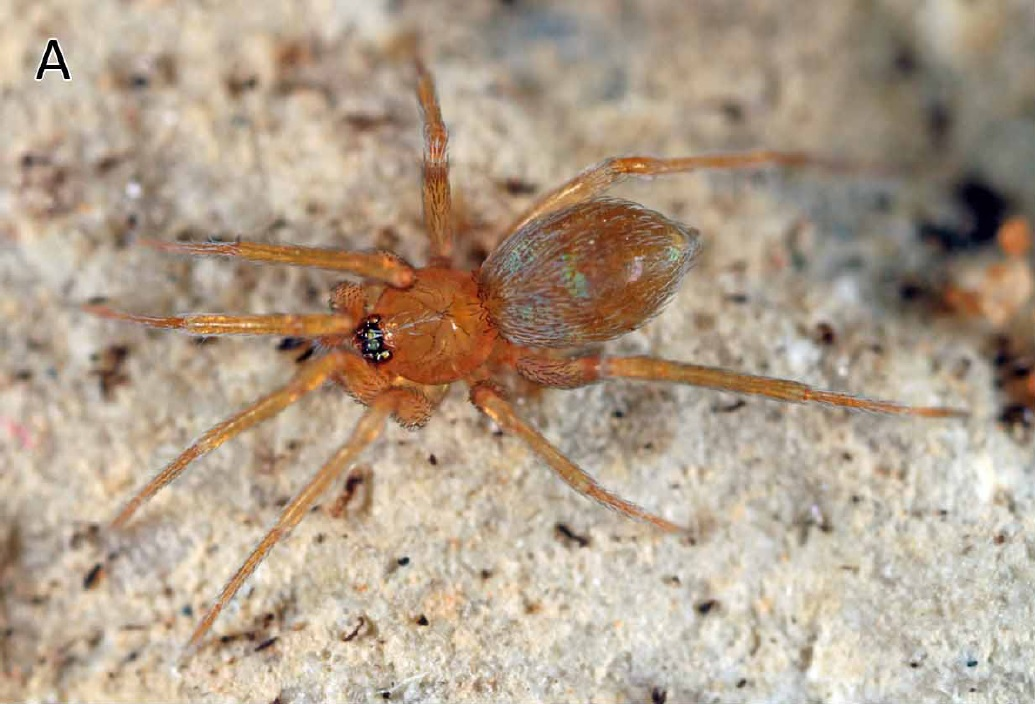
Tapinesthis inermis (Araneae, Oonopidae), Arnaud Henrard, Rudy Jocqué, Barbara C. Baehr

Following several research visits to Australia (Western Australian Museum, Perth, 1994; Queensland Museum, Brisbane, and Australian Museum, Sydney, 1999), she took a research fellow position at the Queensland Museum in January 2000. Her work there focused on an interactive key to spider subfamilies, and was funded by the Australian Biological Resources Study.

Her subsequent research emphasized on the taxonomy of the ant spider family Zodariidae, the long-tailed bark spider family Hersiliidae and the long-spinnereted ground spider family Prodidomidae (since transferred to Gnaphosidae as the subfamily Prodidominae).

== Publications ==
- Baehr, Barbara C.; Ubick, Darrell (2010). "A Review of the Asian Goblin Spider GenusCamptoscaphiella(Araneae: Oonopidae)". American Museum Novitates (3697). American Museum of Natural History (BioOne sponsored): 1–65. doi:10.1206/3697.2. ISSN 0003-0082. S2CID 85133418.
- Baehr, Barbara C.; Harvey, Mark S.; Smith, Helen M. (4 March 2010). "The Goblin Spiders of the New Endemic Australian Genus Cavisternum (Araneae: Oonopidae)". American Museum Novitates (3684). American Museum of Natural History (BioOne sponsored): 1–40. doi:10.1206/667.1. ISSN 0003-0082. S2CID 83677917.
- Baehr, Barbara C.; Whyte, Robert (24 August 2016). "The Peacock Spiders (Araneae: Salticidae: Maratus) of the Queensland Museum, including six new species". Zootaxa. 4154 (5). Magnolia Press: 501–525. doi:10.11646/zootaxa.4154.5.1. ISSN 1175-5334. PMID 27615856.
- Pugh, P.R.; Haddock, S.H.D. (10 November 2016). "A description of two new species of the genus Erenna (Siphonophora: Physonectae: Erennidae), with notes on recently collected specimens of other Erenna species". Zootaxa. 4189 (3). Magnolia Press: 401. doi:10.11646/zootaxa.4189.3.1. ISSN 1175-5334. PMID 27988743.
- Framenau, Volker W.; Baehr, Barbara C. (23 December 2016). "Revision of the Australian Union-Jack wolf spiders, genus Tasmanicosa (Araneae, Lycosidae, Lycosinae)". Zootaxa. 4213 (1). Magnolia Press: 1–82. doi:10.11646/zootaxa.4213.1.1. ISSN 1175-5334. PMID 28006790.

== Filmography ==
- Tarantula: Australia's King of Spiders (2005) Herself – Queensland Museum
