= Alloclubionoides bifidus =

Scientific classification
- Domain: Eukaryota
- Kingdom: Animalia
- Phylum: Arthropoda
- Subphylum: Chelicerata
- Class: Arachnida
- Order: Araneae
- Infraorder: Araneomorphae
- Family: Agelenidae
- Genus: Alloclubionoides
- Species: A. bifidus

Binomial name
- Alloclubionoides bifidus (Paik, 1976)

Synonyms
- Coelotes bifidus Ambanus bifidus

Species of spider

Alloclubiooides bifidus is a spider in the family Agelenidae, and was first described in 1976 by Paik Kap Yong as Coelotes bifidus. Its current name of Alloclubionoides bifidus was given in 2018 by Lee and Lee.

This spider is endemic to the Korean peninsula.
