= Alloclubionoides dimidiatus =

Scientific classification
- Kingdom: Animalia
- Phylum: Arthropoda
- Subphylum: Chelicerata
- Class: Arachnida
- Order: Araneae
- Infraorder: Araneomorphae
- Family: Agelenidae
- Genus: Alloclubionoides
- Species: A. dimidiatus

Binomial name
- Alloclubionoides dimidiatus (Paik, 1974)

Synonyms
- Coelotes dimidiatus Paik, 1974; Ambanus dimidiatus (Paik, 1974); Ambanus kimi (Paik, 1974)

Species of spider

Alloclubionoides dimidiatus is a spider in the family Agelenidae, and was first described in 1974 by Paik Kap Yong as Coelotes dimidiatus.

This spider is endemic to South Korea, where its typical habitat is Palgongsan Mountain in Daegu. It makes its webs under rocks on mountainsides.
