= Arctosa hallasanensis =

Scientific classification
- Kingdom: Animalia
- Phylum: Arthropoda
- Subphylum: Chelicerata
- Class: Arachnida
- Order: Araneae
- Infraorder: Araneomorphae
- Family: Lycosidae
- Genus: Arctosa
- Species: A. hallasanensis

Binomial name
- Arctosa hallasanensis Paik, 1994)

Species of spider

Arctosa hallasanensis (Hallasan rice paddy wolf spider) is a wolf spider species in the family Lycosidae found on the Korean Peninsula, on Mount Hallasan, whence its species epithet and common name.

It was first described by Paik Kap Yong in 1994.

It is endemic to the Korean Peninsula.
