= Arctosa pungcheunensis =

Scientific classification
- Kingdom: Animalia
- Phylum: Arthropoda
- Subphylum: Chelicerata
- Class: Arachnida
- Order: Araneae
- Infraorder: Araneomorphae
- Family: Lycosidae
- Genus: Arctosa
- Species: A. pungcheunensis

Binomial name
- Arctosa pungcheunensis Paik, 1994)

Species of spider

Arctosa pungcheunensis, is a wolf spider species in the family Lycosidae endemic to the Korean Peninsula.

It was first described by Paik Kap Yong in 1994. The species epithet, pungcheunensis, describes it as being found in Pungcheon-myeon. (See -ensis, in wiktionary)
