= Alloclubionoides =

Scientific classification
- Kingdom: Animalia
- Phylum: Arthropoda
- Subphylum: Chelicerata
- Class: Arachnida
- Order: Araneae
- Infraorder: Araneomorphae
- Family: Agelenidae
- Genus: Alloclubionoides; Paik, 1992

Type species
- A. coreanus Paik, 1992

Species
- 35, see text

Synonyms
- Ambanus

Genus of spiders

Alloclubionoides is a genus of Asian funnel weavers first circumscribed by Paik Kap Yong in 1992.

== Species ==
As of October 2026 it contains thirty-five species:

- Alloclubionoides amurensis (Ovtchinnikov, 1999) – Russia (Far East)
- Alloclubionoides bifidus (Paik, 1976) – Korea
- Alloclubionoides cochlea (Kim, Lee & Kwon, 2007) – Korea
- Alloclubionoides coreanus Paik, 1992 – Korea
- Alloclubionoides dimidiatus (Paik, 1974) – Korea
- Alloclubionoides euini (Paik, 1976) – Korea
- Alloclubionoides geumensis Seo, 2014 – Korea
- Alloclubionoides grandivulvus (Yaginuma, 1969) – Japan
- Alloclubionoides huanren Zhang, Zhu & Wang, 2017 – China
- Alloclubionoides hwaseongensis Kim, Yoo & Lee, 2018 – Korea
- Alloclubionoides imi Kim, Yoo & Lee, 2018 – Korea
- Alloclubionoides jaegeri (Kim, 2007) – Korea
- Alloclubionoides jirisanensis Kim, 2009 – Korea
- Alloclubionoides kimi (Paik, 1974) – Korea
- Alloclubionoides lunatus (Paik, 1976) – Korea
- Alloclubionoides mandzhuricus (Ovtchinnikov, 1999) – Russia (Far East)
- Alloclubionoides meniscatus (Zhu & Wang, 1991) – China
- Alloclubionoides naejangensis Seo, 2014 – Korea
- Alloclubionoides namhaensis Seo, 2014 – Korea
- Alloclubionoides namhansanensis Kim, Yoo & Lee, 2018 – Korea
- Alloclubionoides napolovi (Ovtchinnikov, 1999) – Russia (Far East)
- Alloclubionoides nariceus (Zhu & Wang, 1994) – China
- Alloclubionoides nasuta Kim, Yoo & Lee, 2018 – Korea
- Alloclubionoides ovatus (Paik, 1976) – Korea
- Alloclubionoides paiki (Ovtchinnikov, 1999) – Russia (Far East)
- Alloclubionoides paikwunensis (Kim & Jung, 1993) – Korea
- Alloclubionoides pseudonariceus (Zhang, Zhu & Song, 2007) – China
- Alloclubionoides quadrativulvus (Paik, 1974) – Korea
- Alloclubionoides rostratus (Song, Zhu, Gao & Guan, 1993) – China
- Alloclubionoides solea Kim & Kim, 2012 – Korea
- Alloclubionoides terdecimus (Paik, 1978) – Korea
- Alloclubionoides triangulatus (Zhang, Zhu & Song, 2007) – China
- Alloclubionoides trisaccatus (Zhang, Zhu & Song, 2007) – China
- Alloclubionoides wolchulsanensis Kim, 2009 – Korea
- Alloclubionoides yangyangensis Seo, 2014 – Korea
