= Alloclubionoides terdecimus =

Scientific classification
- Domain: Eukaryota
- Kingdom: Animalia
- Phylum: Arthropoda
- Subphylum: Chelicerata
- Class: Arachnida
- Order: Araneae
- Infraorder: Araneomorphae
- Family: Agelenidae
- Genus: Alloclubionoides
- Species: A. terdecimus

Binomial name
- Alloclubionoides terdecimus (Paik, 1978)

Synonyms
- Coelotes terdecimus Ambanus terdecimus

Species of spider

Alloclubiooides terdecimus is a spider in the family Agelenidae, and was first described in 1978 by Paik Kap Yong as Coelotes terdecimus. Its current name of Alloclubionoides terdecimus was given in 2014 by Bo-keun Seo (서보근).

This spider is endemic to the Korean peninsula, where it is found on the island Geojedo in South Gyeongsang Province, South Korea.
