= Arctosa chungjooensis =

Scientific classification
- Kingdom: Animalia
- Phylum: Arthropoda
- Subphylum: Chelicerata
- Class: Arachnida
- Order: Araneae
- Infraorder: Araneomorphae
- Family: Lycosidae
- Genus: Arctosa
- Species: A. chungjooensis

Binomial name
- Arctosa chungjooensis Paik, 1994

Species of spider

Arctosa chungooensis (Chungju rice paddy wolf spider) is a wolf spider endemic to the Korean Peninsula.

It was first described in 1994 by Paik Kap Yong.

Females have a body length of 8.5 mm, while males' body length is 5..5 mm. The carapace is a yellowish brown. Generally this spider is observed near water: in wetlands, rice paddies and fields, from June to August.
