= Alloclubionoides coreanus =

Scientific classification
- Domain: Eukaryota
- Kingdom: Animalia
- Phylum: Arthropoda
- Subphylum: Chelicerata
- Class: Arachnida
- Order: Araneae
- Infraorder: Araneomorphae
- Family: Agelenidae
- Genus: Alloclubionoides
- Species: A. coreanus

Binomial name
- Alloclubionoides coreanus Paik, 1992

Synonyms
- Alloclubionoides boryeongensis Kim & Ye, 2013; Ambanus coreana Kim & Lee, 2006

Species of spider

Alloclubionoides coreanus is a spider in the family Agelenidae, and was first described in 1992 by Paik Kap Yong. It is the type species of the genus.

This spider is endemic to South Korea, where it is found in Gwangneung, Gyeonggi-do.
