= Coscinida ulleungensis =

Scientific classification
- Domain: Eukaryota
- Kingdom: Animalia
- Phylum: Arthropoda
- Subphylum: Chelicerata
- Class: Arachnida
- Order: Araneae
- Infraorder: Araneomorphae
- Family: Theridiidae
- Genus: Coscinida
- Species: C. ulleungensis

Binomial name
- Coscinida ulleungensis Paik, 1995

Species of spider

Coscinida ulleungensis is a species of comb-footed spider in the family Theridiidae. It is found in Korea.
