= Arctosa keumjeungsana =

Scientific classification
- Kingdom: Animalia
- Phylum: Arthropoda
- Subphylum: Chelicerata
- Class: Arachnida
- Order: Araneae
- Infraorder: Araneomorphae
- Family: Lycosidae
- Genus: Arctosa
- Species: A. keumjeungsana

Binomial name
- Arctosa keumjeungsana Paik, 1994)

Species of spider

Arctosa keumjeungsana is a wolf spider species in the family Lycosidae found in the Russian Far East.

It was first described by Paik Kap Yong in 1994.
