= Kuncosa kwangreungensis =

Scientific classification
- Kingdom: Animalia
- Phylum: Arthropoda
- Subphylum: Chelicerata
- Class: Arachnida
- Order: Araneae
- Infraorder: Araneomorphae
- Family: Lycosidae
- Genus: Kuncosa
- Species: K. kwangreungensis

Binomial name
- Kuncosa kwangreungensis (Paik & Tanaka, 1986)

Synonyms
- Arctosa kwangreungensis Paik & Tanaka, 1986

Species of spider

Kuncosa kwangreungensis, synonym Arctosa kwangreungensis, (Gwangneung rice paddy wolf spider) is a wolf spider species in the family Lycosidae found on the Korean Peninsula.

It was first described by Paik Kap Yong and Hozumi Tanaka in 1986 as Arctosa kwangreungensis, and moved to the genus Kuncosa in 2025. The species epithet, kwangreungensis, describes it as being found in Gwangneung. (See -ensis, in wiktionary)
