= Arctosa coreana =

Scientific classification
- Domain: Eukaryota
- Kingdom: Animalia
- Phylum: Arthropoda
- Subphylum: Chelicerata
- Class: Arachnida
- Order: Araneae
- Infraorder: Araneomorphae
- Family: Lycosidae
- Genus: Arctosa
- Species: A. coreana

Binomial name
- Arctosa coreana Paik, 1994

Species of spider

Arctosa coreana is a wolf spider endemic to the Korean Peninsula.

It was first described in 1994 by Paik Kap Yong.

Females have a body length of 6.5–7.5 mm, while males' body length is 5.0–6.0 mm. The spherical carapace is a reddish brown. Generally this spider is observed in grasslands, from April to August.
