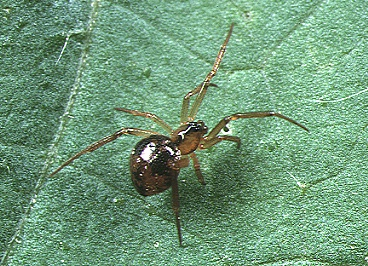
- Coscinida japonica

Scientific classification
- Kingdom: Animalia
- Phylum: Arthropoda
- Subphylum: Chelicerata
- Class: Arachnida
- Order: Araneae
- Infraorder: Araneomorphae
- Family: Theridiidae
- Genus: Coscinida; Simon, 1895

Type species
- C. tibialis Simon, 1895

Species
- 17, see text

Synonyms
- Loxonychia Tullgren, 1910; Theridiella Tullgren, 1910

= Coscinida =

Genus of spiders

Coscinida is a genus of comb-footed spiders that was first described by Eugène Louis Simon in 1895.

== Species ==
As of May 2020 it contains seventeen species, found in Asia, Europe, and Africa:

- Coscinida asiatica Zhu & Zhang, 1992 – China
- Coscinida conica Yang, Irfan & Peng, 2019 – China
- Coscinida coreana Paik, 1995 – Korea
- Coscinida decemguttata Miller, 1970 – Congo
- Coscinida gentilis Simon, 1895 – Sri Lanka
- Coscinida hunanensis Yin, Peng & Bao, 2006 – China
- Coscinida japonica Yoshida, 1994 – Japan
- Coscinida leviorum Locket, 1968 – Angola
- Coscinida lugubris (Tullgren, 1910) – Tanzania
- Coscinida novemnotata Simon, 1895 – Sri Lanka
- Coscinida proboscidea Simon, 1899 – Indonesia (Sumatra)
- Coscinida propinqua Miller, 1970 – Angola
- Coscinida shimenensis Yin, Peng & Bao, 2006 – China
- Coscinida tibialis Simon, 1895 (type) – Africa, southern Europe, Turkey, Israel, Yemen. Introduced to Thailand
- Coscinida triangulifera Simon, 1904 – Sri Lanka, Indonesia (Java)
- Coscinida ulleungensis Paik, 1995 – Korea
- Coscinida yei Yin & Bao, 2012 – China

Formerly included:

- C. subtilis Simon, 1895 (Transferred to Stemmops)
