= Arctosa pargongensis =

Scientific classification
- Kingdom: Animalia
- Phylum: Arthropoda
- Subphylum: Chelicerata
- Class: Arachnida
- Order: Araneae
- Infraorder: Araneomorphae
- Family: Lycosidae
- Genus: Arctosa
- Species: A. pargongensis

Binomial name
- Arctosa pargongensis Paik, 1994)

Species of spider

Arctosa pargongensis, the Palgong rice paddy wolf spider, is a wolf spider species in the family Lycosidae found on the Korean Peninsula.

It was first described by Paik Kap Yong in 1994. The species epithet, palgongensis, describes it as being found on Palgong(san). (See -ensis, in wiktionary)
