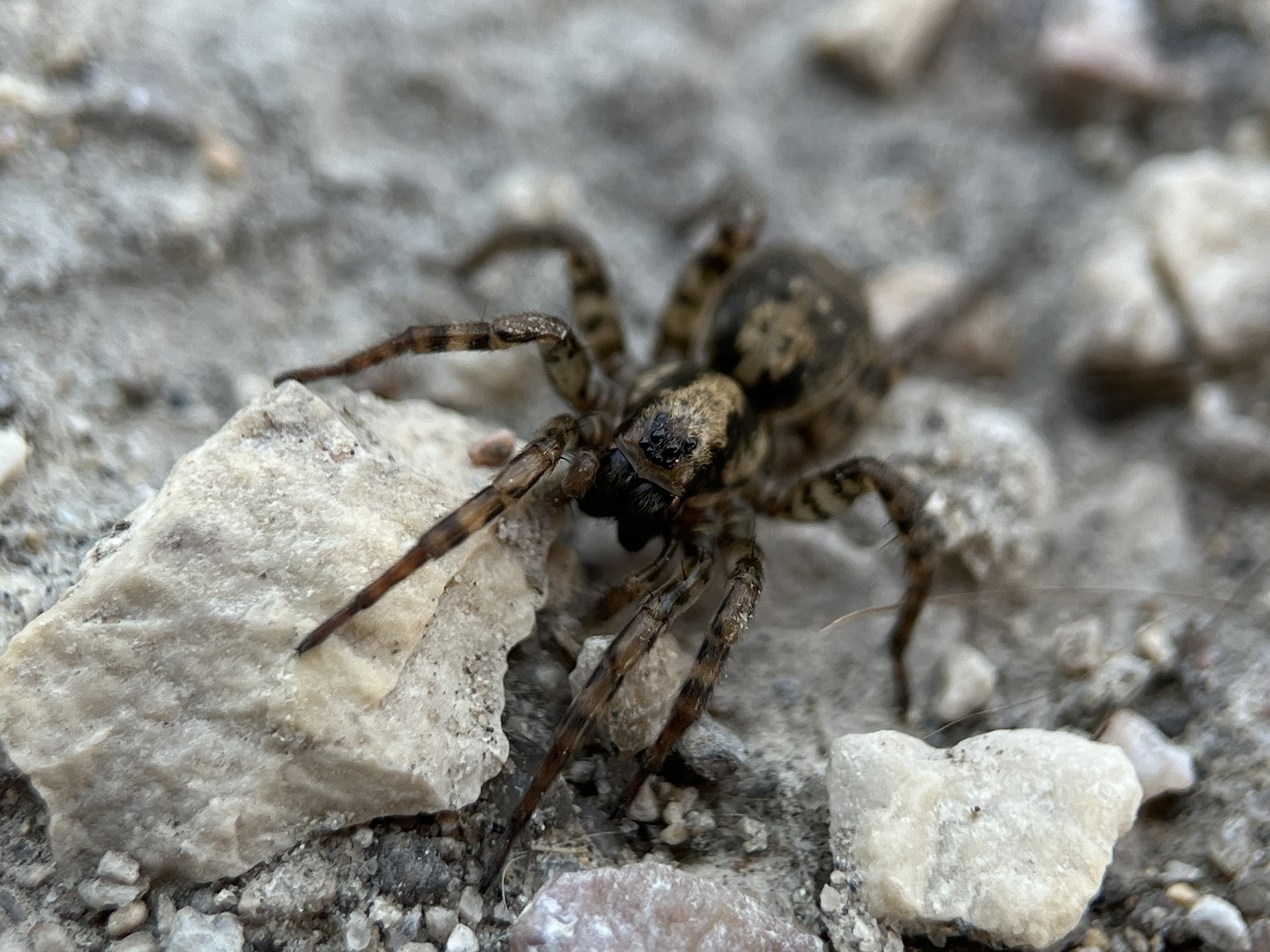

Conservation status
- Secure (NatureServe)

Scientific classification
- Kingdom: Animalia
- Phylum: Arthropoda
- Subphylum: Chelicerata
- Class: Arachnida
- Order: Araneae
- Infraorder: Araneomorphae
- Family: Lycosidae
- Genus: Arctosa
- Species: A. emertoni

Binomial name
- Arctosa emertoni Gertsch, 1934

= Arctosa emertoni =

Species of spider

Arctosa emertoni is a species of wolf spiders in the family Lycosidae. It is found in the USA and Canada.
