= Coscinida proboscidea =

Scientific classification
- Kingdom: Animalia
- Phylum: Arthropoda
- Subphylum: Chelicerata
- Class: Arachnida
- Order: Araneae
- Infraorder: Araneomorphae
- Family: Theridiidae
- Genus: Coscinida
- Species: C. proboscidea

Binomial name
- Coscinida proboscidea Simon, 1899

Species of spider

Coscinida proboscidea is a species of comb-footed spider in the family Theridiidae. It is found in Sumatra.
