= Arctosa sanctaerosae =

Conservation status
- Vulnerable (NatureServe)

Scientific classification
- Kingdom: Animalia
- Phylum: Arthropoda
- Subphylum: Chelicerata
- Class: Arachnida
- Order: Araneae
- Infraorder: Araneomorphae
- Family: Lycosidae
- Genus: Arctosa
- Species: A. sanctaerosae

Binomial name
- Arctosa sanctaerosae Gertsch & Wallace, 1935

Species of spider

Arctosa sanctaerosae, the Santa Rosa wolf spider, is a species of wolf spider in the family Lycosidae. It is found in the United States.
