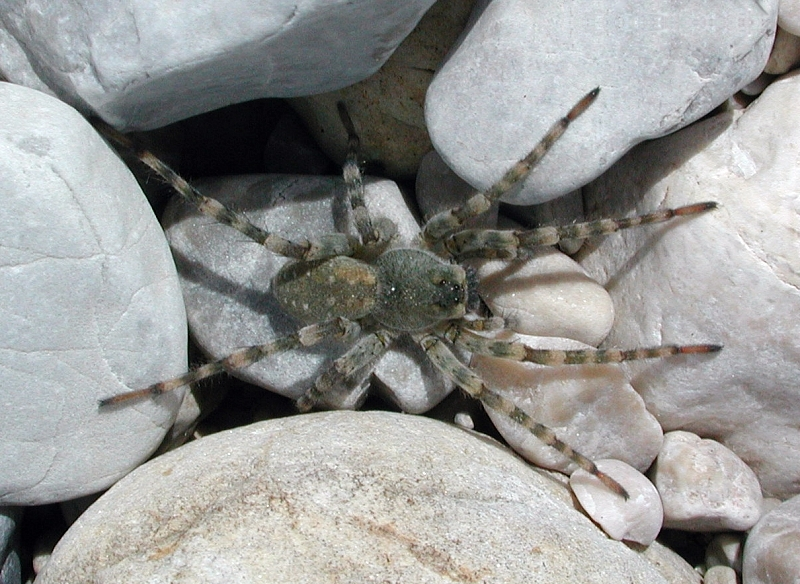
- A. cinerea
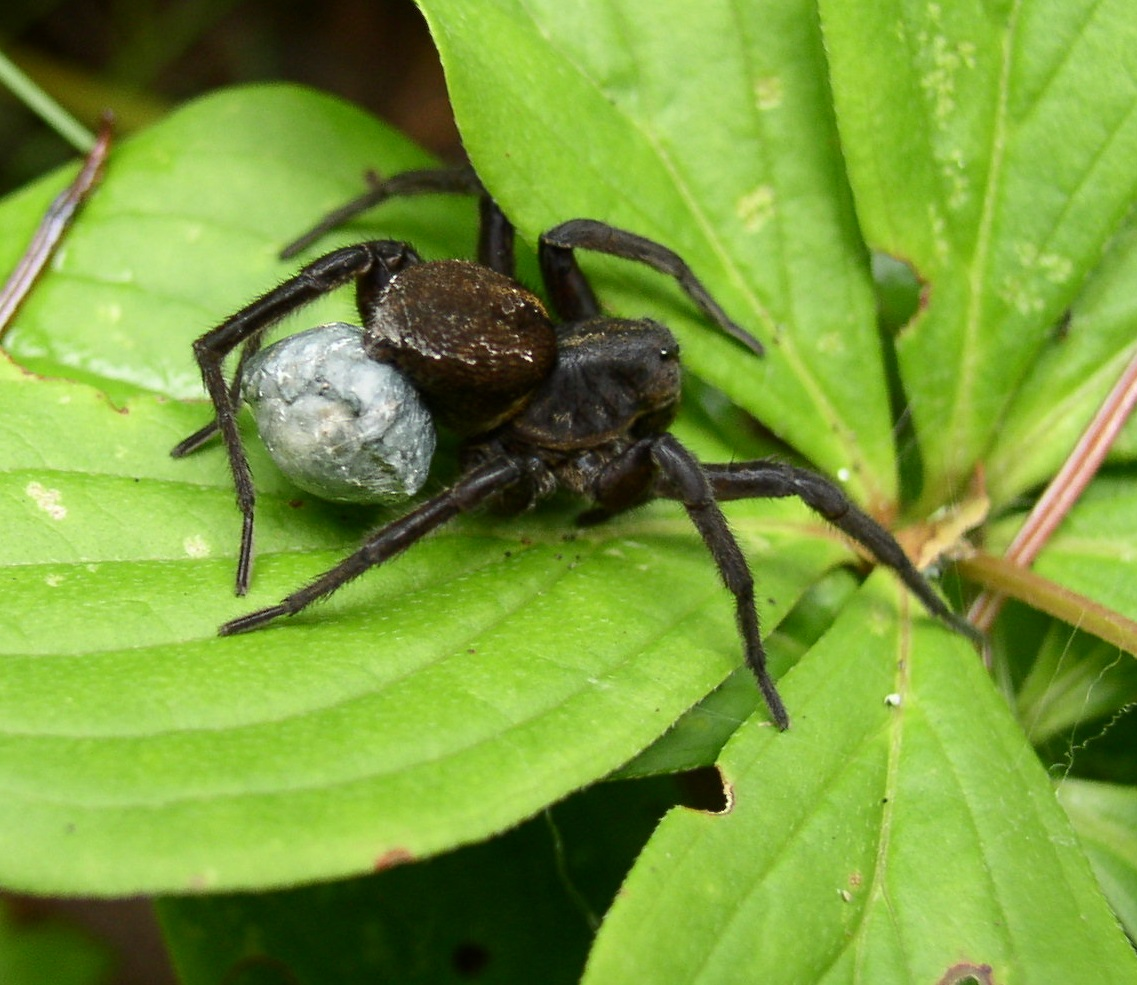
- A. raptor with egg sac

Scientific classification
- Kingdom: Animalia
- Phylum: Arthropoda
- Subphylum: Chelicerata
- Class: Arachnida
- Order: Araneae
- Infraorder: Araneomorphae
- Family: Lycosidae
- Genus: Arctosa; C. L. Koch, 1847

Type species
- Aranea cinerea Fabricius, 1777

Species
- See text

Diversity
- 165 species

Synonyms
- Alopecosella Roewer, 1960; Arctosella Roewer, 1960; Arkalosula Roewer, 1960; Bonacosa Roewer, 1960; Leaena Simon, 1885; Leaenella Roewer, 1960; Tetrarctosa Roewer, 1960; Tricca Simon, 1889; Triccosta Roewer, 1960

= Arctosa =

Genus of spiders

Arctosa is a genus of wolf spiders first described by Carl Ludwig Koch in 1847, with more than 150 described species.

== Life style ==
Arctosa species are swift runners with relatively keen eyesight. Most species inhabit sandy places such as seashores or the banks of rivers and lakes, though some occupy heath or lichen habitats in high mountains. The principal body colors are gray, off-white, and tawny brown, matching their habitat.

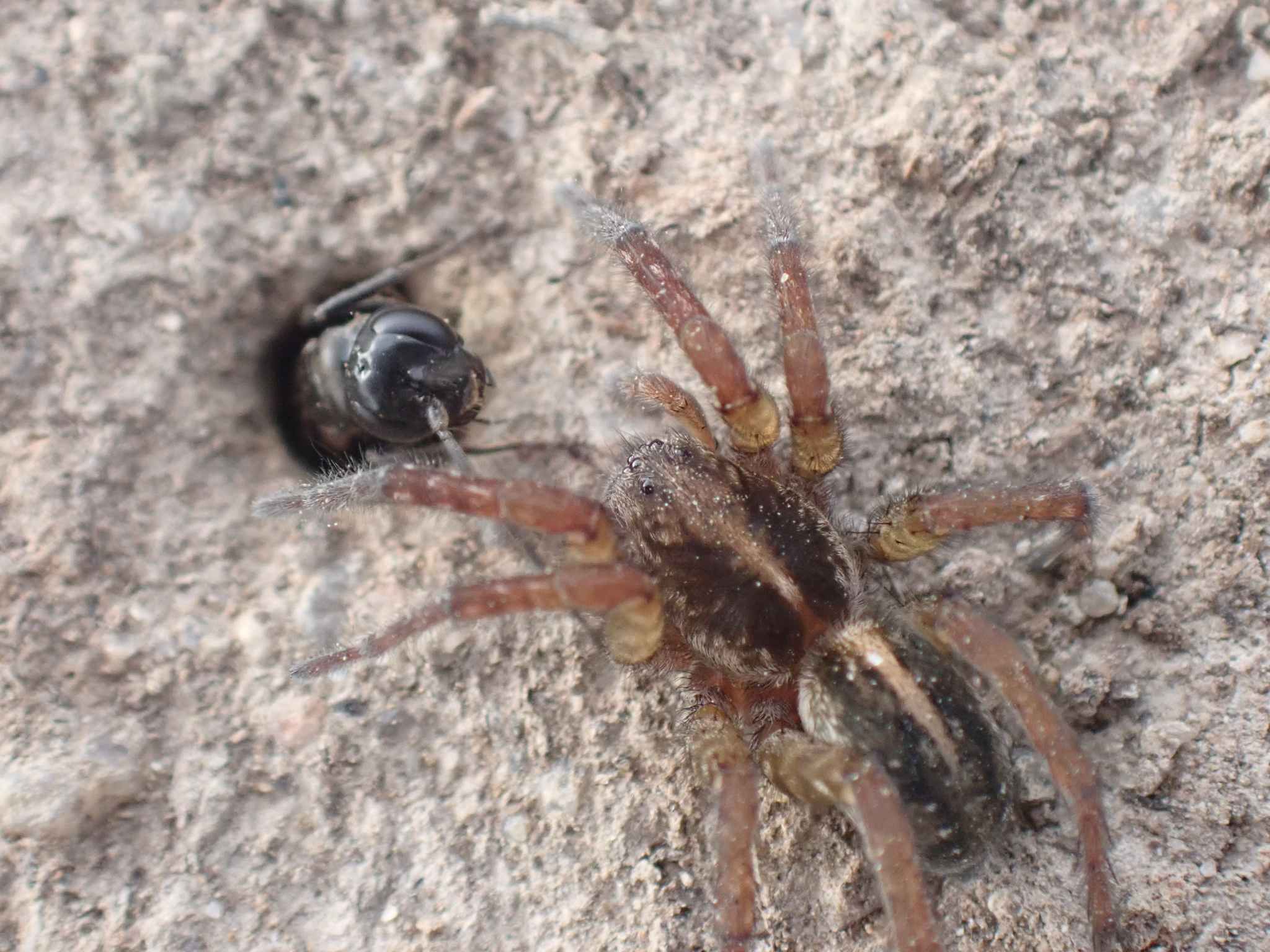
A. fulvolineata in France

== Description ==
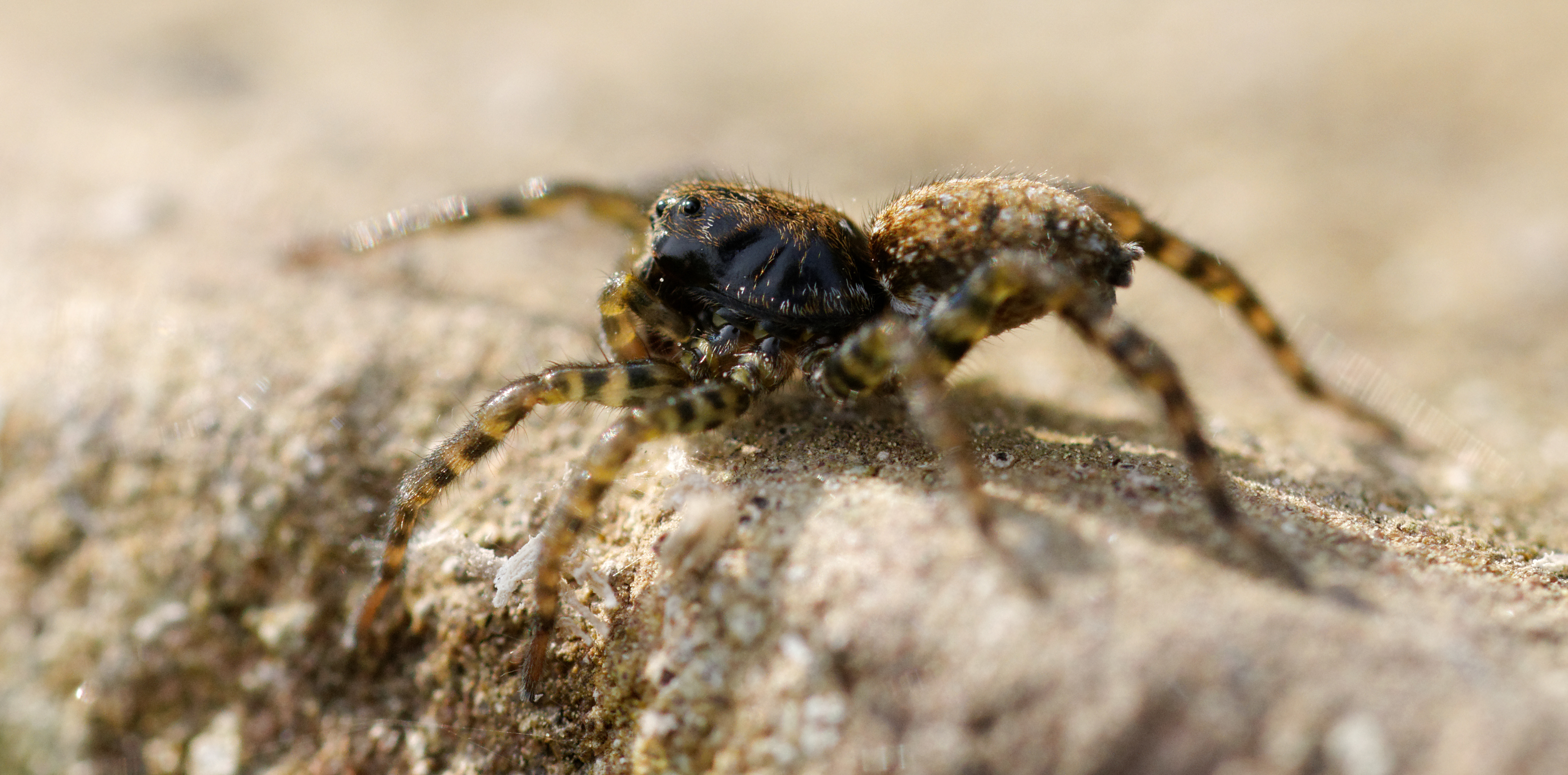
Arctosa sp.

Arctosa species are medium-sized wolf spiders with a total length ranging from 4.5 to 16.0 mm.

The carapace is broad and rather low, with relatively uniform height between the dorsal groove and posterior row of eyes. The carapace is usually glabrous or nearly so, colored yellow, off-white, or mottled with gray, yellow, or brown.

The anterior row of eyes may be straight, somewhat procurved, or recurved, and varies in length relative to the middle row. The promargin of the fang furrow bears two or three teeth, while the retromargin has three teeth. The abdomen is usually pale and mottled similar to the carapace.

The legs are usually pale and robust with dark bands, lightly scopulate. Tibia III bears two dorsal macrosetae or one plus a basal bristle, along with one to three retrolateral macrosetae. The trochanters are usually deeply notched at the tip on the ventral surface.

The terminal apophysis of the male pedipalp is conspicuous and occurs in two parts or in one part of two different shapes and degrees of sclerotization. The embolus is straight or curved and largely hidden by the median apophysis in ventral view. The epigyne of females usually has a conspicuous atrium divided by a median septum and lacks a hood.

Females usually attend their eggs in silk-lined burrows rather than carrying them about, and most species appear to be nocturnal.

== Taxonomy ==
The numerous African Arctosa species require revision.

== Species ==
As of June 2026, this genus includes 166 species and two subspecies. These species have articles on Wikipedia:

- Arctosa albida (Simon, 1898) – South Africa
- Arctosa alpigena (Doleschall, 1852) – North America, Greenland, Europe, Russia (Europe to Far East)
  - A. a. lamperti Dahl, 1908 – France, central and northern Europe, Baltic states, Romania, Russia (Europe)
- Arctosa brevispina (Lessert, 1915) – Tanzania, South Africa
- Arctosa capensis Roewer, 1960 – South Africa
- Arctosa chungjooensis Paik, 1994 – Korea
- Arctosa cinerea (Fabricius, 1777) – Europe, North Africa, Congo, Caucasus, Russia (Europe to Far East), Middle East, Kazakhstan, China, Korea, Japan (type species)
- Arctosa coreana Paik, 1994 – Korea
- Arctosa emertoni Gertsch, 1934 – Canada, United States
- Arctosa excellens (Simon, 1876) – Portugal, Spain
- Arctosa figurata (Simon, 1876) – Europe, Caucasus
- Arctosa fulvolineata (Lucas, 1846) – Britain, Portugal, Spain, France, Italy, Slovenia, North Africa, Turkey
- Arctosa hallasanensis Paik. 1994 South Korea
- Arctosa keumjeungsana Paik. 1994 Russia
- Arctosa lawrencei (Roewer, 1960) – South Africa
- Arctosa leopardus (Sundevall, 1833) – Europe, Turkey, Caucasus, Russia (Europe to South Siberia), Iran, Central Asia
- Arctosa lightfooti (Purcell, 1903) – South Africa
- Arctosa littoralis (Hentz, 1844) – Canada to Panama
- Arctosa nivosa (Purcell, 1903) – South Africa
- Arctosa oneili (Purcell, 1903) – South Africa
- Arctosa pargongensis Paik, 1994
- Arctosa pungcheunensis Paik, 1994
- Arctosa perita (Latreille, 1799) – Europe, North Africa, Turkey, Caucasus, Iran. Introduced to Canada
- Arctosa promontorii (Pocock, 1900) – South Africa
- Arctosa raptor (Kulczyński, 1885) – Nepal, Russia (Kamchatka), Alaska, Canada, United States
- Arctosa rubicunda (Keyserling, 1877) – Canada, United States
- Arctosa sanctaerosae Gertsch & Wallace, 1935 – United States
- Arctosa similis Schenkel, 1938 – Canary Is. to Cyprus, Iraq, Iran
- Arctosa stigmosa (Thorell, 1875) – France and Norway to Russia (West Siberia), Turkey, Iran
- Arctosa tbilisiensis Mcheidze, 1946 – Greece, Bulgaria, Turkey, Caucasus (Russia, Georgia, Azerbaijan), Iraq, Iran, Afghanistan
- Arctosa tenuissima (Purcell, 1903) – South Africa
- Arctosa transvaalana Roewer, 1960 – South Africa
- Arctosa virgo (Chamberlin, 1925) – United States
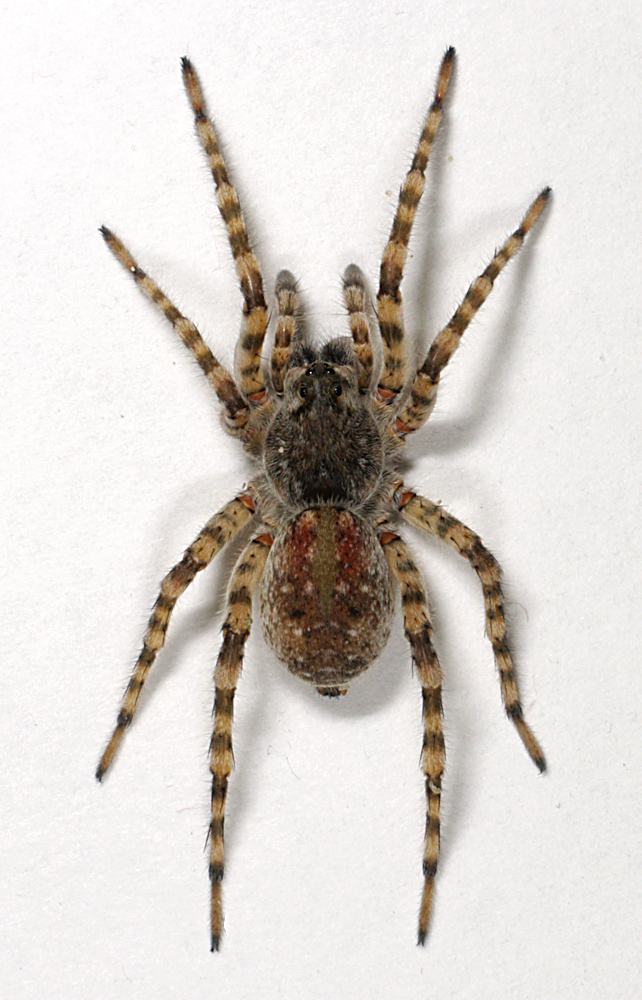
A. cinerea

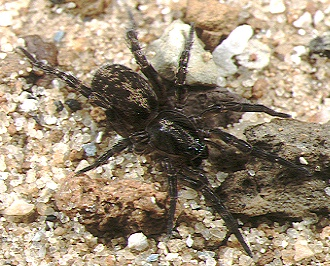
female A. japonica

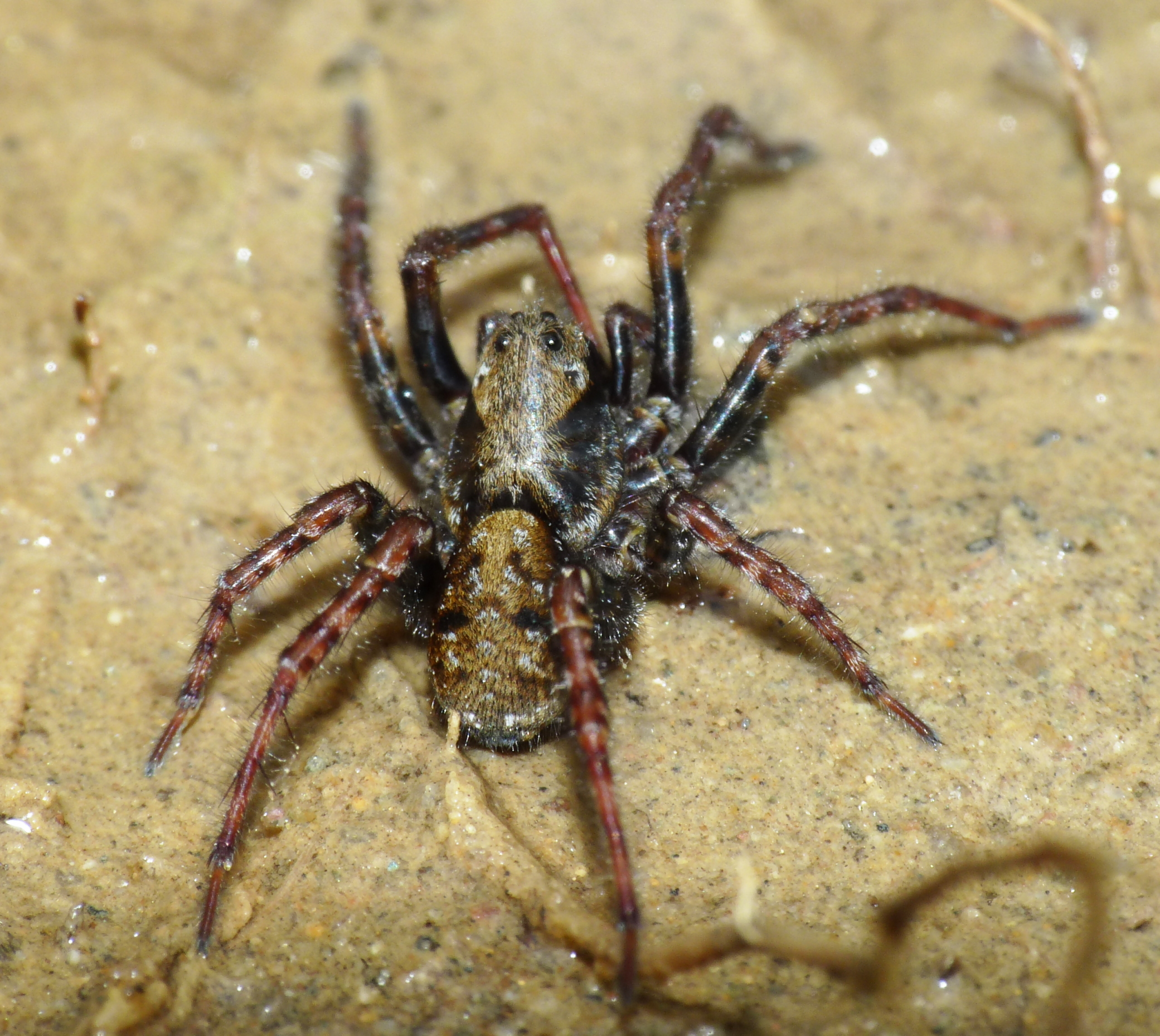
A. leopardus

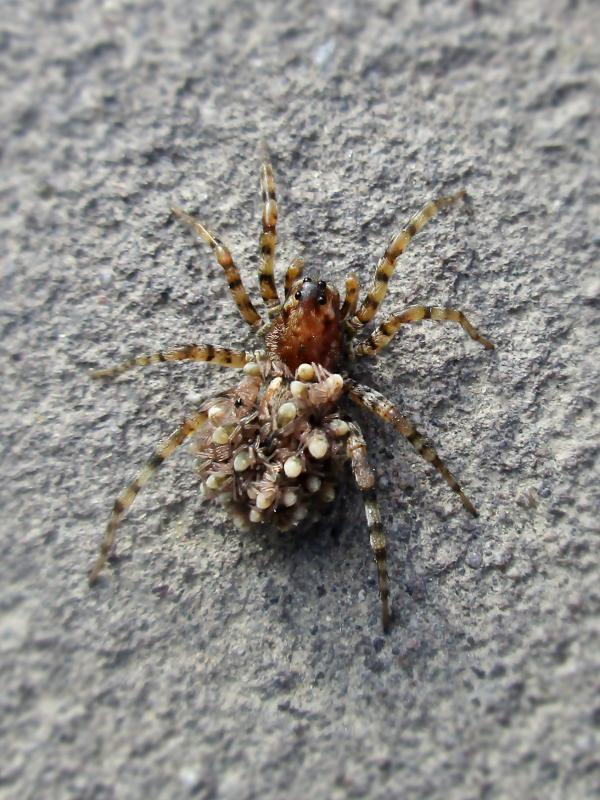
A. perita with spiderlings

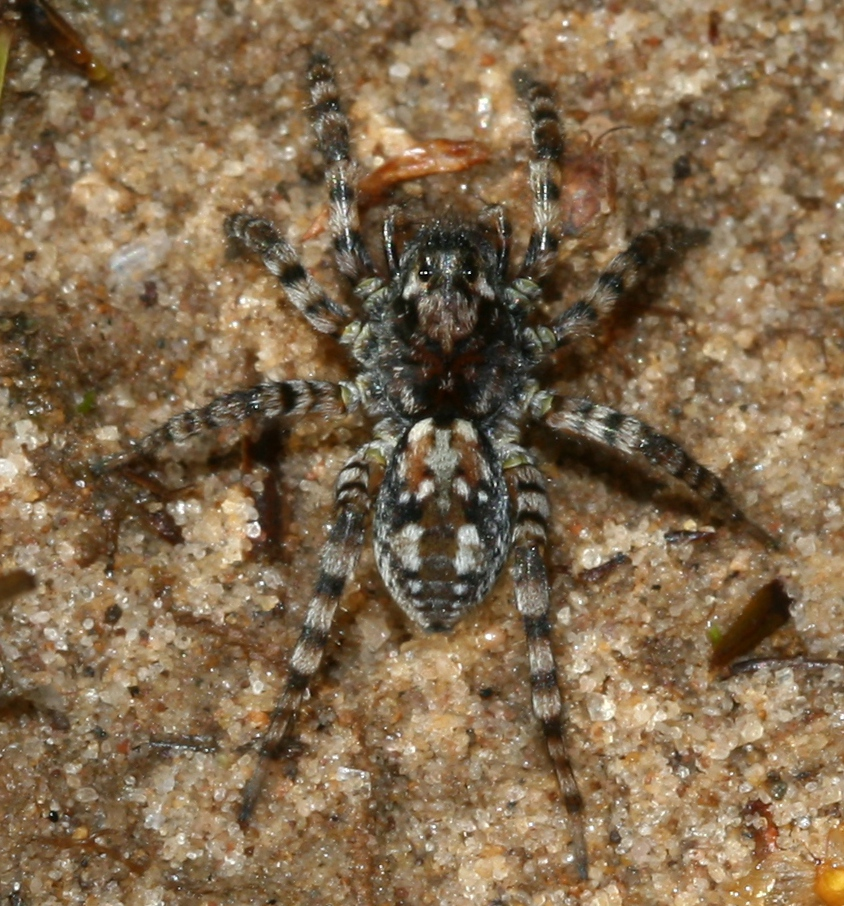
Arctosa sp.

Complete species list as of October 2025
- Arctosa albida (Simon, 1898) – South Africa
- Arctosa albopellita (L. Koch, 1875) – Ethiopia
- Arctosa algerina Roewer, 1960 – Algeria
- Arctosa aliusmodi (Karsch, 1880) – Polynesia
- Arctosa alluaudi Guy, 1966 – Morocco
- Arctosa alpigena (Doleschall, 1852) – North America, Greenland, Europe, Russia (Europe to Far East)
  - A. a. lamperti Dahl, 1908 – France, central and northern Europe, Baltic states, Romania, Russia (Europe)
- Arctosa amylaceoides (Schenkel, 1936) – China
- Arctosa annulipes (L. Koch, 1875) – Libya, Egypt, Ethiopia
- Arctosa astuta (Gerstaecker, 1873) – Central Africa
- Arctosa atriannulipes (Strand, 1906) – Ethiopia
- Arctosa ayaymama Paredes-Munguía, Brescovit & Teixeira, 2024 – Colombia, Peru
- Arctosa bacchabunda (Karsch, 1884) – São Tomé and Príncipe
- Arctosa bakva (Roewer, 1960) – Afghanistan
- Arctosa bamiana (Roewer, 1960) – Iran, Afghanistan
- Arctosa berlandi (Caporiacco, 1949) – Kenya
- Arctosa bicoloripes (Roewer, 1960) – Rwanda
- Arctosa biseriata Roewer, 1960 – DR Congo
- Arctosa brauni (Strand, 1916) – East Africa
- Arctosa brevispina (Lessert, 1915) – Tanzania, South Africa
- Arctosa camerunensis Roewer, 1960 – Cameroon
- Arctosa capensis Roewer, 1960 – South Africa
- Arctosa cervina Schenkel, 1936 – Kazakhstan, China, Japan
- Arctosa chungjooensis Paik, 1994 – Korea
- Arctosa cinerea (Fabricius, 1777) – Europe, North Africa, Congo, Caucasus, Russia (Europe to Far East), Middle East, Kazakhstan, China, Korea, Japan (type species)
- Arctosa conflicta Paredes-Munguía, Brescovit & Teixeira, 2024 – Colombia, Ecuador, Peru
- Arctosa coreana Paik, 1994 – Korea
- Arctosa costenola Paredes-Munguía, Brescovit & Teixeira, 2024 – Colombia
- Arctosa daisetsuzana (Saito, 1934) – Japan
- Arctosa darountaha Roewer, 1960 – Afghanistan
- Arctosa delaportei Omelko & Marusik, 2022 – Laos
- Arctosa denticulata Jiménez & Dondale, 1984 – Mexico
- Arctosa depectinata (Bösenberg & Strand, 1906) – Japan, China, Laos
- Arctosa depuncta (O. Pickard-Cambridge, 1876) – Libya, Egypt
- Arctosa deserta (O. Pickard-Cambridge, 1872) – Syria
- Arctosa dhikala Sankaran & Caleb, 2023 – India
- Arctosa dissonans (O. Pickard-Cambridge, 1872) – Syria, Lebanon, Israel
- Arctosa ebicha Yaginuma, 1960 – Russia (Far East), China, Korea, Japan
- Arctosa edeana Roewer, 1960 – Cameroon
- Arctosa emertoni Gertsch, 1934 – Canada, United States
- Arctosa ephippiata Roewer, 1960 – Cameroon
- Arctosa epiana (Berland, 1938) – Vanuatu
- Arctosa erythraeana Roewer, 1960 – Ethiopia
- Arctosa excellens (Simon, 1876) – Portugal, Spain
- Arctosa fessana Roewer, 1960 – Libya
- Arctosa figurata (Simon, 1876) – Europe, Caucasus
- Arctosa formosa Zamani & Marusik, 2026 – United Arab Emirates
- Arctosa frequentissima Caporiacco, 1947 – Central, East Africa
- Arctosa fulvolineata (Lucas, 1846) – Britain, Portugal, Spain, France, Italy, Slovenia, North Africa, Turkey
- Arctosa gougu Chen & Song, 1999 – China
- Arctosa hainan Wang, Li & Zhang, 2021 – China (Hainan)
- Arctosa hallasanensis Paik, 1994 – Korea
- Arctosa harraria Roewer, 1960 – Ethiopia
- Arctosa himalayensis Tikader & Malhotra, 1980 – India
- Arctosa hottentotta Roewer, 1960 – Namibia
- Arctosa hunanensis Yin, Peng & Bao, 1997 – China
- Arctosa indica Tikader & Malhotra, 1980 – India, China?
- Arctosa insignita (Thorell, 1872) – Russia (Far East), Alaska, Canada, United States, Greenland
- Arctosa intricaria (C. L. Koch, 1847) – Mediterranean
- Arctosa ipsa (Karsch, 1879) – Russia (Far East), Korea, Japan
- Arctosa janetscheki Buchar, 1976 – Nepal
- Arctosa jibarosa Paredes-Munguía, Brescovit & Teixeira, 2024 – Colombia, Ecuador, Peru
- Arctosa kadjahkaia Roewer, 1960 – Afghanistan
- Arctosa kalpiensis (Gajbe, 2004) – India
- Arctosa kansuensis (Schenkel, 1936) – China
- Arctosa kassenjea (Strand, 1913) – DR Congo
- Arctosa kawabe Tanaka, 1985 – Japan, Russia (Sakhalin), Korea?
- Arctosa kazibana Roewer, 1960 – Congo
- Arctosa keniana (Roewer, 1960) – DR Congo
- Arctosa keumjeungsana Paik, 1994 – Russia (Far East), Korea
- Arctosa khudiensis (Sinha, 1951) – India, China
- Arctosa kiangsiensis (Schenkel, 1963) – China, Laos
- Arctosa kirkiana (Strand, 1913) – Ethiopia, DR Congo, Uganda
- Arctosa kiwuana (Strand, 1913) – DR Congo
- Arctosa kolosvaryi (Caporiacco, 1947) – Ethiopia
- Arctosa labiata Tso & Chen, 2004 – Korea, Taiwan
- Arctosa laccophila (Simon, 1909) – Guinea-Bissau
- Arctosa lacupemba (Roewer, 1960) – Congo
- Arctosa lacustris (Simon, 1876) – Canary Islands, Morocco to Libya, Portugal, Spain, France, Italy, Malta
- Arctosa lagodechiensis Mcheidze, 1997 – Georgia
- Arctosa lama Dondale & Redner, 1983 – Canada, United States
- Arctosa laminata Yu & Song, 1988 – China, Japan
- Arctosa lawrencei (Roewer, 1960) – South Africa
- Arctosa leaeniformis (Simon, 1910) – Botswana
- Arctosa leopardus (Sundevall, 1833) – Europe, Turkey, Caucasus, Russia (Europe to South Siberia), Iran, Central Asia
- Arctosa lesserti Reimoser, 1934 – India
- Arctosa letourneuxi (Simon, 1885) – Morocco to Tunisia
- Arctosa lightfooti (Purcell, 1903) – South Africa
- Arctosa litigiosa Roewer, 1960 – Congo, Tanzania
- Arctosa littoralis (Hentz, 1844) – Canada to Panama
- Arctosa liujiapingensis Yin, Peng, Xie, Bao & Wang, 1997 – China
- Arctosa lutetiana (Simon, 1876) – Europe, Russia (Europe to South Siberia)
- Arctosa maculata (Hahn, 1822) – Europe, Turkey, Iran
- Arctosa marfieldi Roewer, 1960 – Cameroon
- Arctosa marocensis Roewer, 1960 – Morocco
- Arctosa meinerti (Thorell, 1875) – Algeria
- Arctosa meitanensis Yin, Wang, Xie & Peng, 1993 – Russia (South Siberia), China
- Arctosa mineira Paredes-Munguía, Brescovit & Teixeira, 2024 – Brazil
- Arctosa mittensa Yin, Wang, Xie & Peng, 1993 – China
- Arctosa mossambica Roewer, 1960 – Mozambique
- Arctosa mulani (Dyal, 1935) – Pakistan
- Arctosa niccensis (Strand, 1907) – Japan
- Arctosa nivosa (Purcell, 1903) – South Africa
- Arctosa nonsignata Roewer, 1960 – DR Congo
- Arctosa nyembeensis (Strand, 1916) – Kenya, Tanzania
- Arctosa obscura Denis, 1953 – Yemen
- Arctosa oneili (Purcell, 1903) – South Africa
- Arctosa otaviensis Roewer, 1960 – Namibia
- Arctosa pacaya Paredes-Munguía, Brescovit & Teixeira, 2024 – Peru
- Arctosa pardosina (Simon, 1898) – Uzbekistan
- Arctosa pargongensis Paik, 1994 – Korea
- Arctosa pelengea Roewer, 1960 – DR Congo
- Arctosa perita (Latreille, 1799) – Europe, North Africa, Turkey, Caucasus, Iran. Introduced to Canada
  - A. p. arenicola (Simon, 1937) – France
- Arctosa personata (L. Koch, 1872) – Portugal, Spain, France, Switzerland, Italy, Slovenia
- Arctosa pichoni Schenkel, 1963 – China
- Arctosa poecila Caporiacco, 1939 – Ethiopia
- Arctosa politana Roewer, 1960 – Ethiopia
- Arctosa promontorii (Pocock, 1900) – South Africa
- Arctosa pseudoleopardus Ponomarev, 2007 – Russia (Europe), Kazakhstan
- Arctosa pungcheunensis Paik, 1994 – Korea
- Arctosa quadripunctata (Lucas, 1846) – North Africa
- Arctosa raptor (Kulczyński, 1885) – Nepal, Russia (Kamchatka), Alaska, Canada, United States
- Arctosa ravida Ponomarev, 2007 – Russia (Caucasus), Kazakhstan
- Arctosa recurva Yu & Song, 1988 – China
- Arctosa renidescens Buchar & Thaler, 1995 – Alps (France, Italy, Switzerland, Austria)
- Arctosa ripaecola (Roewer, 1960) – Tanzania
- Arctosa rubicunda (Keyserling, 1877) – Canada, United States
- Arctosa rufescens Roewer, 1960 – Cameroon
- Arctosa sanctaerosae Gertsch & Wallace, 1935 – United States
- Arctosa sapiranga Silva & Lise, 2009 – Brazil, Argentina
- Arctosa schensiensis Schenkel, 1963 – China
- Arctosa scopulitibiis (Strand, 1906) – Ethiopia
- Arctosa serii Roth & Brown, 1976 – Mexico
- Arctosa serrulata Mao & Song, 1985 – China
- Arctosa similis Schenkel, 1938 – Canary Is. to Cyprus, Iraq, Iran
- Arctosa simoni Guy, 1966 – Turkey
- Arctosa sjostedti Roewer, 1960 – Tanzania
- Arctosa sordulenta (Thorell, 1899) – Cameroon
- Arctosa springiosa Yin, Wang, Xie & Peng, 1993 – China, Laos
- Arctosa stigmosa (Thorell, 1875) – France and Norway to Russia (West Siberia), Turkey, Iran
- Arctosa subamylacea (Bösenberg & Strand, 1906) – China, Korea, Japan
- Arctosa swatowensis (Strand, 1907) – China
- Arctosa tanakai Barrion & Litsinger, 1995 – Philippines
- Arctosa tangerana (Roewer, 1960) – Morocco
- Arctosa tangguoi Wang, Li & Zhang, 2021 – China (Hainan), Vietnam
- Arctosa tantilla Bryant, 1948 – Dominican Rep.
- Arctosa tbilisiensis Mcheidze, 1946 – Greece, Bulgaria, Turkey, Caucasus (Russia, Georgia, Azerbaijan), Iraq, Iran, Afghanistan
- Arctosa tenebrosa (Keyserling, 1877) – Colombia
- Arctosa tenella (Keyserling, 1877) – United States, Mexico, Guatemala, Costa Rica, Panama, Colombia, Ecuador, Peru, Guyana
- Arctosa tenuissima (Purcell, 1903) – South Africa
- Arctosa testacea Roewer, 1960 – Tanzania
- Arctosa togona Roewer, 1960 – Togo
- Arctosa transvaalana Roewer, 1960 – South Africa
- Arctosa tridens (Simon, 1937) – Algeria
- Arctosa tridentata Chen & Song, 1999 – China (Hainan)
- Arctosa truncata Tso & Chen, 2004 – Taiwan
- Arctosa upembana Roewer, 1960 – DR Congo
- Arctosa vaginalis Yu & Song, 1988 – China
- Arctosa variana C. L. Koch, 1847 – Mediterranean to Central Asia
- Arctosa villa Paredes-Munguía, Brescovit & Teixeira, 2024 – Peru
- Arctosa villica (Lucas, 1846) – Western Mediterranean
- Arctosa virgo (Chamberlin, 1925) – United States
- Arctosa wittei Roewer, 1960 – DR Congo, Tanzania
- Arctosa xunyangensis Wang & Qiu, 1992 – China
- Arctosa yasudai (Tanaka, 2000) – Japan, Korea
- Arctosa zhaojingzhaoi Li, 2016 – China
- Arctosa ziyunensis Yin, Peng & Bao, 1997 – China
