= Coscinida triangulifera =

Scientific classification
- Kingdom: Animalia
- Phylum: Arthropoda
- Subphylum: Chelicerata
- Class: Arachnida
- Order: Araneae
- Infraorder: Araneomorphae
- Family: Theridiidae
- Genus: Coscinida
- Species: C. triangulifera

Binomial name
- Coscinida triangulifera Simon, 1904

Species of spider

Coscinida triangulifera, is a species of spider of the genus Coscinida. It is found only in Sri Lanka and Java.
