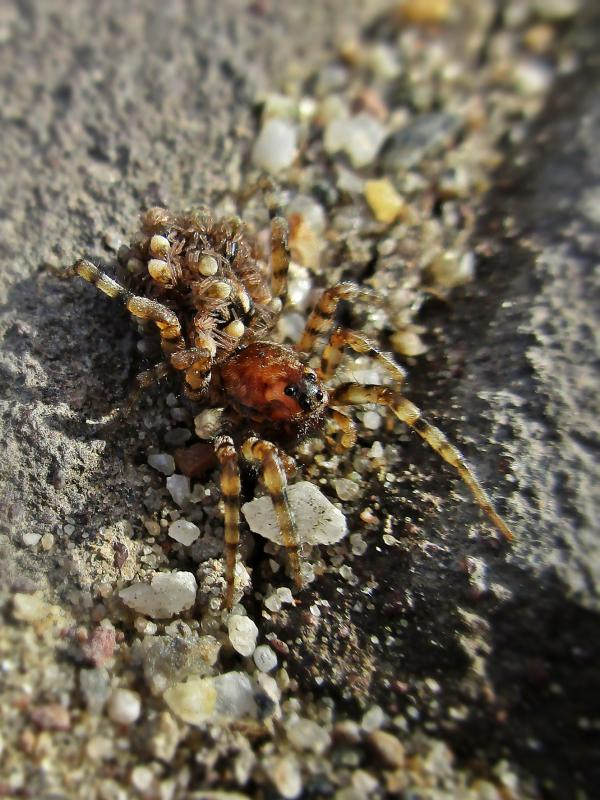

Scientific classification
- Kingdom: Animalia
- Phylum: Arthropoda
- Subphylum: Chelicerata
- Class: Arachnida
- Order: Araneae
- Infraorder: Araneomorphae
- Family: Lycosidae
- Genus: Arctosa
- Species: A. perita

Binomial name
- Arctosa perita (Latreille, 1799)

= Arctosa perita =

Species of spider

Arctosa perita, also known as the sand bear spider, is a species of wolf spider in the family Lycosidae. They are native to Europe, North Africa, Turkey, the Caucasus, and Russia, however they have also been introduced into Canada. They live on dry, sandy soils or coastal dunes, where they create their burrows.

== Description ==
Mature Arctosa perita of both sexes have a body length of 6.5–9 mm (0.26–0.35 in), although males tend to be smaller. The carapace typically ranges from brown to grey, although it can also be black. Dark streaks radiate from the fovea, and white hairs form broken lateral bands towards posterior half of the carapace. The sternum is heart-shaped, and brownish-black in colour. The abdomen is brown, and paler towards the sides. It usually has a greyish cardiac mark, which is flanked on either side by a pair of pinkish-white patches with smaller, white spots behind. The pattern is repeated on the rear of the abdomen, on either side of a pale brown median band. The legs are robust, pale, with clear dark annulations and, along with the palps, are covered in setae and spines.

The posterior eyes have small patches of white hairs to the sides and the rear, and the AME are larger than the ALE.

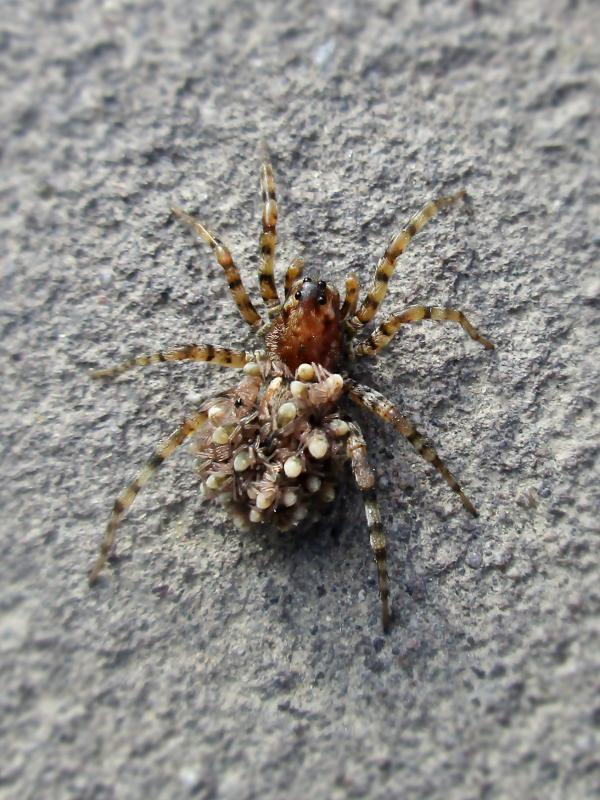

== Subspecies ==
These two subspecies belong to the species Arctosa perita:

- (Arctosa perita perita) (Latreille, 1799)
- Arctosa perita arenicola (Simon, 1937)
