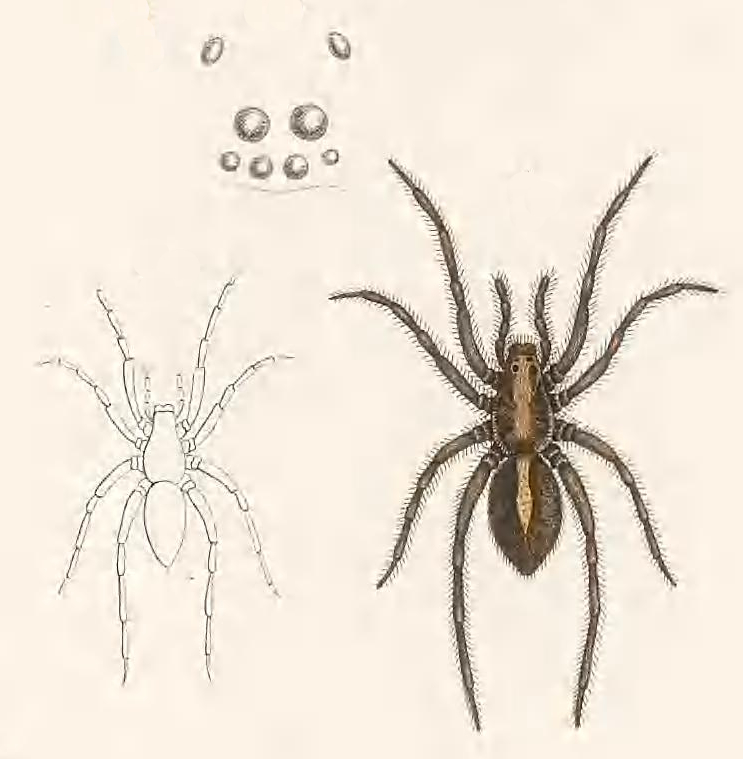

Scientific classification
- Kingdom: Animalia
- Phylum: Arthropoda
- Subphylum: Chelicerata
- Class: Arachnida
- Order: Araneae
- Infraorder: Araneomorphae
- Family: Lycosidae
- Genus: Arctosa
- Species: A. fulvolineata

Binomial name
- Arctosa fulvolineata (Lucas, 1846)

= Arctosa fulvolineata =

Species of spider

Arctosa fulvolineata is a wolf spider species in the genus Arctosa found in Europe, Mallorca and North Africa.

== Habitat ==
Saltmarsh. A. fulvolineata is found under debris and stones at the top of saltmarshes, under lumps of mud and wet, tightly matted debris along the foot of the sea wall and under stones on the wet mud on the nearby marshes.

== Distribution ==
=== UK ===
In the UK the species is mainly confined to a few saltmarshes around the Solent and in Langstone Harbour on the south coast, and from the coasts of north Kent, Essex and Suffolk. There is also a recently confirmed record from the Taw estuary in North Devon

=== Rest of Europe ===
Elsewhere in Europe it has been recorded from France, Spain, Portugal, Italy and Corsica.
