= Coscinida tibialis =

Scientific classification
- Kingdom: Animalia
- Phylum: Arthropoda
- Subphylum: Chelicerata
- Class: Arachnida
- Order: Araneae
- Infraorder: Araneomorphae
- Family: Theridiidae
- Genus: Coscinida
- Species: C. tibialis

Binomial name
- Coscinida tibialis Simon, 1895

Species of spider

Coscinida tibialis is a species of comb-footed spider in the family Theridiidae. It is found in Africa, southern Europe, the Middle East, and Central Asia. It was introduced to Thailand.
