= Arctosa tenuissima =

Suurberg Arctosa Wolf Spider

Scientific classification
- Kingdom: Animalia
- Phylum: Arthropoda
- Subphylum: Chelicerata
- Class: Arachnida
- Order: Araneae
- Infraorder: Araneomorphae
- Family: Lycosidae
- Genus: Arctosa
- Species: A. tenuissima

Binomial name
- Arctosa tenuissima (Purcell, 1903)

Synonyms
- Lycosa tenuissima Purcell, 1903; Lycorma tenuissima Roewer, 1955

Species of spider

Arctosa tenuissima is a species of spider in the family Lycosidae. It is endemic to South Africa and is commonly known as the Suurberg Arctosa wolf spider.

== Distribution ==
Arctosa tenuissima is known only from the type locality at Suurberg, Alexandria in the Eastern Cape, at an elevation of 550 m.

== Habitat ==
The species is a free-running ground dweller sampled from the Thicket biome.

== Description ==
The species is known only from the female.

The colour is reddish yellow with broad, darkly infuscate bands and strongly blackened lateral margins. The cephalic markings are united with the dark lateral bands anteriorly, and the thoracic portion of the median band is narrower.

The legs are remarkably long and slender, especially the reddish distal segments, with banded femora.

The total length is approximately 13.5 mm.

== Conservation ==
Arctosa tenuissima is listed as Data Deficient for Taxonomic reasons by the South African National Biodiversity Institute. Additional sampling is needed to collect the male and determine the species' range.

== Taxonomy ==
Arctosa tenuissima was originally described by William Frederick Purcell in 1903 as Lycosa tenuissima. Roewer transferred it to Lycorma in 1955, then to Arctosa in 1960.
