= Arctosa stigmosa =

Scientific classification
- Kingdom: Animalia
- Phylum: Arthropoda
- Subphylum: Chelicerata
- Class: Arachnida
- Order: Araneae
- Infraorder: Araneomorphae
- Family: Lycosidae
- Genus: Arctosa
- Species: A. stigmosa

Binomial name
- Arctosa stigmosa (Thorell, 1875)

Synonyms
- Trochosa stigmosa Thorell, 1875; Arctosa turbida Rosca, 1935; Arctosa stigmosa — Dahl, 1908

Species of spider

Arctosa stigmosa is a wolf spider species found in Europe (France, Norway to Ukraine) and Iran.
