= Arctosa oneili =

Oneili Arctosa Wolf Spider

Scientific classification
- Kingdom: Animalia
- Phylum: Arthropoda
- Subphylum: Chelicerata
- Class: Arachnida
- Order: Araneae
- Infraorder: Araneomorphae
- Family: Lycosidae
- Genus: Arctosa
- Species: A. oneili

Binomial name
- Arctosa oneili (Purcell, 1903)

Synonyms
- Pirata oneili Roewer, 1955

Species of spider

Arctosa oneili is a species of spider in the family Lycosidae. It is endemic to South Africa and is commonly known as the Oneili Arctosa wolf spider.

== Distribution ==
Arctosa oneili has been recorded from three Cape provinces in South Africa at elevations ranging from 66 to 925 m. All known specimens were collected prior to 1903.

== Habitat ==
Arctosa oneili is a free-running ground dweller sampled from the Fynbos, Nama Karoo, and Thicket biomes.

== Description ==
The species is known from both sexes.

The carapace is pale yellowish or reddish yellow with the surface mostly clothed with black hairs. The darker lateral bands are very lightly infuscate, while the dark marginal and light submarginal stripes are well developed.

The cephalic portion of the median band is broad and parallel-sided, containing two longitudinal, infuscate, parallel stripes. The posterior end is strongly and suddenly constricted, with the thoracic portion of the band narrow and almost parallel-sided, becoming constricted posteriorly just behind the median striae.

The abdomen is pale yellowish with some infuscate marks on the sides, and the underside lacks bands.

== Conservation ==
Arctosa oneili is listed as Data Deficient by the South African National Biodiversity Institute. Additional sampling is needed to determine the species' present range.

== Taxonomy ==
Arctosa oneili was originally described by William Frederick Purcell in 1903 as Lycosa o'neili from Dunbrody in the Eastern Cape. Roewer transferred the species to Pirata in 1955, then to Arctosa in 1960.
