= Arctosa similis =

Scientific classification
- Kingdom: Animalia
- Phylum: Arthropoda
- Subphylum: Chelicerata
- Class: Arachnida
- Order: Araneae
- Infraorder: Araneomorphae
- Family: Lycosidae
- Genus: Arctosa
- Species: A. similis

Binomial name
- Arctosa similis Schenkel, 1938

Species of spider

Arctosa similis is a wolf spider species in the genus Arctosa found in Canary Islands, Morocco, Portugal to Croatia.
