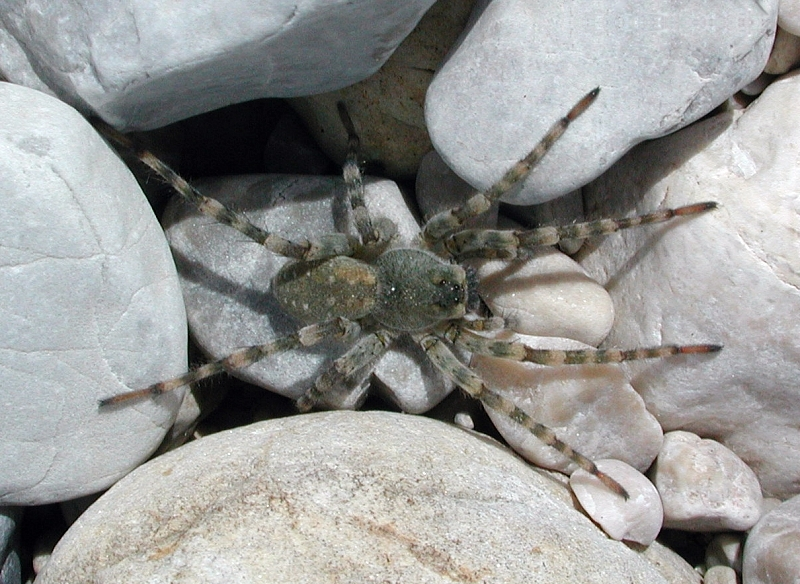

Scientific classification
- Domain: Eukaryota
- Kingdom: Animalia
- Phylum: Arthropoda
- Subphylum: Chelicerata
- Class: Arachnida
- Order: Araneae
- Infraorder: Araneomorphae
- Family: Lycosidae
- Genus: Arctosa
- Species: A. cinerea

Binomial name
- Arctosa cinerea Fabricius, 1777

Subspecies
- Arctosa cinerea obscura (Franganillo, 1913) — Spain
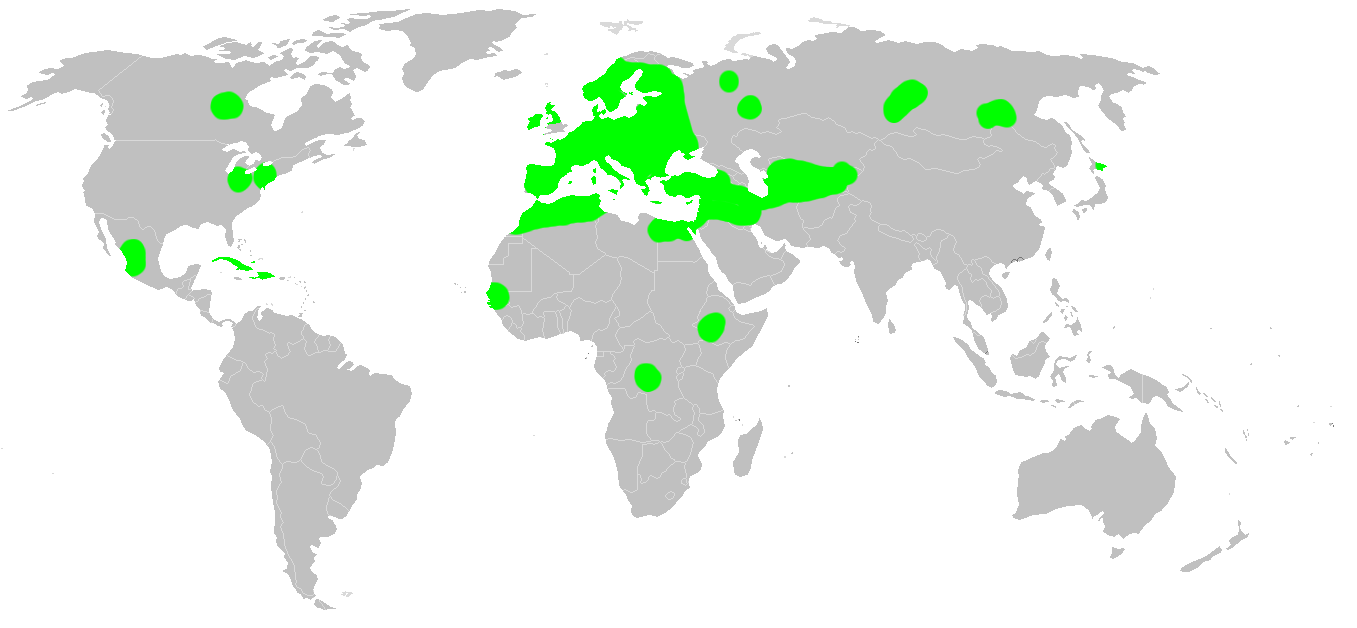

= Arctosa cinerea =

Species of spider

Arctosa cinerea is one of the most conspicuous wolf spider of central Europe, with a palearctic distribution and also found in Congo. The spider reaches a length of 17 mm (males only 14 mm), and occurs only on sandy beaches of rivers, lakes and oceans. Its grey-brown color makes for a good camouflage, and so it is not often seen, even if it wanders around during daylight. They dig holes in the ground, which they cover with silk, or hide under rocks.

== Name ==
The species name cinereus is derived from Latin cinis ash, meaning "ashen".
