= Arctosa albida =

Cape Arctosa Wolf Spider

Scientific classification
- Kingdom: Animalia
- Phylum: Arthropoda
- Subphylum: Chelicerata
- Class: Arachnida
- Order: Araneae
- Infraorder: Araneomorphae
- Family: Lycosidae
- Genus: Arctosa
- Species: A. albida

Binomial name
- Arctosa albida (Simon, 1898)

Synonyms
- Leaena albida Simon, 1898

Species of spider

Arctosa albida is a species of spider in the family Lycosidae. It is endemic to South Africa and is commonly known as the Cape Arctosa wolf spider.

== Distribution ==
Arctosa albida is known only from the Western Cape province, with the type locality given as "Capland".

== Conservation ==
Arctosa albida is listed as Data Deficient for Taxonomic reasons by the South African National Biodiversity Institute. Additional sampling is needed to collect the male and determine the species' range.

== Taxonomy ==
The species was originally described by Eugène Simon in 1898 as Leaena albida. Roewer revised the species in 1960.
