= Arctosa lightfooti =

Bergvliet Arctosa Wolf Spider

Scientific classification
- Kingdom: Animalia
- Phylum: Arthropoda
- Subphylum: Chelicerata
- Class: Arachnida
- Order: Araneae
- Infraorder: Araneomorphae
- Family: Lycosidae
- Genus: Arctosa
- Species: A. lightfooti

Binomial name
- Arctosa lightfooti (Purcell, 1903)

Synonyms
- Lycosa lightfooti Purcell, 1903

Species of spider

Arctosa lightfooti is a species of spider in the family Lycosidae. It is endemic to South Africa and is commonly known as the Bergvliet Arctosa wolf spider.

== Distribution ==
Arctosa lightfooti is known only from the Western Cape province in South Africa, where it has been recorded from several localities throughout the Cape Peninsula at elevations ranging from 9 to 125 m.

== Habitat ==
The species is a free-running ground dweller sampled from the Fynbos biome.

== Description ==
The abdomen is black with a yellowish underside, while the dorsal surface is generally paler with a median anterior stripe and three yellow spots on each side, often followed by some transverse yellow bars posteriorly.

== Conservation ==
Arctosa lightfooti is listed as Data Deficient by the South African National Biodiversity Institute. The status of the species remains obscure, and additional sampling is needed to determine the species' present range. It is protected in Table Mountain National Park and Kirstenbosch National Botanical Garden.

== Taxonomy ==
The species was described by William Frederick Purcell in 1903 as Lycosa lightfooti from Bergvliet in the Cape Peninsula.

All known specimens were collected prior to 1903.
