= Arctosa capensis =

Karoo Arctosa Wolf Spider

Scientific classification
- Kingdom: Animalia
- Phylum: Arthropoda
- Subphylum: Chelicerata
- Class: Arachnida
- Order: Araneae
- Infraorder: Araneomorphae
- Family: Lycosidae
- Genus: Arctosa
- Species: A. capensis

Binomial name
- Arctosa capensis Roewer, 1960

Species of spider

Arctosa capensis is a species of spider in the family Lycosidae. It is endemic to South Africa and is commonly known as the Karoo Arctosa wolf spider.

== Distribution ==
Arctosa capensis is known only from the type locality given as "Karroo-Steppe" in South Africa.

== Conservation ==
Arctosa capensis is listed as Data Deficient by the South African National Biodiversity Institute. Additional sampling is needed to determine the species' range, and the species requires redescription.

== Taxonomy ==
The species was described by Carl Friedrich Roewer in 1960 from the Karoo region. The holotype is housed at the Senckenberg Museum in Frankfurt am Main, Germany.
