= Arctosa nivosa =

Spotted Arctosa Wolf Spider

Scientific classification
- Kingdom: Animalia
- Phylum: Arthropoda
- Subphylum: Chelicerata
- Class: Arachnida
- Order: Araneae
- Infraorder: Araneomorphae
- Family: Lycosidae
- Genus: Arctosa
- Species: A. nivosa

Binomial name
- Arctosa nivosa (Purcell, 1903)

Synonyms
- Lycosa nivosa Purcell, 1903

Species of spider

Arctosa nivosa is a species of spider in the family Lycosidae. It is endemic to South Africa and is commonly known as the spotted Arctosa wolf spider.

== Distribution ==
Arctosa nivosa has been recorded from the provinces Eastern Cape, Northern Cape and Western Cape in South Africa at elevations ranging from 37 to 1531 m.

== Habitat ==
The species is a free-running ground dweller sampled from the Fynbos and Thicket biomes.

== Description ==
The species is known from both sexes, though only the female epigyne has been illustrated.

The carapace is pale yellow below or at least paler, while the sides and dorsal surface are black. The dorsal surface has a median yellowish mark on the anterior half flanked by yellow spots on each side, with sometimes almost the whole dorsal surface broadly yellowish.

The sides and dorsal surface are covered with numerous snow-white spots and patches.

== Conservation ==
Arctosa nivosa is listed as Least Concern by the South African National Biodiversity Institute due to its wide geographic range. The species is protected in Tsolwana Nature Reserve and Asante Sana Private Game Reserve.

== Taxonomy ==
The species was originally described by William Frederick Purcell in 1903 as Lycosa nivosa from Retreat Flats in the Cape Peninsula. Roewer revised the species in 1960.
