= Arctosa transvaalana =

Transvaal Arctosa Wolf Spider

Scientific classification
- Kingdom: Animalia
- Phylum: Arthropoda
- Subphylum: Chelicerata
- Class: Arachnida
- Order: Araneae
- Infraorder: Araneomorphae
- Family: Lycosidae
- Genus: Arctosa
- Species: A. transvaalana

Binomial name
- Arctosa transvaalana Roewer, 1960

Species of spider

Arctosa transvaalana is a species of spider in the family Lycosidae. It is endemic to South Africa and is commonly known as the Transvaal Arctosa wolf spider.

== Distribution ==
Arctosa transvaalana is known from Limpopo province in South Africa, with the type locality given as Crocodile River, Transvaal, at an elevation of 1486 m.

== Habitat ==
The species is a free-running ground dweller sampled from the Savanna biome.

== Description ==
The species is known only from the male.

The carapace is rust-red, finely and uniformly hairy, with a submarginal row of four fuzzy, light yellow spots and no actual median band, but appears star-shaped light yellow around the striae. The eye field is black, while the clypeus is rust-red.

The abdomen dorsally is rusty yellow, lighter than the cephalothorax, with blackish fuzzy scratches laterally and a short, square, dark brown spot anterior-medially. From the posterior corner of this spot, two parallel rows of eight black spots each extend almost to the rear end.

The dorsal abdomen is evenly covered with mixed brown and whitish hairs. Ventrally, the sternum and coxae are monochrome pale yellow, with other leg segments pale yellow except the femora, which each bear two fuzzy black spots dorsally.

== Conservation ==
Arctosa transvaalana is listed as Data Deficient for Taxonomic reasons by the South African National Biodiversity Institute. Additional sampling is needed to collect the female and determine the species' range. The species is protected in Kruger National Park.

== Taxonomy ==
The species was described by Carl Friedrich Roewer in 1960 from the Crocodile River area. The holotype is housed at the Senckenberg Museum in Frankfurt am Main, Germany.
