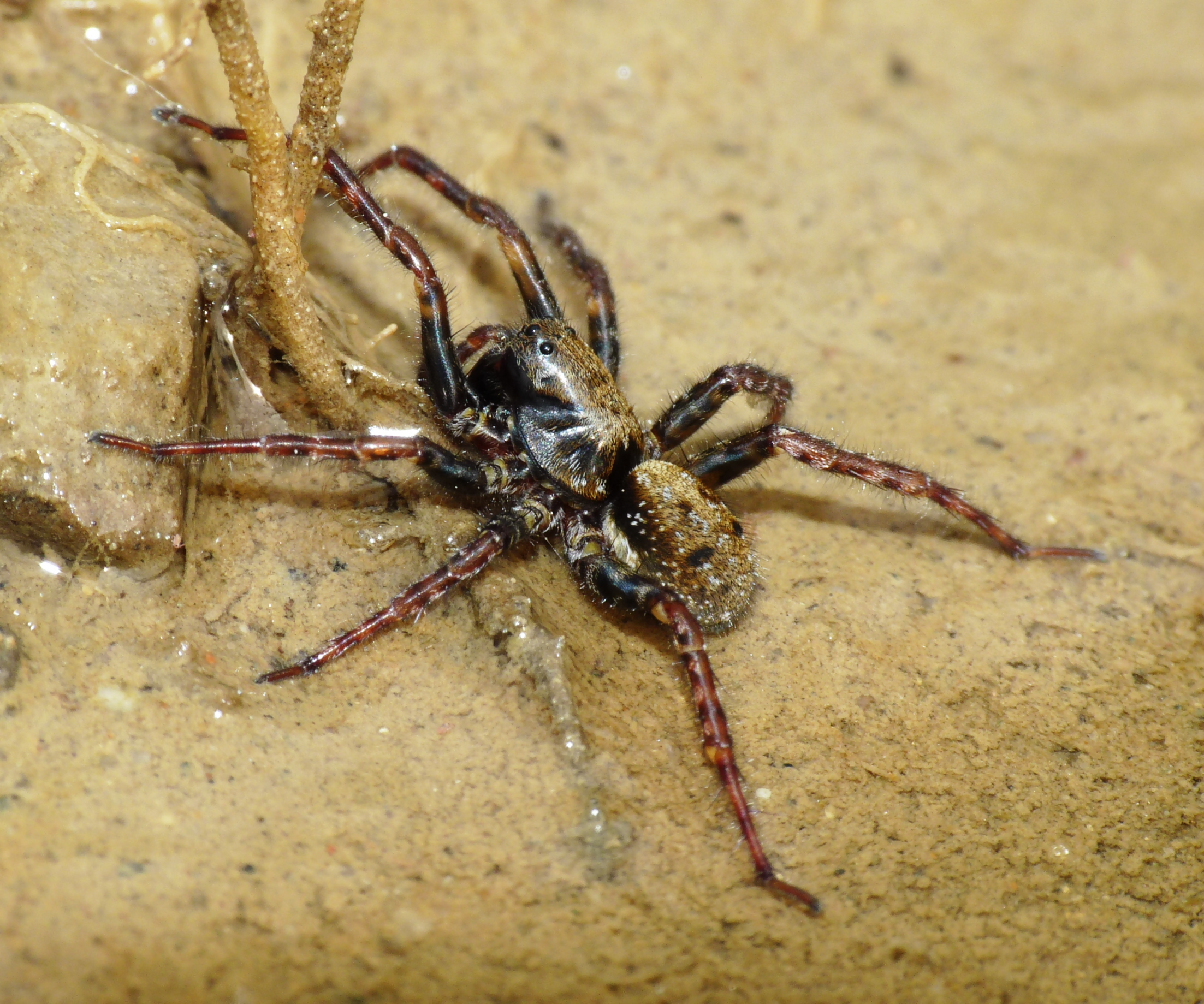

Scientific classification
- Domain: Eukaryota
- Kingdom: Animalia
- Phylum: Arthropoda
- Subphylum: Chelicerata
- Class: Arachnida
- Order: Araneae
- Infraorder: Araneomorphae
- Family: Lycosidae
- Genus: Arctosa
- Species: A. leopardus

Binomial name
- Arctosa leopardus (Sundevall, 1833)

= Arctosa leopardus =

Species of spider

Arctosa leopardus is a species of spiders belonging to the family Lycosidae that are native to Europe.
