= Agelena jirisanensis =

Scientific classification
- Kingdom: Animalia
- Phylum: Arthropoda
- Subphylum: Chelicerata
- Class: Arachnida
- Order: Araneae
- Infraorder: Araneomorphae
- Family: Agelenidae
- Genus: Agelena
- Species: A. jirisanensis

Binomial name
- Agelena jirisanensis Paik, 1965

Species of spider

Agelena jirisanensis is a species of spider in the family Agelenidae. It was first described by Paik Kap Yong in 1965 and is endemic to Korea, where it is found in the foothills of Jirisan, and whence comes its species epithet, jirisanensis.

It builds small funnel-shaped webs between low trees.
