= Arctosa excellens =

Scientific classification
- Kingdom: Animalia
- Phylum: Arthropoda
- Subphylum: Chelicerata
- Class: Arachnida
- Order: Araneae
- Infraorder: Araneomorphae
- Family: Lycosidae
- Genus: Arctosa
- Species: A. excellens

Binomial name
- Arctosa excellens (Simon, 1876)

Species of spider

Arctosa excellens is a wolf spider species found in Portugal and Spain.
