= Arctosa virgo =

Scientific classification
- Kingdom: Animalia
- Phylum: Arthropoda
- Subphylum: Chelicerata
- Class: Arachnida
- Order: Araneae
- Infraorder: Araneomorphae
- Family: Lycosidae
- Genus: Arctosa
- Species: A. virgo

Binomial name
- Arctosa virgo (Chamberlin, 1925)

Species of spider

Arctosa virgo is a species of wolf spider in the family Lycosidae. It is found in the United States.
