= Kuncosa =

Scientific classification
- Kingdom: Animalia
- Phylum: Arthropoda
- Subphylum: Chelicerata
- Class: Arachnida
- Order: Araneae
- Infraorder: Araneomorphae
- Family: Lycosidae
- Genus: Kuncosa; Wang, Marusik & Zhang, 2025

Type species
- Arctosa ningboensis Yin, Bao & Zhang, 1996

Species
- 5, see text

Genus of spiders

Kuncosa is a genus of spiders in the wolf spider family Lycosidae.

== Distribution ==
Kuncosa occurs in East Asia, with species distributed across China, Japan, and Korea.

== Etymology ==
The genus name is a combination of the ancient mythical fish creature Kun 鲲; kūn and the common wolf spider genus ending "-cosa".

== Species ==
As of January 2026, this genus includes five species:

- Kuncosa fujiii (Tanaka, 1985) – Japan
- Kuncosa hikosanensis (Tanaka, 1985) – Japan
- Kuncosa kwangreungensis (Paik & Tanaka, 1986) – Korea
- Kuncosa ningboensis (Yin, Bao & Zhang, 1996) – China
- Kuncosa zhui (Yu & Song, 1988) – China
