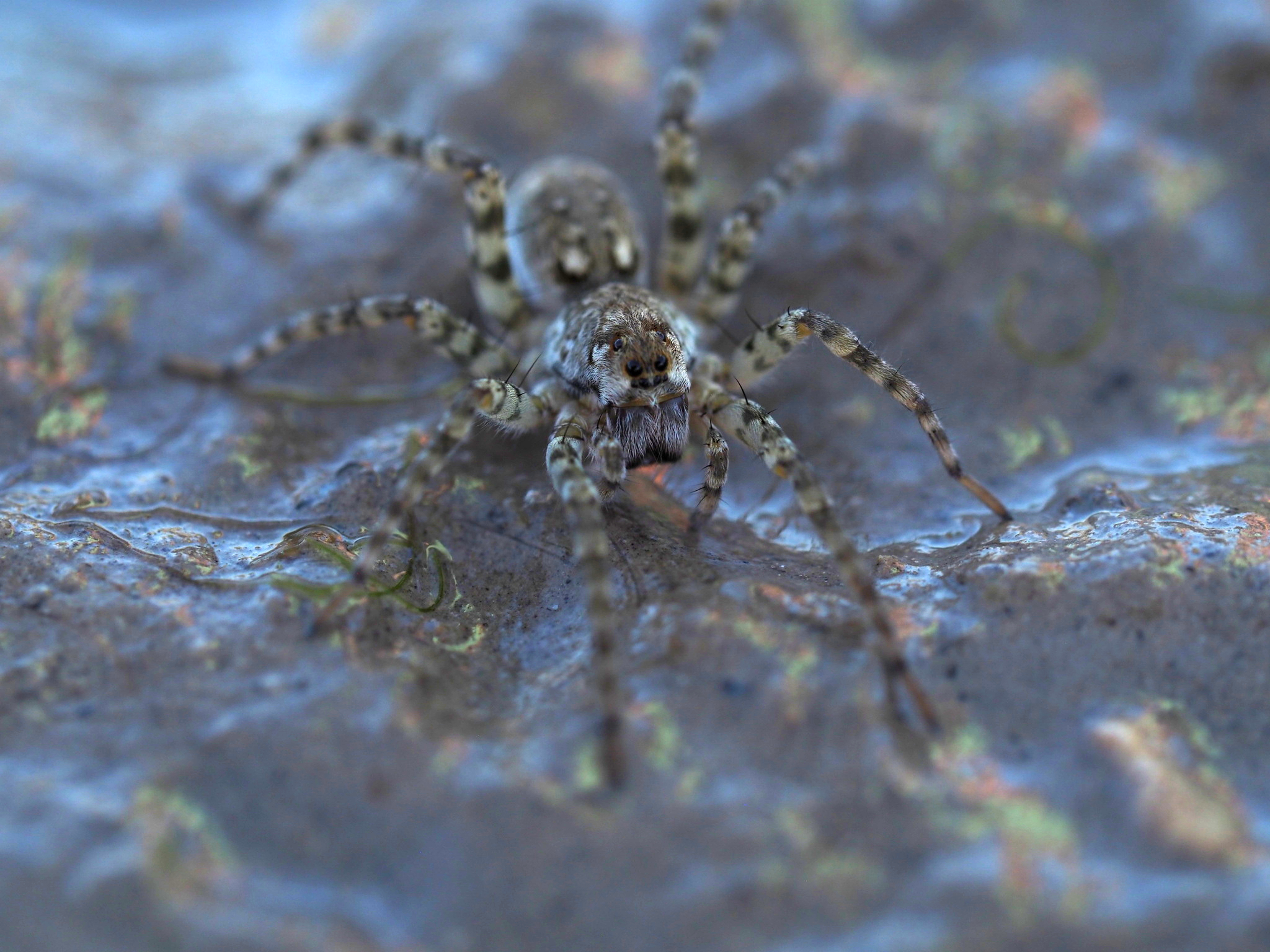

Conservation status
- Secure (NatureServe)

Scientific classification
- Kingdom: Animalia
- Phylum: Arthropoda
- Subphylum: Chelicerata
- Class: Arachnida
- Order: Araneae
- Infraorder: Araneomorphae
- Family: Lycosidae
- Genus: Arctosa
- Species: A. littoralis

Binomial name
- Arctosa littoralis (Hentz, 1844)

= Arctosa littoralis =

Species of spider

Arctosa littoralis, the beach wolf spider, is a species of wolf spider in the family Lycosidae.

== Description ==
These spiders have mottled white, gray, or brown bodies that enable them to camouflage against sand. Females tend to be slightly larger, with an average body length (excluding legs) of 11.2 to 14.7 mm, compared to 9.6 to 12.8 mm for males.

== Habitat and distribution ==
A. littoralis is found in sandy substrates within scrub habitats, grass-shrub associations, seashores, riverbanks, and lakes across North and Central America.

== Behavior ==
They are active during both daylight and nighttime hours. Females typically store their egg sacs under rocks or within burrows, which they can construct by bonding grains of sand together with their silk. Once they hatch, the spiderlings are carried on their mother's back until they molt and disperse. Like other wolf spiders, A. littoralis chases and attacks prey and does not spin webs.
