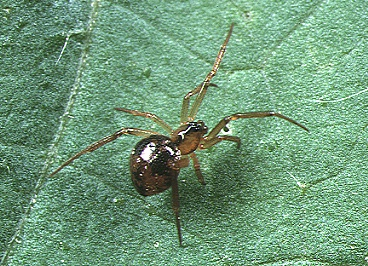

Scientific classification
- Kingdom: Animalia
- Phylum: Arthropoda
- Subphylum: Chelicerata
- Class: Arachnida
- Order: Araneae
- Infraorder: Araneomorphae
- Family: Theridiidae
- Genus: Coscinida
- Species: C. japonica

Binomial name
- Coscinida japonica Yoshida, 1994

= Coscinida japonica =

Species of spider

Coscinida japonica is a species of comb-footed spider in the family Theridiidae. It is found in Japan.
