= Arctosa brevispina =

Tanzania Arctosa Wolf Spider

Scientific classification
- Kingdom: Animalia
- Phylum: Arthropoda
- Subphylum: Chelicerata
- Class: Arachnida
- Order: Araneae
- Infraorder: Araneomorphae
- Family: Lycosidae
- Genus: Arctosa
- Species: A. brevispina

Binomial name
- Arctosa brevispina (Lessert, 1915)

Synonyms
- Lycosa brevispina Lessert, 1915

Species of spider

Arctosa brevispina is a species of spider in the family Lycosidae. It is found in Tanzania and South Africa, and is commonly known as the Tanzania Arctosa wolf spider.

== Distribution ==
Arctosa brevispina has been recorded from Tanzania and South Africa.

In South Africa, the species has been collected from KwaZulu-Natal and Limpopo at elevations ranging from 51 to 1127 m.

It is possibly under-collected and is suspected to occur in additional countries between Tanzania and South Africa.

== Habitat ==
The species is a free-running ground dweller sampled from the Savanna biome.

== Conservation ==
Arctosa brevispina is listed as Least Concern by the South African National Biodiversity Institute due to its wide geographic range. It is protected in Kosi Bay Nature Reserve.

== Taxonomy ==
Arctosa brevispina was originally described by Roger de Lessert in 1915 as Lycosa brevispina from Tanzania. The male was described by Lessert in 1926. Roewer revised the species in 1960.
