= Arctosa tbilisiensis =

Scientific classification
- Kingdom: Animalia
- Phylum: Arthropoda
- Subphylum: Chelicerata
- Class: Arachnida
- Order: Araneae
- Infraorder: Araneomorphae
- Family: Lycosidae
- Genus: Arctosa
- Species: A. tbilisiensis

Binomial name
- Arctosa tbilisiensis Mcheidze, 1946

Species of spider

Arctosa tbilisiensis is a wolf spider species in the genus Arctosa found in Europe (Bulgaria, Greece to Georgia).
