= Arctosa lawrencei =

Lawrence Arctosa Wolf Spider

Scientific classification
- Kingdom: Animalia
- Phylum: Arthropoda
- Subphylum: Chelicerata
- Class: Arachnida
- Order: Araneae
- Infraorder: Araneomorphae
- Family: Lycosidae
- Genus: Arctosa
- Species: A. lawrencei

Binomial name
- Arctosa lawrencei (Roewer, 1960)

Synonyms
- Piratosa lawrencei Roewer, 1960

Species of spider

Arctosa lawrencei is a species of spider in the family Lycosidae. It is endemic to South Africa and is commonly known as the Lawrence Arctosa wolf spider.

== Distribution ==
Arctosa lawrencei is known only from Capland (Karoo region) in South Africa.

== Conservation ==
Arctosa lawrencei is listed as Data Deficient for Taxonomic and unknown provenance reasons by the South African National Biodiversity Institute. The status of the species remains obscure, and additional sampling is needed to determine the species' range.

== Etymology ==
The species is named after Reginald Frederick Lawrence, a South African arachnologist who made significant contributions to the study of southern African spiders.

== Taxonomy ==
The species was originally described by Carl Friedrich Roewer in 1960 as Piratosa lawrencei with the type locality given as Capland (Karroo). Marusik and colleagues transferred the species to Arctosa in 2010 based on the resemblance of the genitalia to that of Arctosa. The holotype is housed at the Senckenberg Museum in Frankfurt am Main, Germany.
