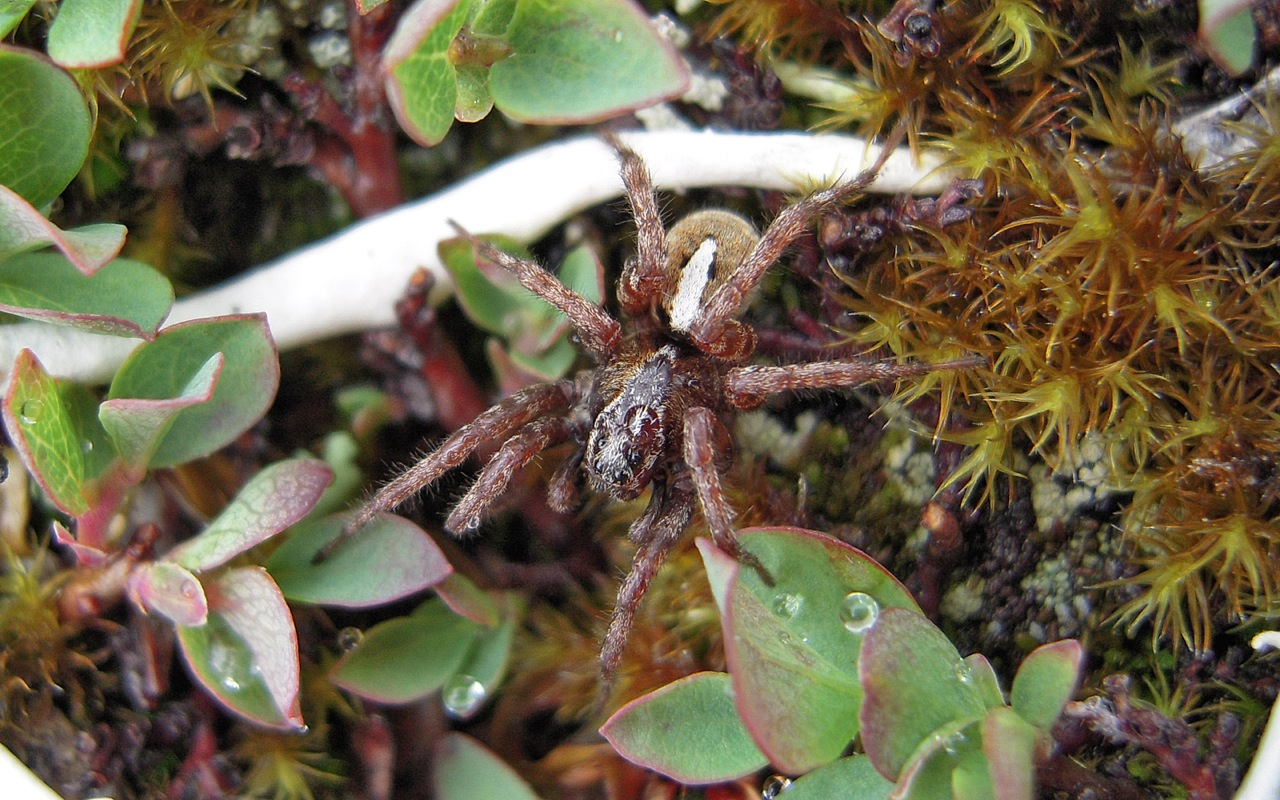

Conservation status
- Secure (NatureServe)

Scientific classification
- Kingdom: Animalia
- Phylum: Arthropoda
- Subphylum: Chelicerata
- Class: Arachnida
- Order: Araneae
- Infraorder: Araneomorphae
- Family: Lycosidae
- Genus: Arctosa
- Species: A. alpigena

Binomial name
- Arctosa alpigena (Doleschall, 1852)

Subspecies
- Arctosa alpigena lamperti Dahl, 1908 — Central, Eastern Europe

= Arctosa alpigena =

Species of spider

Arctosa alpigena is a wolf spider species in the family Lycosidae with a holarctic distribution.
