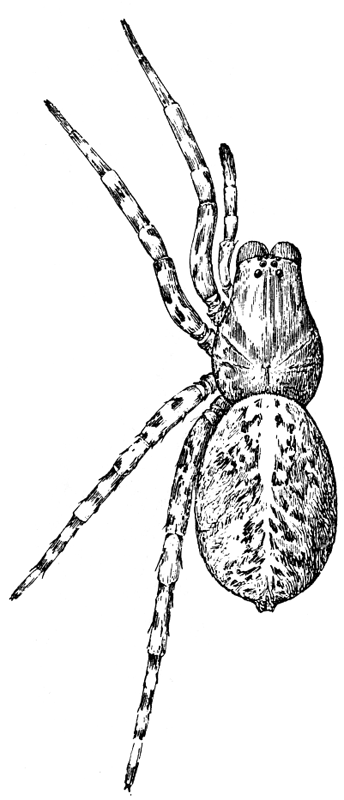

Conservation status
- Secure (NatureServe)

Scientific classification
- Kingdom: Animalia
- Phylum: Arthropoda
- Subphylum: Chelicerata
- Class: Arachnida
- Order: Araneae
- Infraorder: Araneomorphae
- Family: Lycosidae
- Genus: Arctosa
- Species: A. rubicunda

Binomial name
- Arctosa rubicunda (Keyserling, 1877)

= Arctosa rubicunda =

Species of spider

Arctosa rubicunda is a species of wolf spider in the family Lycosidae. It is found in the USA and Canada.
