= Coscinida shimenensis =

Scientific classification
- Domain: Eukaryota
- Kingdom: Animalia
- Phylum: Arthropoda
- Subphylum: Chelicerata
- Class: Arachnida
- Order: Araneae
- Infraorder: Araneomorphae
- Family: Theridiidae
- Genus: Coscinida
- Species: C. shimenensis

Binomial name
- Coscinida shimenensis Yin, Peng & Bao, 2006

Species of spider

Coscinida shimenensis is a species of comb-footed spider in the family Theridiidae. It is found in China.
