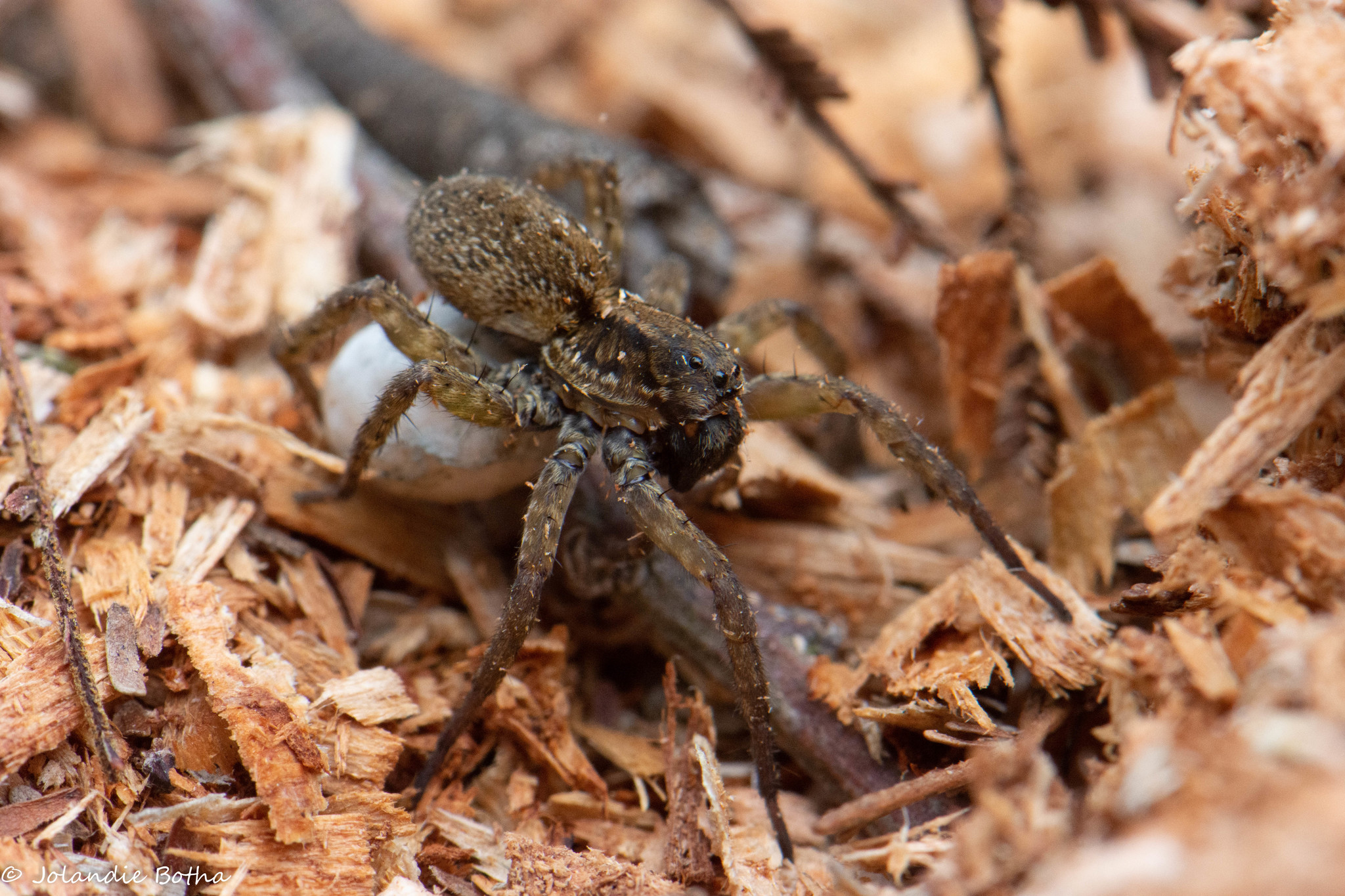
- female with egg sac
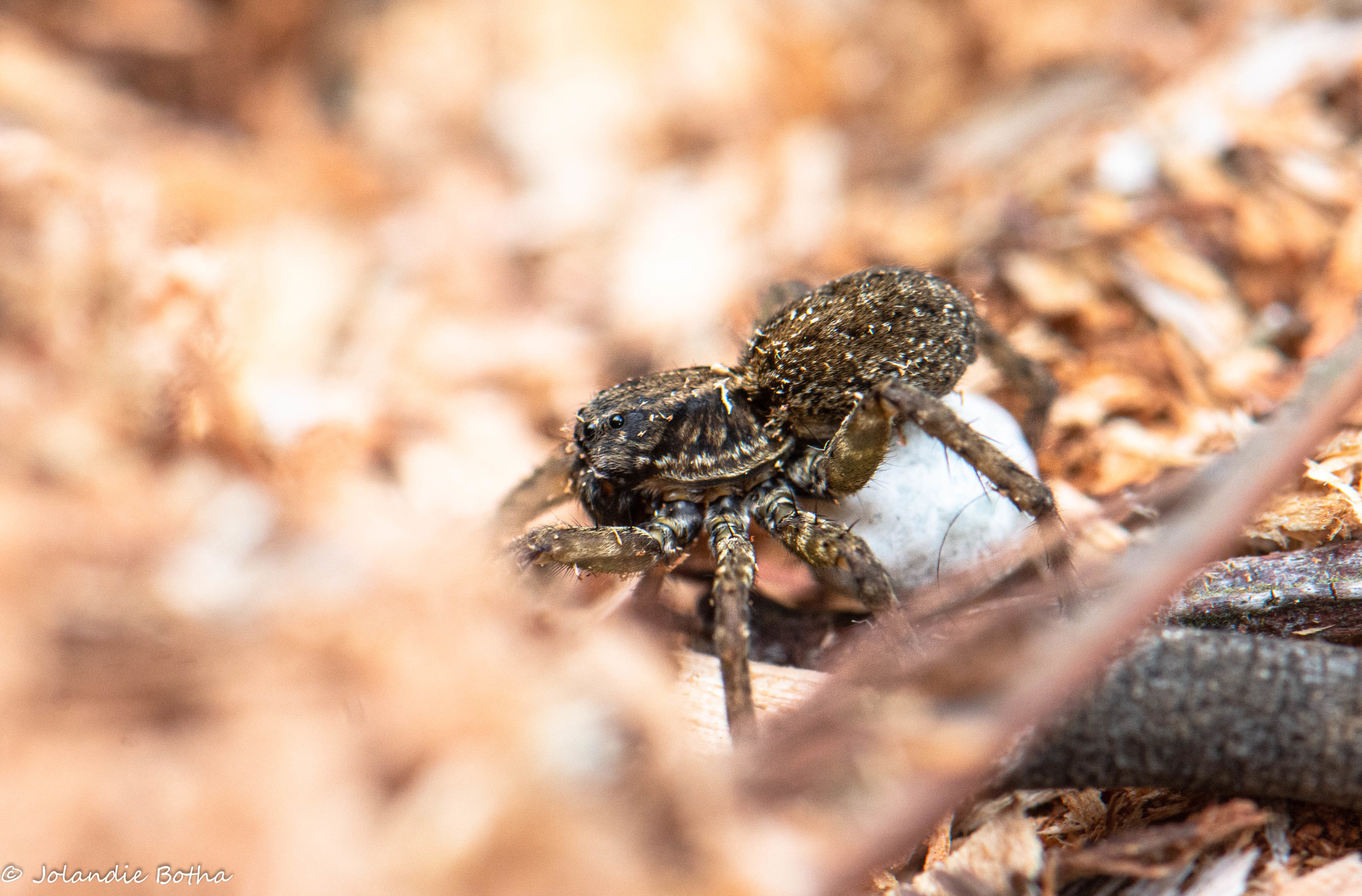
- female with egg sac

Scientific classification
- Kingdom: Animalia
- Phylum: Arthropoda
- Subphylum: Chelicerata
- Class: Arachnida
- Order: Araneae
- Infraorder: Araneomorphae
- Family: Lycosidae
- Genus: Arctosa
- Species: A. promontorii

Binomial name
- Arctosa promontorii (Pocock, 1900)

Synonyms
- Lycosa promontorii Pocock, 1900; Tarentula promontorii Strand, 1907

= Arctosa promontorii =

Table Mountain Arctosa Wolf Spider

Species of spider

Arctosa promontorii is a species of spider in the family Lycosidae. It is endemic to South Africa and is commonly known as the Table Mountain Arctosa wolf spider.

== Distribution ==
Arctosa promontorii has been recorded from three provinces in South Africa at elevations ranging from 9 to 1399 m. The species is known from six protected areas.

== Habitat ==
The species is a free-running ground dweller sampled from the Grassland and Fynbos biomes, as well as from vineyards.

== Description ==
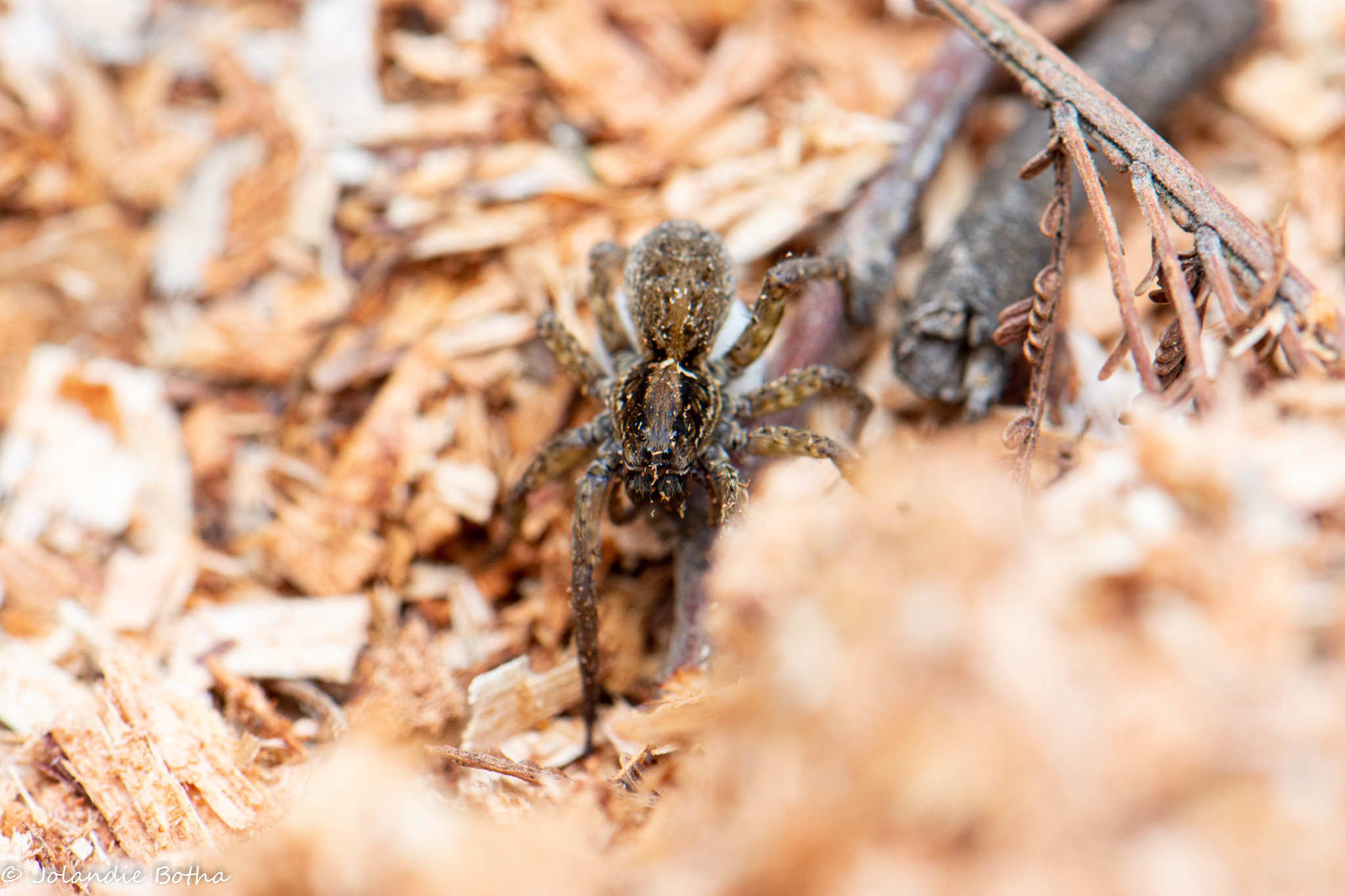
female with egg sac

Arctosa promontorii is known only from the female, though a male has been collected but not yet described.

Females are dark in colour with a carapace bearing a narrow white submarginal stripe. The abdomen is dark reddish grey above and mottled black, marked with a short paler median stripe anteriorly. The abdomen is entirely black below, with the coxae and sternum deep blackish brown.

The legs are mottled with dark and paler spots, and the chelicerae are scantily clothed with yellow setae.

The total length is approximately 13 mm.

== Conservation ==
Arctosa promontorii is listed as Least Concern by the South African National Biodiversity Institute. Although the species is currently known only from one sex, it has a wide geographical range. It has been recorded from six protected areas.

== Taxonomy ==
The species was originally described by Reginald Innes Pocock in 1900 as Lycosa promontorii from Wynberg Caves in Table Mountain National Park. Roewer revised the species in 1960.
