= Shiragaia =

Scientific classification
- Kingdom: Animalia
- Phylum: Arthropoda
- Subphylum: Chelicerata
- Class: Arachnida
- Order: Araneae
- Infraorder: Araneomorphae
- Family: Gnaphosidae
- Genus: Shiragaia; Paik, 1992
- Species: S. taeguensis

Binomial name
- Shiragaia taeguensis Paik, 1992

Genus of spiders

Shiragaia is a monotypic genus of Asian ground spiders containing the single species, Shiragaia taeguensis. It was first described by Paik Kap Yong in 1992, and has only been found in Korea. The specimen described by Paik was found in Daegu, whence the species epithet, taeguensis.
