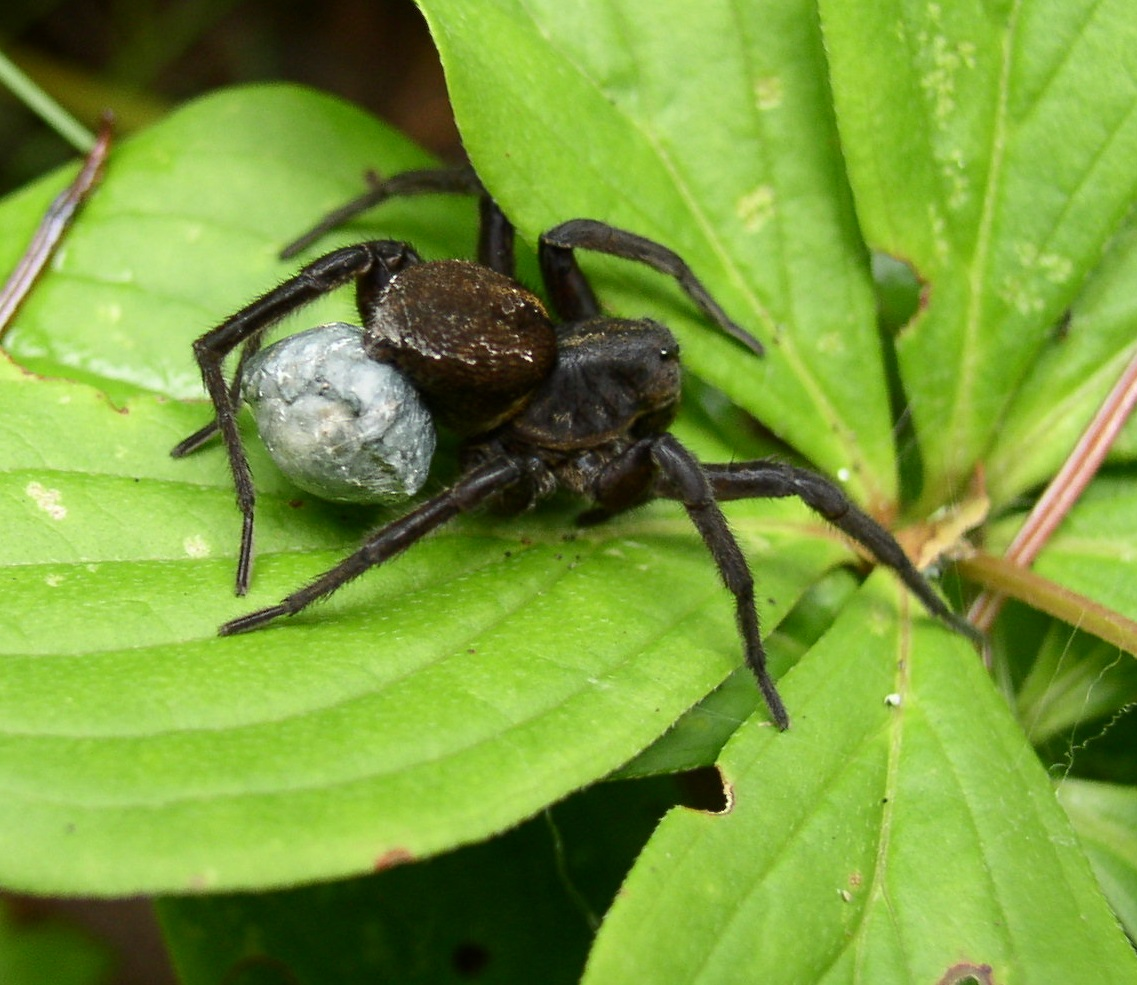
- Female with egg sac

Conservation status
- Secure (NatureServe)

Scientific classification
- Kingdom: Animalia
- Phylum: Arthropoda
- Subphylum: Chelicerata
- Class: Arachnida
- Order: Araneae
- Infraorder: Araneomorphae
- Family: Lycosidae
- Genus: Arctosa
- Species: A. raptor

Binomial name
- Arctosa raptor (Kulczynski, 1885)

= Arctosa raptor =

Species of spider

Arctosa raptor is a species of wolf spider in the family Lycosidae. It is found in Russia, Nepal, the USA, and Canada.
