= Coscinida novemnotata =

Scientific classification
- Kingdom: Animalia
- Phylum: Arthropoda
- Subphylum: Chelicerata
- Class: Arachnida
- Order: Araneae
- Infraorder: Araneomorphae
- Family: Theridiidae
- Genus: Coscinida
- Species: C. novemnotata

Binomial name
- Coscinida novemnotata Simon, 1895

Species of spider

Coscinida novemnotata, is a species of spider of the genus Coscinida. It is endemic to Sri Lanka.
