= Arctosa figurata =

Scientific classification
- Kingdom: Animalia
- Phylum: Arthropoda
- Subphylum: Chelicerata
- Class: Arachnida
- Order: Araneae
- Infraorder: Araneomorphae
- Family: Lycosidae
- Genus: Arctosa
- Species: A. figurata

Binomial name
- Arctosa figurata (Simon, 1876)

Species of spider

Arctosa is a wolf spider species found in Europe and Russia.
