= Stemmops =

Stemmops Temporal range: Neogene– Present
- male S. questa

Scientific classification
- Kingdom: Animalia
- Phylum: Arthropoda
- Subphylum: Chelicerata
- Class: Arachnida
- Order: Araneae
- Infraorder: Araneomorphae
- Family: Theridiidae
- Genus: Stemmops; O. Pickard-Cambridge, 1894

Type species
- S. bicolor O. Pickard-Cambridge, 1894

Species
- 27, see text

Genus of spiders

Stemmops is a genus of comb-footed spiders that was first described by Octavius Pickard-Cambridge in 1894.

== Species ==
As of June 2020 it contains twenty-seven species, found mostly in the Americas, though several species occur in east Asia:

- Stemmops belavista Marques & Buckup, 1996 – Brazil
- Stemmops bicolor O. Pickard-Cambridge, 1894 (type) – USA to Panama, Cuba, Bahama Is.
- Stemmops cambridgei Levi, 1955 – Mexico, Honduras
- Stemmops carajas Santanna & Rodrigues, 2018 – Brazil
- Stemmops caranavi Marques & Buckup, 1996 – Bolivia
- Stemmops carauari Santanna & Rodrigues, 2018 – Brazil
- Stemmops carius Marques & Buckup, 1996 – Brazil
- Stemmops concolor Simon, 1898 – St. Vincent
- Stemmops cryptus Levi, 1955 – Panama
- Stemmops forcipus Zhu, 1998 – China, Laos
- Stemmops guapiacu Santanna & Rodrigues, 2018 – Brazil
- Stemmops lina Levi, 1955 – Mexico
- Stemmops mellus Levi, 1964 – Panama
- Stemmops murici Santanna & Rodrigues, 2018 – Brazil
- Stemmops nigrabdomenus Zhu, 1998 – China, Laos
- Stemmops nipponicus Yaginuma, 1969 – Russia (Far East), China, Korea, Japan
- Stemmops ornatus (Bryant, 1933) – USA
- Stemmops orsus Levi, 1964 – Panama, Brazil
- Stemmops osorno (Levi, 1963) – Chile
- Stemmops pains Santanna & Rodrigues, 2018 – Brazil
- Stemmops questus Levi, 1955 – Mexico to Venezuela
- Stemmops salenas Marques & Buckup, 1996 – Brazil
- Stemmops satpudaensis Rajoria, 2015 – India
- Stemmops servus Levi, 1964 – Panama, Brazil
- Stemmops subtilis (Simon, 1895) – Venezuela
- Stemmops vicosa Levi, 1964 – Brazil
- Stemmops victoria Levi, 1955 – Mexico

In synonymy:

- S. darlingtoni Bryant, 1940 = Stemmops bicolor O. Pickard-Cambridge, 1894
- S. orniceps (Chamberlin & Ivie, 1944) = Stemmops ornatus (Bryant, 1933)
