= Paik Kap Yong =

South Korean arachnologist (1914–1996)

Paik Kap Yong (Korean: 백갑용, 1914 - 1996) was a South Korean arachnologist.

== Life ==
He was born in Daegu, Korea, Empire of Japan in 1914, and had his secondary schooling in Daegu and then in Kyoto, Japan. In 1941, he became a graduate of the Department of Agriculture at Miyazaki High School of Agriculture and Forestry in Japan.

On his return to Korea in 1941, he worked first at the Entomology Department at the Suwon Agricultural Research Institute, and then as a secondary school teacher. In 1945 he became an assistant professor at Suwon Agricultural College, which was followed in 1946 by working as a technician in the Pathology Entomology Department at the Suwon Central Agricultural Research and Extension Services.

In 1948 he was diagnosed with tuberculosis. After spending about 10 years recovering, he became a lecturer at the Department of Science Education at Kyungpook National University's College of Education in January 1957, where he remained for the rest of his working life, teaching new zoologists and taxonomists, and receiving many awards for his work.

in 1964, he received a Ph.D. in science from Kyungpook National University.

His zoological author name is "Paik".

== Some taxa authored ==
- Agelena jirisanensis Paik, 1965
- Shiragaia Paik, 1992
- Category:Taxa named by Paik Kap Yong
