= C. varia =

C. varia may refer to:

- Chlamys varia, the variegated scallop, a small scallop species
- Codophila varia, an insect species
- Conyza varia, a species of aster flowers found in Cape Verde

== See also ==
- Varia (disambiguation)
