= Staria =

Staria may refer to:

- Hyundai Staria, model of motor vehicle
- Staria (bug), a genus of insects in the family Pentatomidae
- Staria Oyj, a Finnish company
