= Cephaloplatus =

Scientific classification
- Kingdom: Animalia
- Phylum: Arthropoda
- Class: Insecta
- Order: Hemiptera
- Suborder: Heteroptera
- Family: Pentatomidae
- Tribe: Carpocorini
- Genus: Cephaloplatus; White, 1842

Subgenera
- Cephaloplatus (Cephaloplatus) White, 1842; Cephaloplatus (Dolichoplatus) Gross, 1970; Cephaloplatus (Melanoplatus) Gross, 1970

Genus of true bugs

Cephaloplatus is a genus of shield bugs in the tribe Carpocorini.

== Species ==
- Cephaloplatus (Cephaloplatus) australis Dallas, 1851
- Cephaloplatus (Cephaloplatus) bellus Gross, 1970
- Cephaloplatus (Cephaloplatus) clementi Distant, 1910
- Cephaloplatus (Cephaloplatus) darwini Distant, 1910
- Cephaloplatus (Cephaloplatus) elegans McDonald, 1992
- Cephaloplatus (Cephaloplatus) explanatus Gross, 1970
- Cephaloplatus (Cephaloplatus) fasciatus Distant, 1881
- Cephaloplatus (Cephaloplatus) granulatus Bergroth, 1895
- Cephaloplatus (Cephaloplatus) minchami Gross, 1976
- Cephaloplatus (Cephaloplatus) nubifer Bergroth, 1916
- Cephaloplatus (Cephaloplatus) pallipes Walker, 1868
- Cephaloplatus (Cephaloplatus) pellewensis Gross, 1970
- Cephaloplatus (Cephaloplatus) pertyi (White, 1842)
- Cephaloplatus (Cephaloplatus) reticulatus Bergroth, 1895
- Cephaloplatus (Cephaloplatus) spurcatus Walker, 1867
- Cephaloplatus (Dolichoplatus) elongatus Distant, 1899
- Cephaloplatus (Melanoplatus) minor Distant, 1910
