= Oebalus mexicanus =

Scientific classification
- Domain: Eukaryota
- Kingdom: Animalia
- Phylum: Arthropoda
- Class: Insecta
- Order: Hemiptera
- Suborder: Heteroptera
- Family: Pentatomidae
- Tribe: Carpocorini
- Genus: Oebalus
- Species: O. mexicanus

Binomial name
- Oebalus mexicanus (Sailer, 1944)

Species of true bug

Oebalus mexicanus is a species of stink bug in the family Pentatomidae. It is found in Central America and North America.
