= Trichopepla aurora =

Scientific classification
- Domain: Eukaryota
- Kingdom: Animalia
- Phylum: Arthropoda
- Class: Insecta
- Order: Hemiptera
- Suborder: Heteroptera
- Family: Pentatomidae
- Tribe: Carpocorini
- Genus: Trichopepla
- Species: T. aurora

Binomial name
- Trichopepla aurora Van Duzee, 1918

Species of true bug

Trichopepla aurora is a species of stink bug in the family Pentatomidae. It is found in North America.
