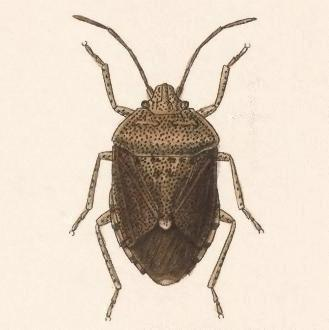

Scientific classification
- Domain: Eukaryota
- Kingdom: Animalia
- Phylum: Arthropoda
- Class: Insecta
- Order: Hemiptera
- Suborder: Heteroptera
- Family: Pentatomidae
- Tribe: Carpocorini
- Genus: Trichopepla
- Species: T. dubia

Binomial name
- Trichopepla dubia (Dallas, 1851)

= Trichopepla dubia =

Species of true bug

Trichopepla dubia is a species of stink bug in the family Pentatomidae. It is found in Central America and North America.
