= Cephaloplatus elegans =

Scientific classification
- Kingdom: Animalia
- Phylum: Arthropoda
- Class: Insecta
- Order: Hemiptera
- Suborder: Heteroptera
- Family: Pentatomidae
- Genus: Cephaloplatus
- Species: C. elegans

Binomial name
- Cephaloplatus elegans McDonald, 1992

Synonyms
- Cephaloplatus (Cephaloplatus) elegans

Species of true bug

Cephaloplatus elegans is a species of shield bugs in the tribe Carpocorini. It is found in the Northern Territory, Australia.
