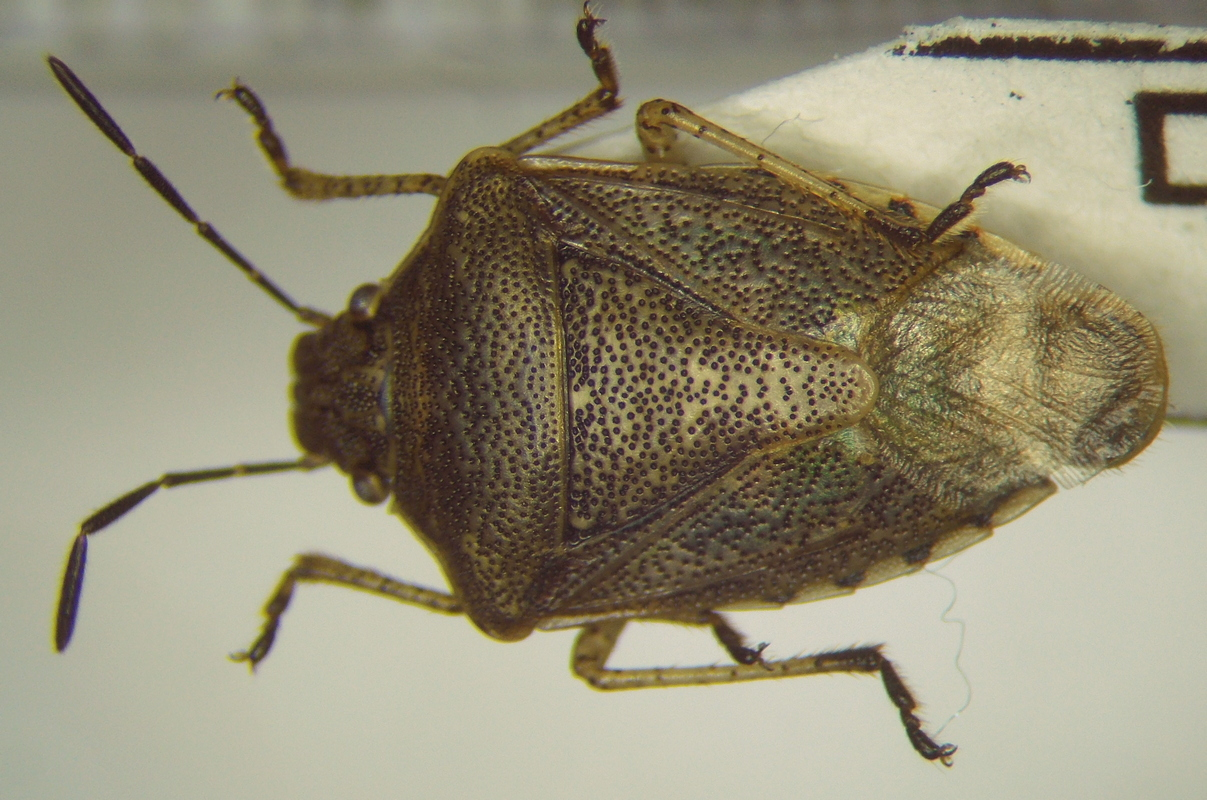
- Moromorpha tetra

Scientific classification
- Kingdom: Animalia
- Phylum: Arthropoda
- Class: Insecta
- Order: Hemiptera
- Suborder: Heteroptera
- Family: Pentatomidae
- Tribe: Carpocorini
- Genus: Moromorpha; Rolston, 1978
- Species: M. tetra

Binomial name
- Moromorpha tetra (Walker, 1868)

= Moromorpha =

Genus of true bugs

Moromorpha is a genus of stink bugs in the family Pentatomidae. There is one described species in Moromorpha, M. tetra.
