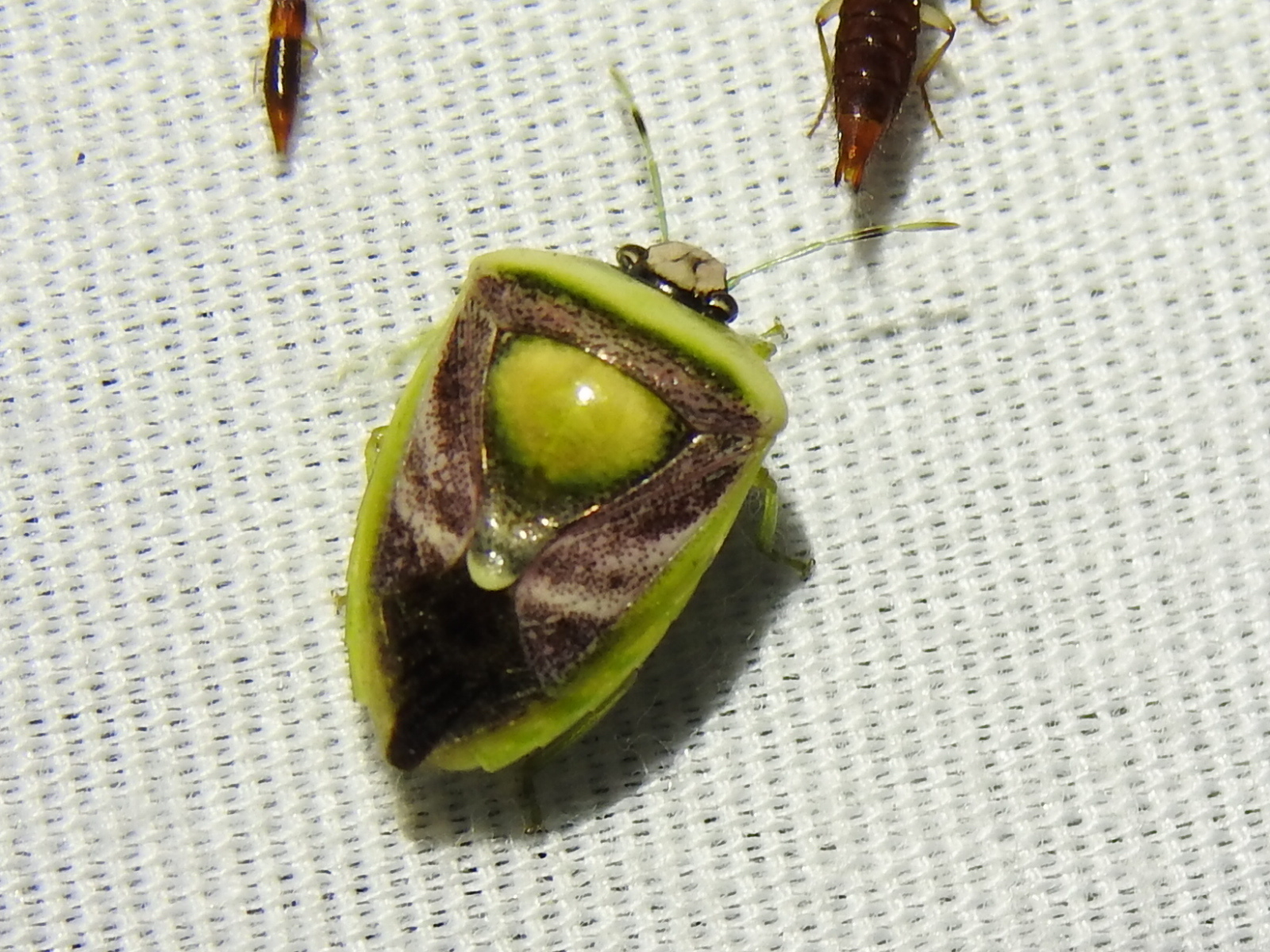
- Kermana imbuta

Scientific classification
- Kingdom: Animalia
- Phylum: Arthropoda
- Class: Insecta
- Order: Hemiptera
- Suborder: Heteroptera
- Family: Pentatomidae
- Tribe: Carpocorini
- Genus: Kermana; Rolston & McDonald, 1981
- Species: K. imbuta

Binomial name
- Kermana imbuta (Walker, 1867)

= Kermana =

Genus of true bugs

Kermana is a genus of stink bugs in the family Pentatomidae. There is one described species in Kermana, K. imbuta.
