= Vulsirea nigrorubra =

Scientific classification
- Kingdom: Animalia
- Phylum: Arthropoda
- Class: Insecta
- Order: Hemiptera
- Suborder: Heteroptera
- Family: Pentatomidae
- Genus: Vulsirea
- Species: V. nigrorubra

Binomial name
- Vulsirea nigrorubra Spinola, 1837

Species of true bug

Vulsirea nigrorubra is a species of stink bug in the family Pentatomidae. It is found in the Caribbean.
