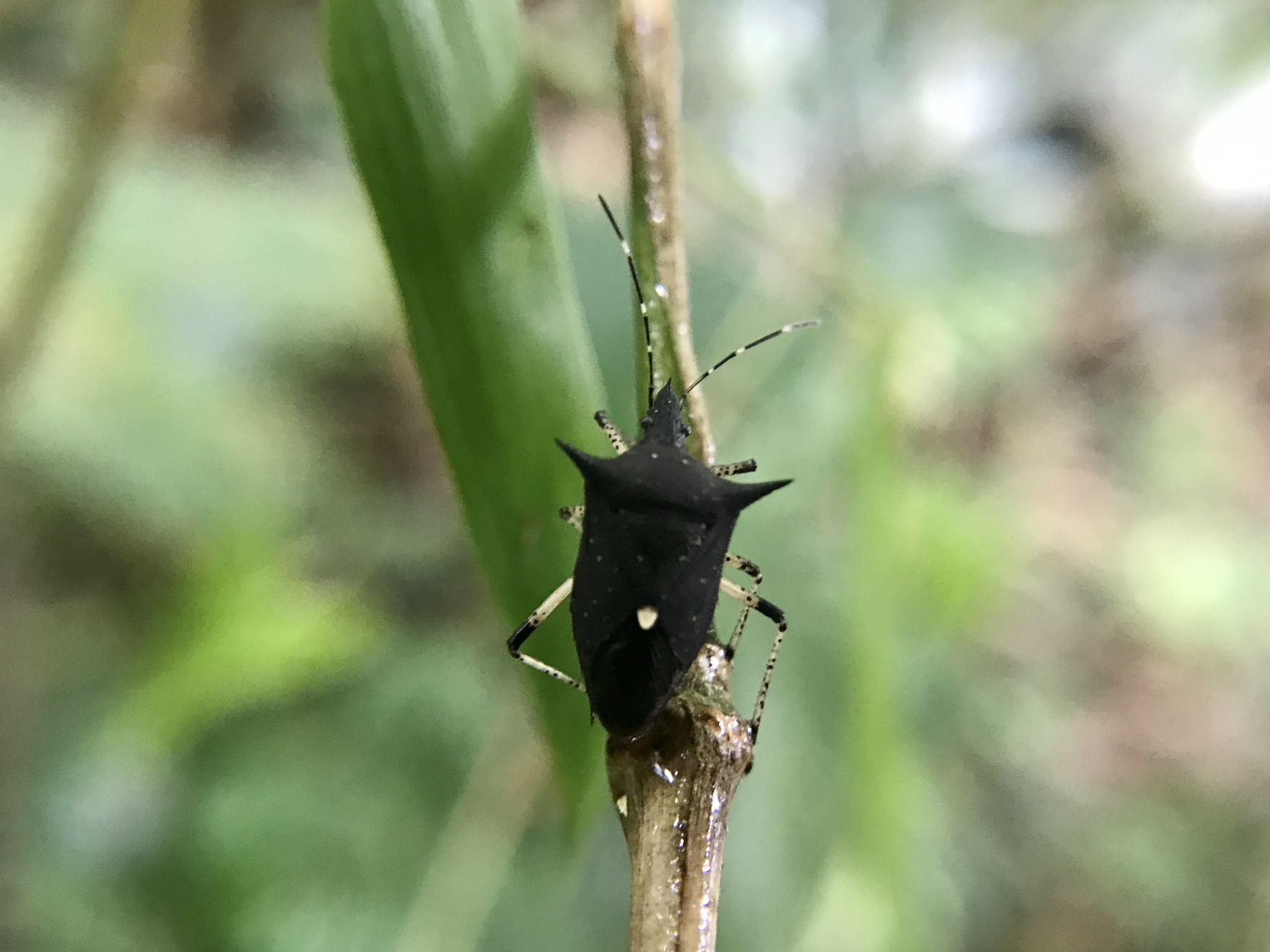

Scientific classification
- Domain: Eukaryota
- Kingdom: Animalia
- Phylum: Arthropoda
- Class: Insecta
- Order: Hemiptera
- Suborder: Heteroptera
- Family: Pentatomidae
- Tribe: Carpocorini
- Genus: Proxys
- Species: P. victor

Binomial name
- Proxys victor (Fabricius, 1775)

= Proxys victor =

Species of true bug

Proxys victor is a species of stink bug in the family Pentatomidae. It is found in South America, Central America, and North America.
