= Trichopepla atricornis =

Scientific classification
- Kingdom: Animalia
- Phylum: Arthropoda
- Clade: Pancrustacea
- Class: Insecta
- Order: Hemiptera
- Suborder: Heteroptera
- Family: Pentatomidae
- Tribe: Carpocorini
- Genus: Trichopepla
- Species: T. atricornis

Binomial name
- Trichopepla atricornis Stål, 1872

Species of true bug

Trichopepla atricornis is a species of stink bug in the family Pentatomidae. It is found in North America.
