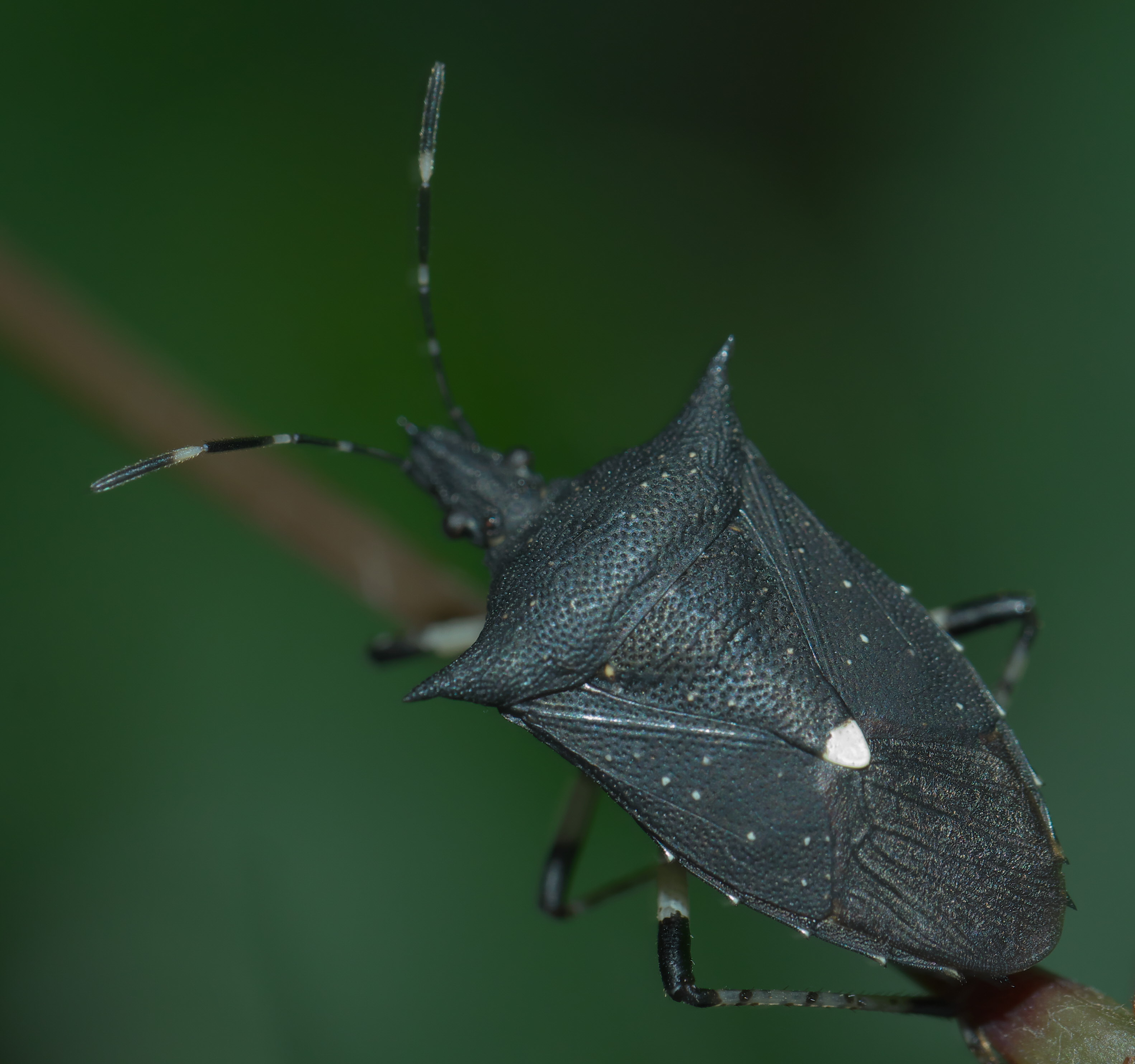

Scientific classification
- Domain: Eukaryota
- Kingdom: Animalia
- Phylum: Arthropoda
- Class: Insecta
- Order: Hemiptera
- Suborder: Heteroptera
- Family: Pentatomidae
- Tribe: Carpocorini
- Genus: Proxys
- Species: P. punctulatus

Binomial name
- Proxys punctulatus (Palisot, 1818)

= Proxys punctulatus =

Species of true bug

Proxys punctulatus, the black stink bug, is a species of stink bug in the family Pentatomidae. It is found in the Caribbean Sea, Central America, and North America.

== Description ==
The adult of P. punctulatus is 11-13 mm long and has a mostly black body with a yellow spot at the apex of the scutellum. There are six legs which are black and cream in colour. The head as well as the humeral angles of the pronotum are pointed.

== Life cycle ==
The life cycle of this species has been studied in Union County, Illinois. Adults overwinter in leaf litter near their host plants. They become active in June and reproduce. Eggs are usually laid singly. These eggs hatch into nymphs which go through five instars. A laboratory experiment, rearing P. punctulatus on Tradescantia subaspera under constant temperature and light, found that on average egg incubation takes 9.04 days while the five nymphal instars take 5.06, 7.15, 7.56, 9.32, and 15.93 days.

== Diet ==
Proxys punctulatus is omnivorous, feeding on both plant juices and on insect larvae. It has been found on blackberry, spiderwort, cotton, soybean and citrus plants. Feeding results in disfigured leaves and discolored areas on stems, but this damage is usually insignificant since the bugs never reach high populations.

== Aposematism ==
The distinctive colouration of P. punctulatus may signal its unpalatability to predators such as birds (aposematism). Some predatory stink bugs share its black colouration and are capable of stabbing with their strong proboscis to deter predators.

== Pheromones ==
Like many other stink bug species, P. punctulatus is attracted to traps baited with Euschistus pheromones.
