= Holcostethus abbreviatus =

Scientific classification
- Kingdom: Animalia
- Phylum: Arthropoda
- Class: Insecta
- Order: Hemiptera
- Suborder: Heteroptera
- Family: Pentatomidae
- Tribe: Carpocorini
- Genus: Holcostethus
- Species: H. abbreviatus

Binomial name
- Holcostethus abbreviatus Uhler, 1872

Species of true bug

Holcostethus abbreviatus is a species of stink bug in the family Pentatomidae. It is found in Central America and North America.
