= Holcostethus fulvipes =

Scientific classification
- Domain: Eukaryota
- Kingdom: Animalia
- Phylum: Arthropoda
- Class: Insecta
- Order: Hemiptera
- Suborder: Heteroptera
- Family: Pentatomidae
- Tribe: Carpocorini
- Genus: Holcostethus
- Species: H. fulvipes

Binomial name
- Holcostethus fulvipes (Ruckes, 1957)

Species of true bug

Holcostethus fulvipes is a species of stink bug in the family Pentatomidae. It is found in North America.
