= Hymenarcys crassa =

Scientific classification
- Domain: Eukaryota
- Kingdom: Animalia
- Phylum: Arthropoda
- Class: Insecta
- Order: Hemiptera
- Suborder: Heteroptera
- Family: Pentatomidae
- Tribe: Carpocorini
- Genus: Hymenarcys
- Species: H. crassa

Binomial name
- Hymenarcys crassa Uhler, 1897

Species of true bug

Hymenarcys crassa is a species of stink bug in the family Pentatomidae. It is found in Central America and North America.
