= Holcostethus piceus =

Scientific classification
- Domain: Eukaryota
- Kingdom: Animalia
- Phylum: Arthropoda
- Class: Insecta
- Order: Hemiptera
- Suborder: Heteroptera
- Family: Pentatomidae
- Tribe: Carpocorini
- Genus: Holcostethus
- Species: H. piceus

Binomial name
- Holcostethus piceus (Dallas, 1851)

Species of true bug

Holcostethus piceus is a species of stink bug in the family Pentatomidae. It is found in North America.
