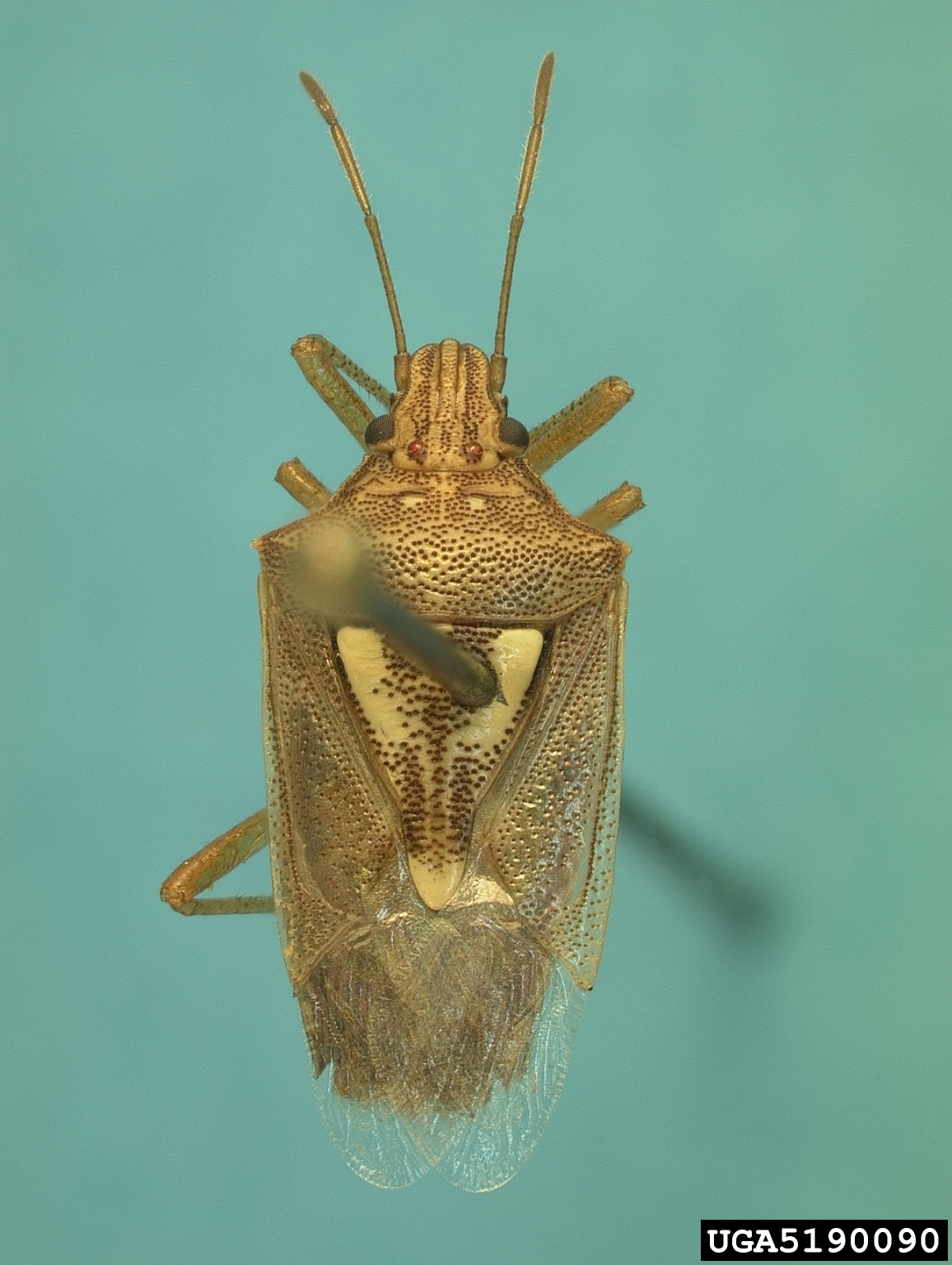

Scientific classification
- Domain: Eukaryota
- Kingdom: Animalia
- Phylum: Arthropoda
- Class: Insecta
- Order: Hemiptera
- Suborder: Heteroptera
- Family: Pentatomidae
- Genus: Oebalus
- Species: O. ypsilongriseus

Binomial name
- Oebalus ypsilongriseus (De Geer, 1773)

= Oebalus ypsilongriseus =

Species of true bug

Oebalus ypsilongriseus is a species of stink bug in the family Pentatomidae. It is native to South America, where it is known to feed on rice crops, as well as cotton, barley, oat, and wheat.
