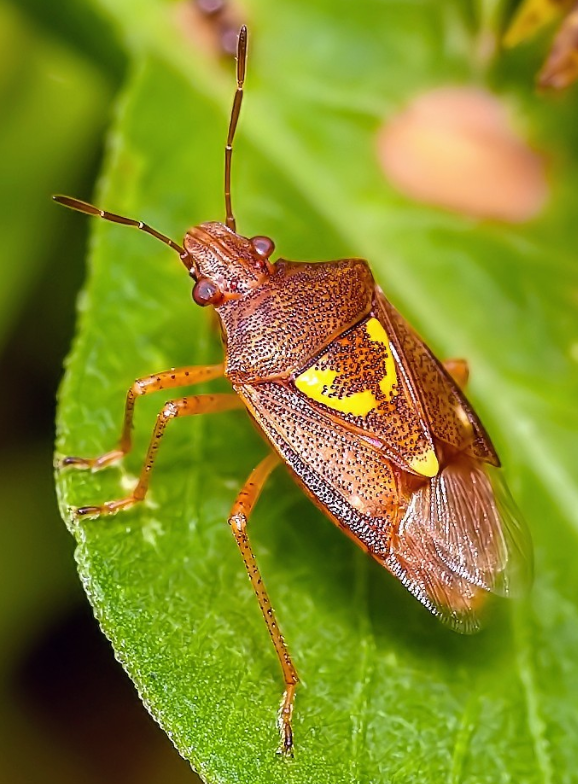

Scientific classification
- Kingdom: Animalia
- Phylum: Arthropoda
- Clade: Pancrustacea
- Class: Insecta
- Order: Hemiptera
- Suborder: Heteroptera
- Family: Pentatomidae
- Genus: Oebalus
- Species: O. insularis

Binomial name
- Oebalus insularis Stål, 1872

Synonyms
- Solubea insularis (Stål, 1872)

= Oebalus insularis =

Species of stink bug

Oebalus insularis, known as the island stink bug and the coffee-colored rice bug, is a species of stink bug found in tropical and subtropical regions. This species is known for its role as an agricultural pest, particularly in rice fields, where it feeds on developing grains by piercing them with its proboscis.

== Description ==
Oebalus insularis has a shield-shaped body typical of stink bugs and features a distinctive brown coloration with yellow markings on its scutellum. The body tapers toward the rear, with semi-transparent wings folded neatly over its back. The legs and antennae are slender and brown, with a segmented appearance. The insect's exoskeleton appears slightly textured, and it has a small head with dark, compound eyes.

O. insularis has a genital structure similar to Oebalus poecilus, but O. insularis can be recognized by a small tooth on the inner rim of the lateral angle of the pygophore (genital capsule of an insect). The paramere is regularly concave in lateral view and its apex is linear in dorsal view.

== Range ==
Oebalus insularis is primarily found in tropical and subtropical regions, including Florida, where it has recently established itself in rice-growing areas. It is found in Costa Rica, Mexico, the United States, Colombia, and other South American countries.

== Habitat and ecology ==
Oebalus insularis has become a significant pest in rice fields. In Florida surveys conducted in 2008 and 2009, it was the second most abundant species, comprising 20% of all stink bugs collected and present in all sampled fields. First recorded in Florida in 1932, it was not previously reported in rice fields. Its main hosts are Oryza sativa (Asian cultivated rice) and Echinochloa colona (wild rice). Adults and nymphs use their piercing-sucking mouthparts to suck the sap from the plants and developing seeds, producing 'pecky' rice. Early indication of O. insularis is damage on rice panicles. This feeding habit can cause significant damage to crops, reducing yield and quality.

It is recorded as occurring most from May to October, with spikes in sightings during May, June, and August. Species of Telenomus (a genus of wasps) have been found parasitizing the eggs of O. insularis, making them promising biological control agents against this species. Several rice varieties have also been evaluated for resistance to O. insularis.
