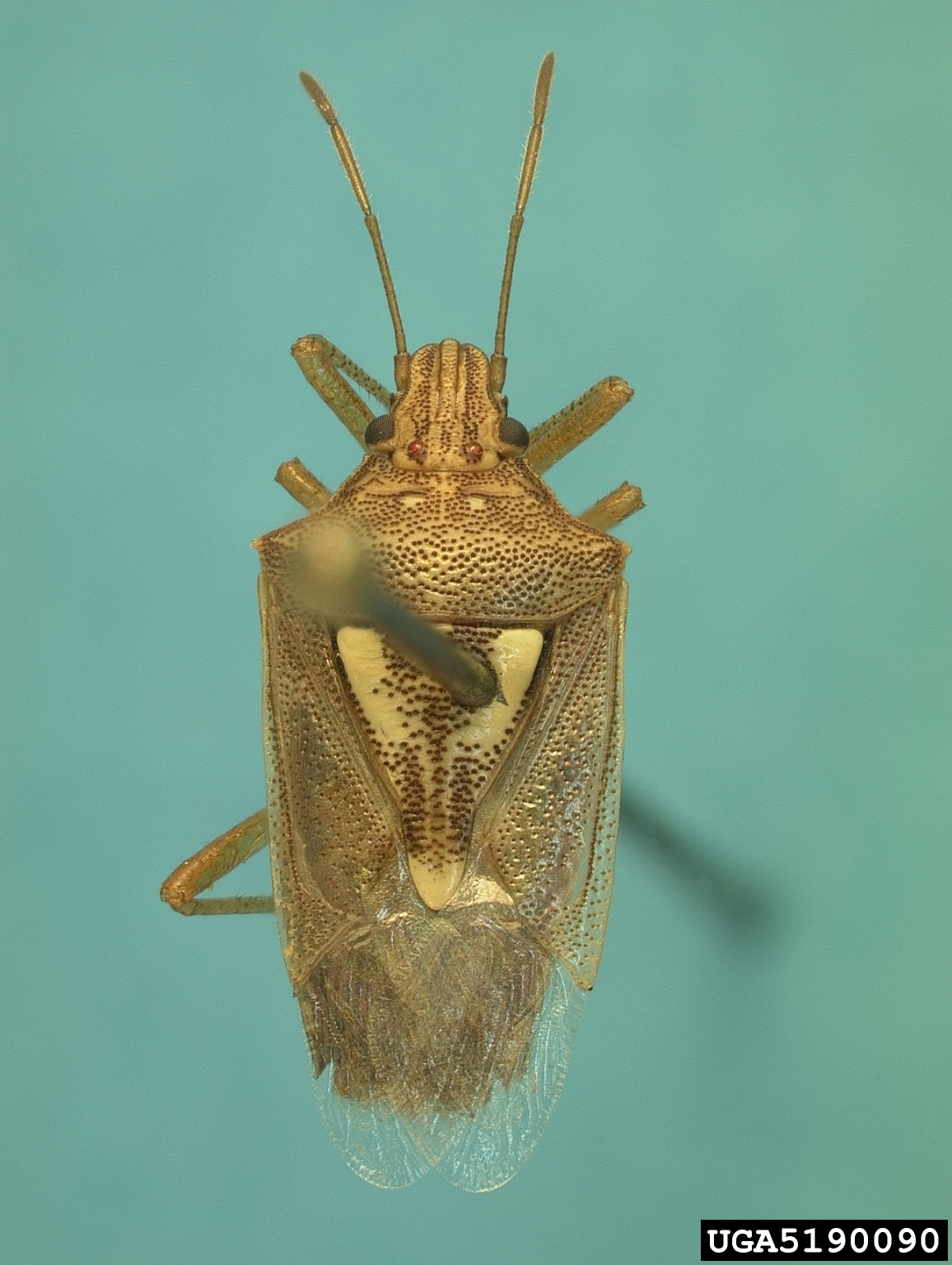
- Oebalus ypsilongriseus

Scientific classification
- Kingdom: Animalia
- Phylum: Arthropoda
- Clade: Pancrustacea
- Class: Insecta
- Order: Hemiptera
- Suborder: Heteroptera
- Family: Pentatomidae
- Subfamily: Pentatominae
- Tribe: Carpocorini
- Genus: Oebalus; Stål, 1862

= Oebalus (bug) =

Genus of true bugs

Oebalus is a genus of stink bugs in the family Pentatomidae. There are about six described species in Oebalus.

== Species ==
These six species belong to the genus Oebalus:

- Oebalus grisescens (Sailer, 1944)^{i c g}
- Oebalus insularis Stål, 1872^{i c g}
- Oebalus mexicanus (Sailer, 1944)^{i c g b}
- Oebalus poecilus (Dallas, 1851)^{g}
- Oebalus pugnax (Fabricius, 1775)^{i c g b} – rice stink bug
- Oebalus ypsilongriseus (De Geer, 1773)^{g b}

Data sources: i = ITIS, c = Catalogue of Life, g = GBIF, b = Bugguide.net
