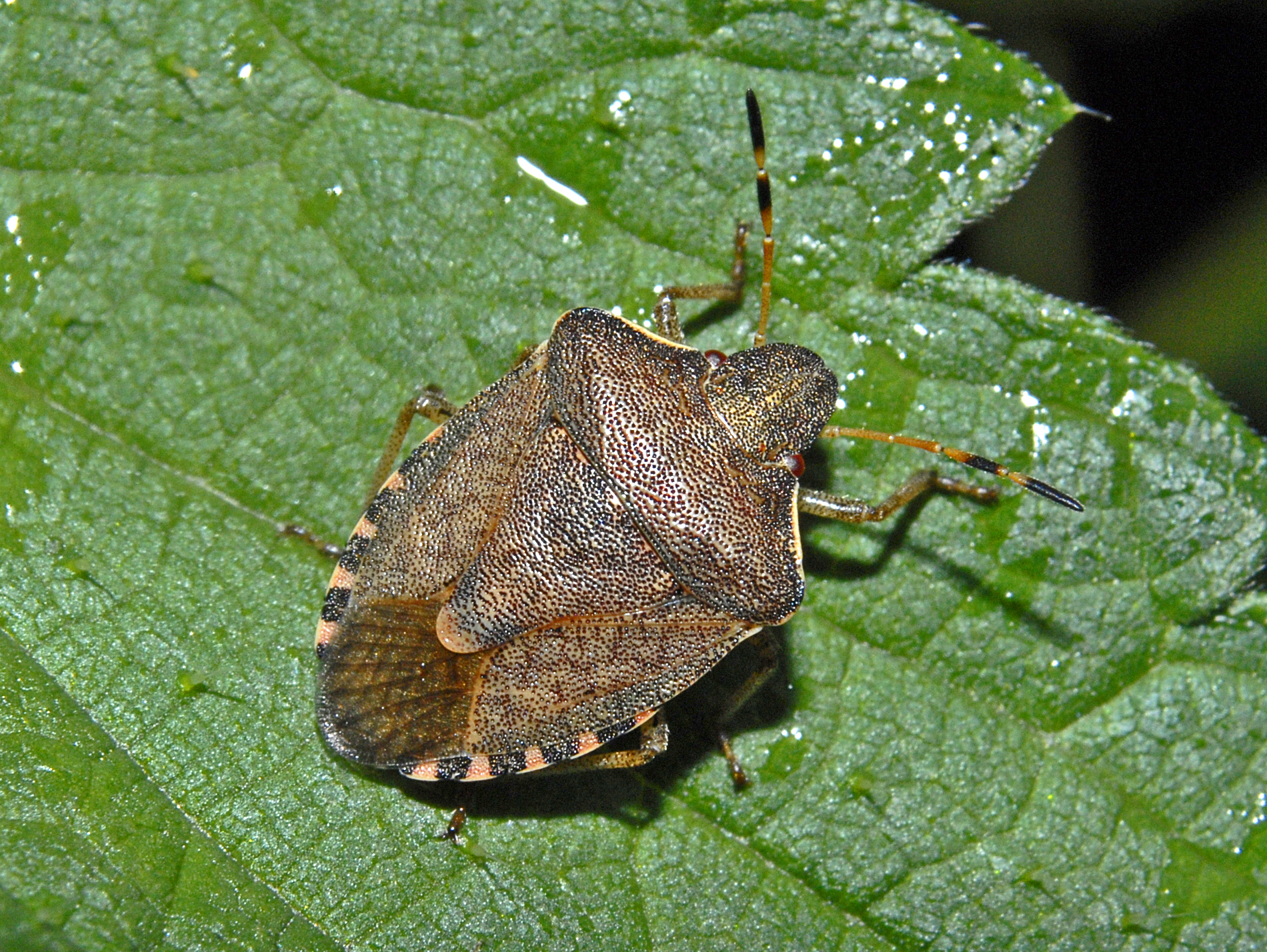
- Peribalus strictus strictus

Scientific classification
- Kingdom: Animalia
- Phylum: Arthropoda
- Class: Insecta
- Order: Hemiptera
- Suborder: Heteroptera
- Family: Pentatomidae
- Genus: Peribalus
- Species: P. strictus

Binomial name
- Peribalus strictus (Fabricius, 1803)

Synonyms
- Holcostethus strictus vernalis; Cimex strictus Fabricius, 1803; Holcostethus strictus (Fabricius, 1803); Peribalus vernalis Wolff 1804

= Peribalus strictus =

Species of true bug

Peribalus strictus, the vernal shieldbug, is a species of shield bugs in the family Pentatomidae.

== Subspecies ==
- Peribalus strictus capitatus Jakovlev, 1889
- Peribalus strictus strictus (Fabricius, 1803)
- Peribalus strictus vernalis (Wolff, 1804)

== Distribution and habitat ==
This species is widespread in Europe (with the exception of the north of the British Isles and Scandinavia), across Siberia and Central Asia up to northern China and Japan. These shieldbugs prefer dry to moderately moist, warm areas. They usually occur in clearings and in rather damp environments.

== Description ==
Peribalus strictus can reach a length of 9.5–11 millimetres (0.37–0.43 in). These quite variable shieldbugs have a greenish-brown coloration and a dense dark punctuation on the head, elytrae, pronotum and scutellum. The margins of the pronotum are yellowish and quite concave and the scutellum has a pale yellowish tip. The connexivum is distinctly banded pale brown and black. The antennae are orange yellow, but the final two segments are black. In spring and summer the coloration is usually lighter than in autumn.

Peribalus vernalis was one time considered a separate species, nowadays it is considered a subspecies (Peribalus strictus vernalis). This subspecies shows a black ring on articles IV and V of the antennae, the tip of the scutellum is not punctuated and the femora are covered with small black dots.

== Biology ==
These stink bugs live on various herbs, shrubs and deciduous trees. They are polyphagous. The nymphs especially feed on the ripe fruits and seeds of herbaceous plants, mainly Asteraceae and Fabaceae species.

The adults can be found in the spring and fall sucking on flowering and fruit-bearing shrubs and trees, frequently feeding on flowers of Apiaceae and Scrophulariaceae, such as mullein (Verbascum species). Adults can be found all year and hibernation takes place as imago. The following year, the adult new generation occur from the end of July.

== Gallery ==
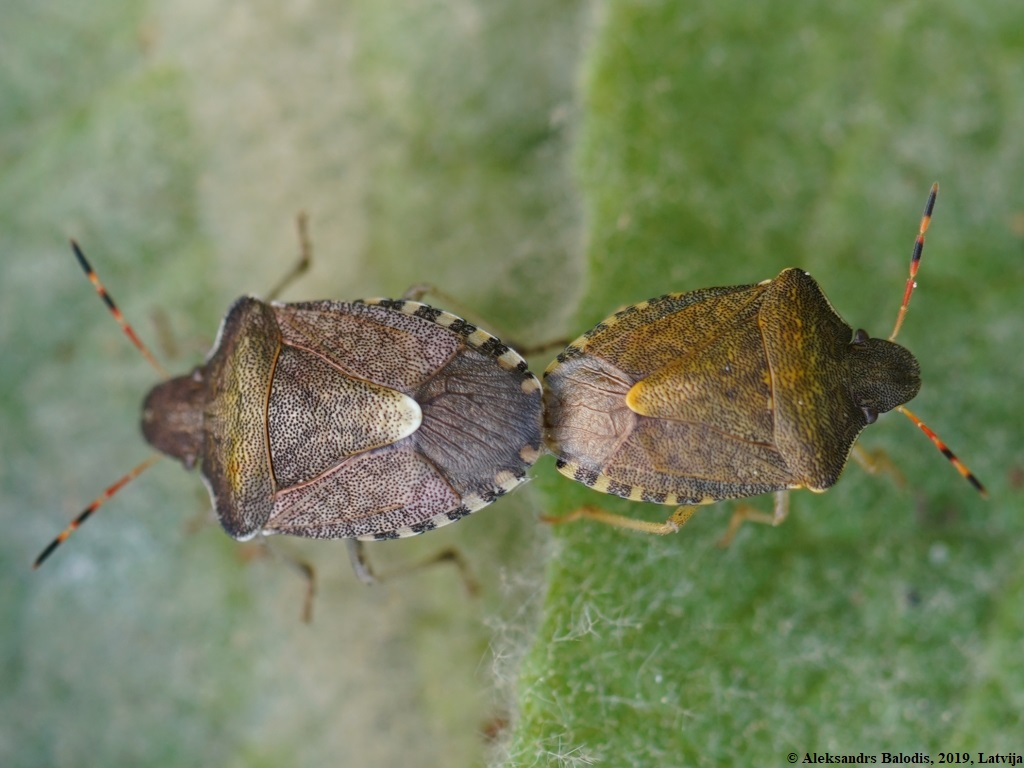
Mating

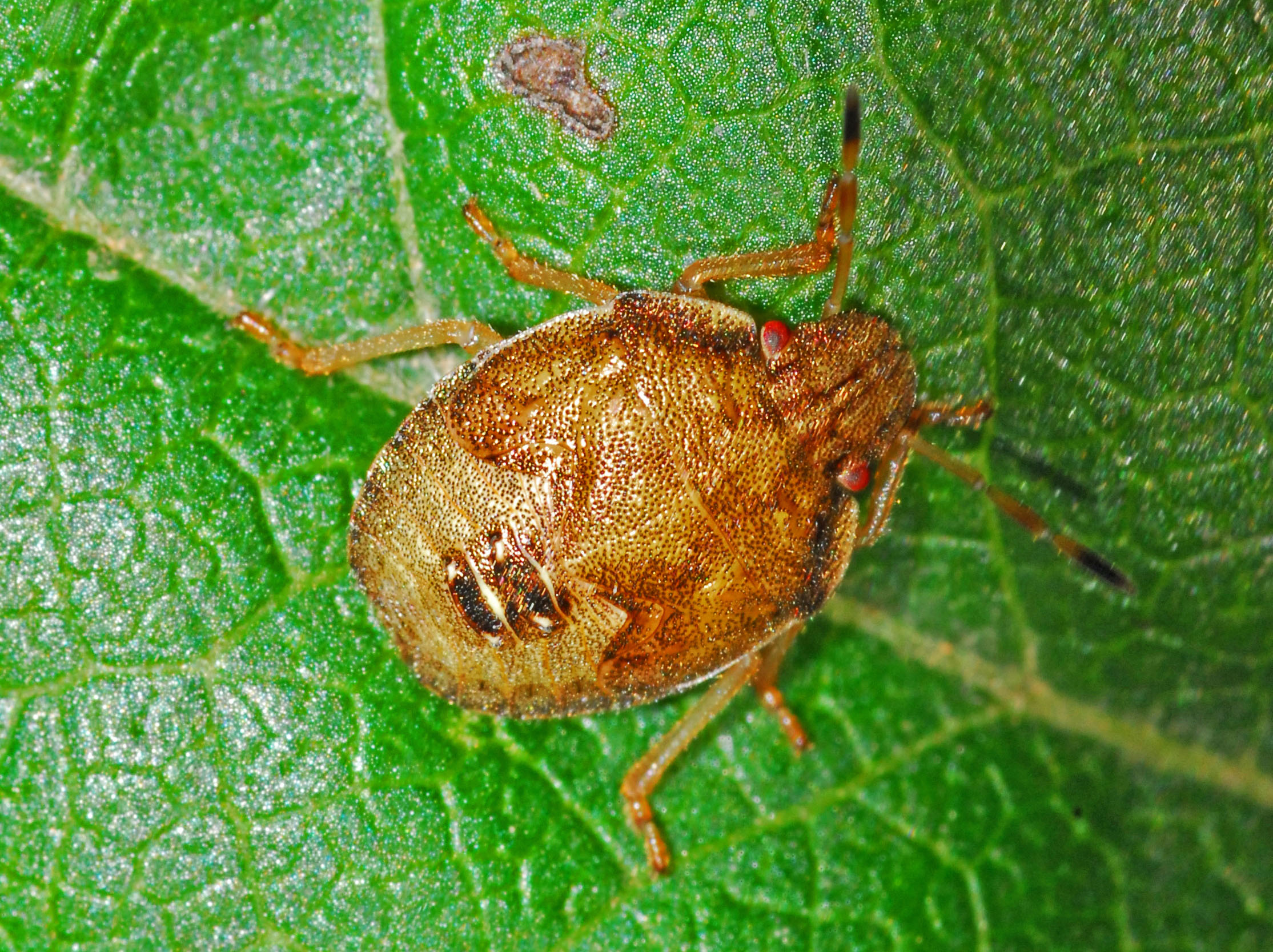
Nymph

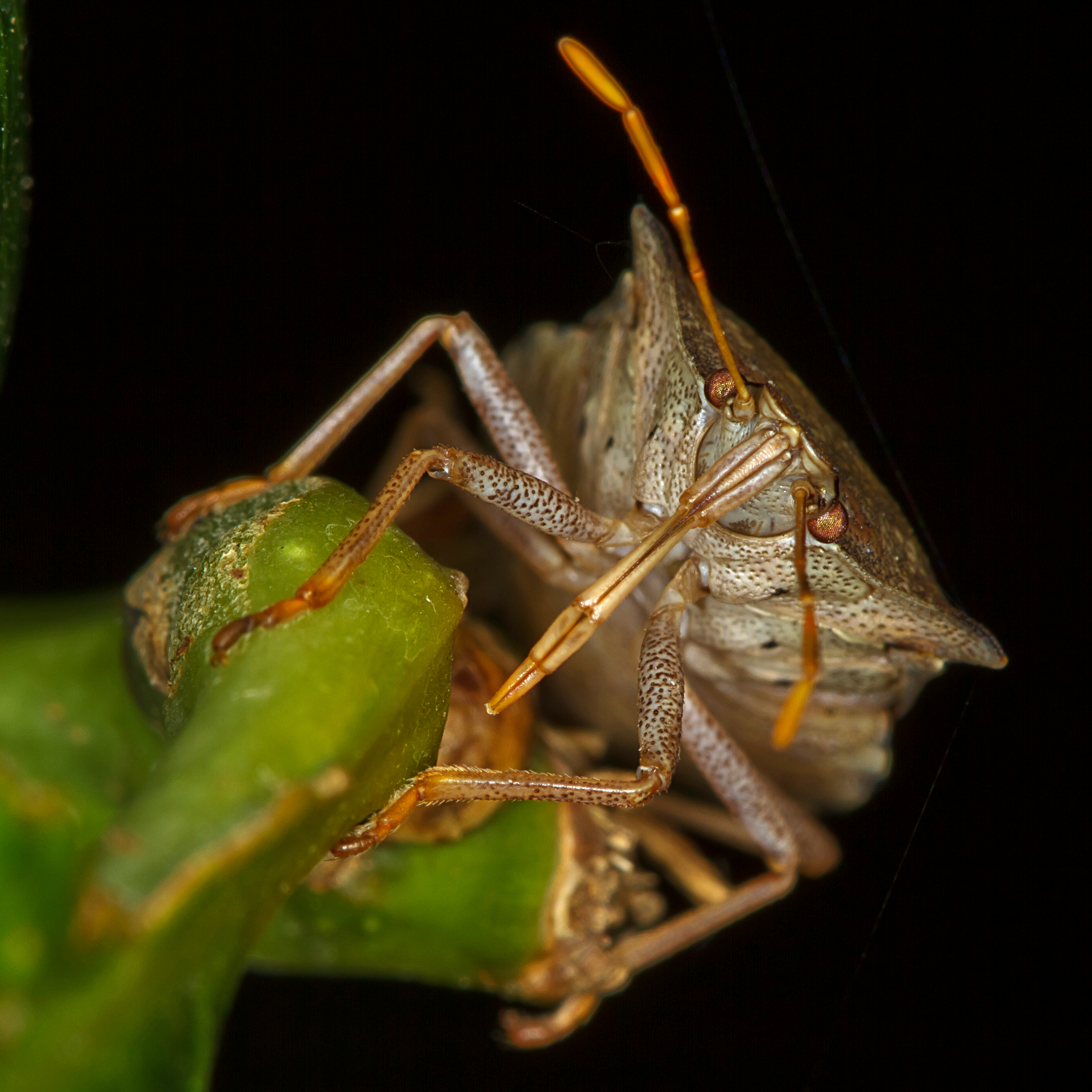
Imago, front view

Video clip of P. strictus in copula

== Bibliography ==
- Ekkehard Wachmann, Albert Melber, Jürgen Deckert: Wanzen. Band 4: Pentatomomorpha II: Pentatomoidea: Cydnidae, Thyreocoridae, Plataspidae, Acanthosomatidae, Scutelleridae, Pentatomidae. Goecke & Evers, Keltern 2008, ISBN 978-3-937783-36-9.
