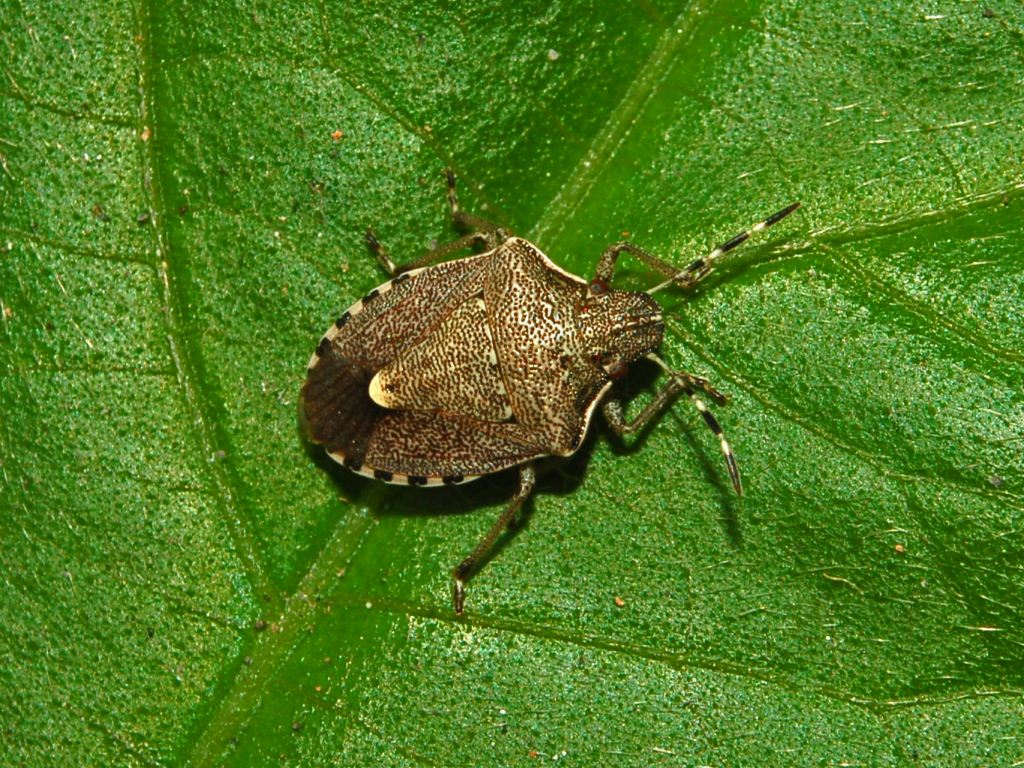
- Holcostethus albipes

Scientific classification
- Kingdom: Animalia
- Phylum: Arthropoda
- Clade: Pancrustacea
- Class: Insecta
- Order: Hemiptera
- Suborder: Heteroptera
- Family: Pentatomidae
- Subfamily: Pentatominae
- Tribe: Carpocorini
- Genus: Holcostethus; Fieber, 1860

= Holcostethus =

Genus of true bugs

Holcostethus is a genus of shield bugs belonging to the family Pentatomidae, subfamily Pentatominae. These bugs, noted for their foul odour, are mostly found in the Palaearctic and Nearctic realms..

== Species ==
These 18 species belong to the genus Holcostethus.

- Holcostethus abbreviatus Uhler, 1872
- Holcostethus albipes (Fabricius, 1781)
- Holcostethus breviceps Horváth, 1897
- Holcostethus evae Ribes, 1988
- Holcostethus fissiceps Horváth, 1906
- Holcostethus fulvipes (Ruckes, 1957)
- Holcostethus hirtus (Van Duzee, 1937)
- Holcostethus limbolarius (Stål, 1872)
- Holcostethus macdonaldi Rider & Rolston, 1995
- Holcostethus piceus (Dallas, 1851)
- Holcostethus ovatus (Jakovlev, 1889)
- Holcostethus piceus (Dallas, 1851)
- Holcostethus punctatus (Lindberg, 1935)
- Holcostethus ruckesi McDonald, 1975
- Holcostethus sphacelatus (Fabricius, 1794)
- Holcostethus strictus (Fabricius, 1803)
- Holcostethus tristis (Van Duzee, 1904)
- Holcostethus vernalis (Wolff, 1804)
