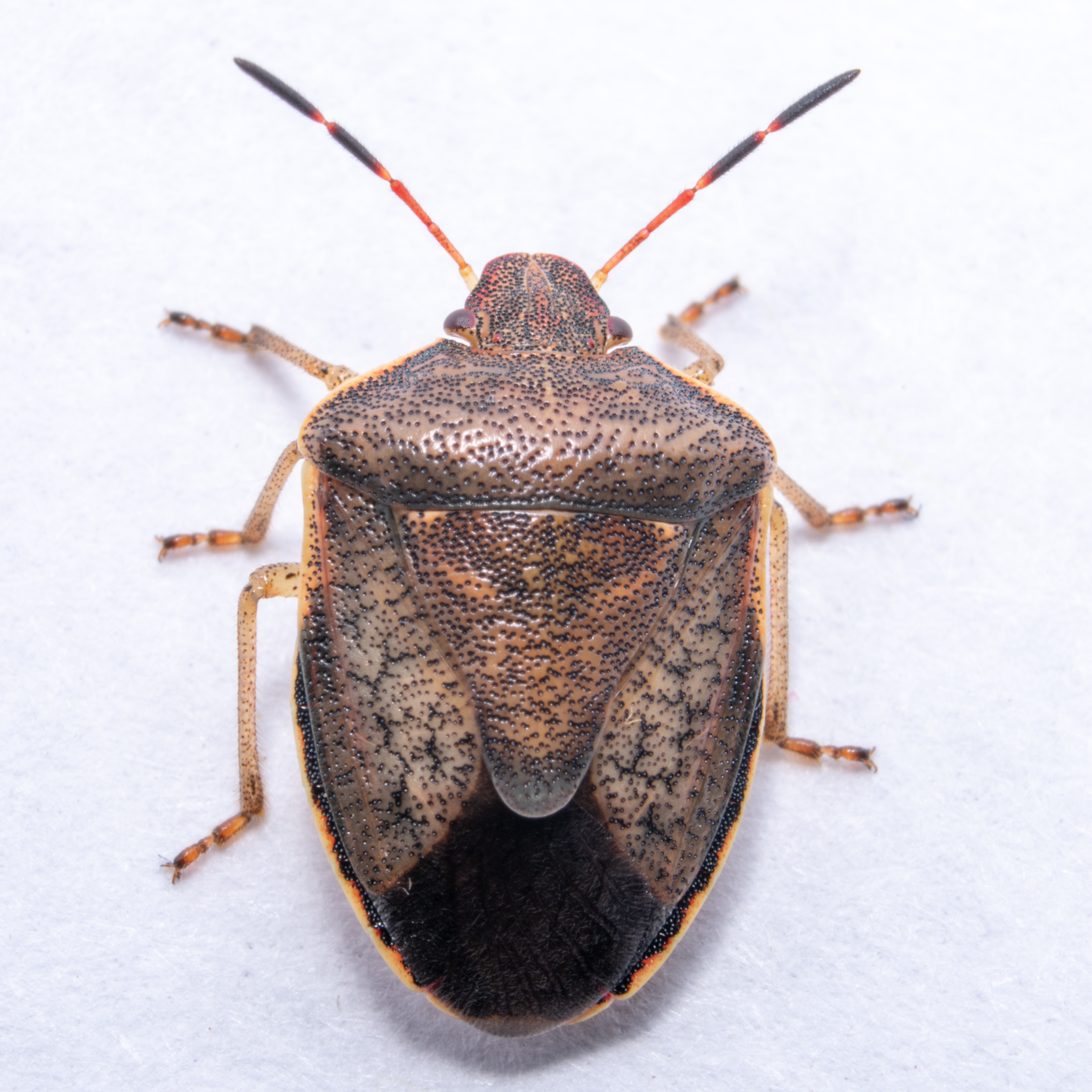

Scientific classification
- Kingdom: Animalia
- Phylum: Arthropoda
- Clade: Pancrustacea
- Class: Insecta
- Order: Hemiptera
- Suborder: Heteroptera
- Family: Pentatomidae
- Genus: Holcostethus
- Species: H. limbolarius

Binomial name
- Holcostethus limbolarius (Stål, 1872)

= Holcostethus limbolarius =

Species of true bug

Holcostethus limbolarius is a species of stink bug in the family Pentatomidae. It is found in Central America and North America.
