= Vulsirea =

Scientific classification
- Kingdom: Animalia
- Phylum: Arthropoda
- Class: Insecta
- Order: Hemiptera
- Suborder: Heteroptera
- Family: Pentatomidae
- Subfamily: Pentatominae
- Tribe: Catacanthini
- Genus: Vulsirea; Spinola, 1837

Genus of true bugs

Vulsirea is a genus of stink bugs in the family Pentatomidae. There are at least two described species in Vulsirea.

== Species ==
These two species belong to the genus Vulsirea:

- Vulsirea nigrorubra Spinola, 1837
- Vulsirea violacea (Fabricius, 1803)
