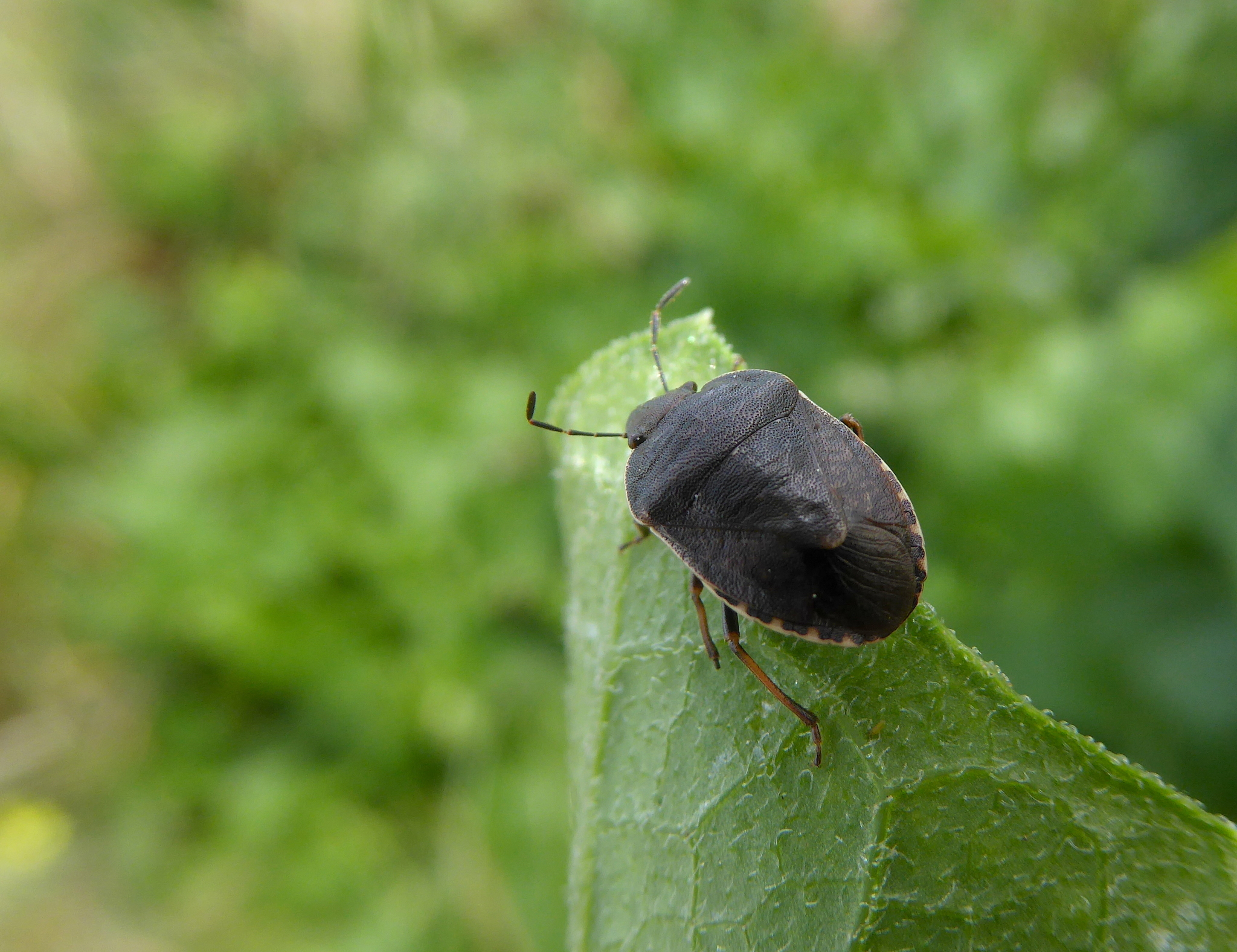

Scientific classification
- Domain: Eukaryota
- Kingdom: Animalia
- Phylum: Arthropoda
- Class: Insecta
- Order: Hemiptera
- Suborder: Heteroptera
- Family: Pentatomidae
- Genus: Holcostethus
- Species: H. tristis

Binomial name
- Holcostethus tristis (Van Duzee, 1904)

= Holcostethus tristis =

Species of true bug

Holcostethus tristis is a species of stink bug in the family Pentatomidae. It is found in North America.
