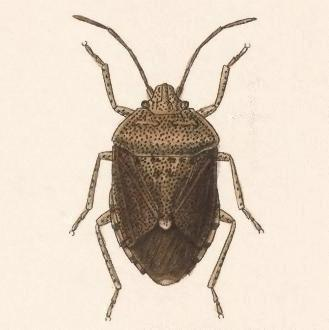
- Trichopepla dubia

Scientific classification
- Kingdom: Animalia
- Phylum: Arthropoda
- Clade: Pancrustacea
- Class: Insecta
- Order: Hemiptera
- Suborder: Heteroptera
- Family: Pentatomidae
- Subfamily: Pentatominae
- Tribe: Carpocorini
- Genus: Trichopepla; Stål, 1867

= Trichopepla =

Genus of true bugs

Trichopepla is a genus of stink bugs in the family Pentatomidae. There are about six described species in Trichopepla.

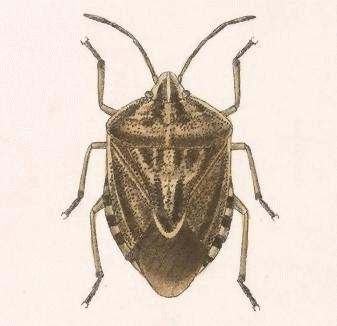
Trichopepla semivittata

== Species ==
These six species belong to the genus Trichopepla:

- Trichopepla atricornis Stal, 1872
- Trichopepla aurora Van Duzee, 1918
- Trichopepla dubia (Dallas, 1851)
- Trichopepla grossa
- Trichopepla semivittata (Say, 1832)
- Trichopepla vandykei Van Duzee, 1918
