= Coenus delius =

Scientific classification
- Kingdom: Animalia
- Phylum: Arthropoda
- Class: Insecta
- Order: Hemiptera
- Suborder: Heteroptera
- Family: Pentatomidae
- Genus: Coenus
- Species: C. delius

Binomial name
- Coenus delius (Say, 1832)

Synonyms
- Coenus tarsalis Dallas, 1851

Species of true bug

Coenus delius is a species of stink bug in the family Pentatomidae. It is found in North America.
