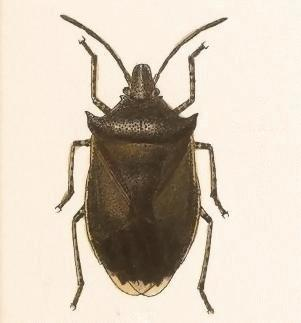

Scientific classification
- Kingdom: Animalia
- Phylum: Arthropoda
- Clade: Pancrustacea
- Class: Insecta
- Order: Hemiptera
- Suborder: Heteroptera
- Family: Pentatomidae
- Tribe: Pentatomini
- Genus: Padaeus; Stål, 1862
- Species: P. trivittatus

Binomial name
- Padaeus trivittatus Stål, 1872

= Padaeus =

Genus of true bugs

Padaeus is a genus of stink bugs in the family Pentatomidae. There is one described species in Padaeus, P. trivittatus.
