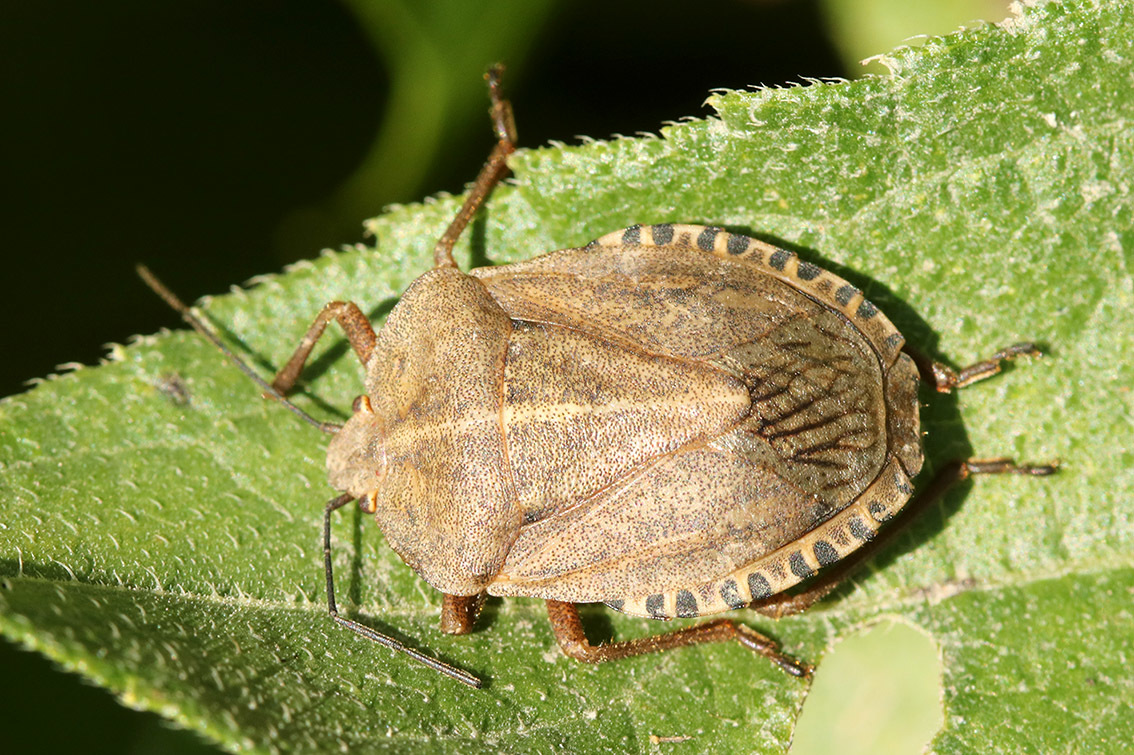
- Anhanga modesta

Scientific classification
- Kingdom: Animalia
- Phylum: Arthropoda
- Clade: Pancrustacea
- Class: Insecta
- Order: Hemiptera
- Suborder: Heteroptera
- Family: Pentatomidae
- Subfamily: Pentatominae
- Tribe: Carpocorini
- Genus: Anhanga; Distant, 1887

Type species
- Anhanga modesta Distant, 1887

Synonyms
- Ahanga Distant, 1887

= Anhanga (bug) =

Genus of shield bugs in the subfamily Discocephalinae

Anhanga is a genus of South American shield bugs, erected by William Lucas Distant in 1887.

== Taxonomy ==
Originally described from the subfamily Discocephalinae (Discocephalini), Anhanga was reassigned by a 2016 study to the Pentatominae subfamily. Anhanga is rare in museums with four specimens in total, and had not been evaluated since its description by Distant in 1887.

Anhanga's general and genital morphology aligns best with Galedanta, another Neotropical pentatomine shield bug. Mutually aligned features include a medium-sized to large body covered in punctures, mandibular plates rounded at apex which are convergent and longer than clypeus, and scutellum bearing foveae. Females bear finger-like processes, with males possessing a projected 'V-shaped' ventral rim of the pygophore. However, Anhanga can be distinguished by the rounded lateral angles of the anterolateral margin of pronotum crenulate along the anterior half of specimens.

== Ecology ==
Anhanga is endemic to the moist ranges of Atlantic forest in Rio Grande do Sul, Brazil, and the Buenos Aires Province, Argentina.
