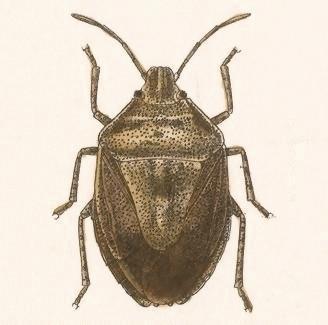
- Hymenarcys reticulata

Scientific classification
- Domain: Eukaryota
- Kingdom: Animalia
- Phylum: Arthropoda
- Class: Insecta
- Order: Hemiptera
- Suborder: Heteroptera
- Family: Pentatomidae
- Subfamily: Pentatominae
- Tribe: Carpocorini
- Genus: Hymenarcys; Amyot & Serville, 1843

= Hymenarcys =

Genus of true bugs

Hymenarcys is a genus of stink bugs in the family Pentatomidae. There are about five described species in Hymenarcys.

== Species ==
These five species belong to the genus Hymenarcys:

- Hymenarcys aequalis (Say, 1832)
- Hymenarcys crassa Uhler, 1897
- Hymenarcys nervosa (Say, 1832)
- Hymenarcys reticulata (Stål, 1872)
- † Hymenarcys cridlandi Lewis, 1969
