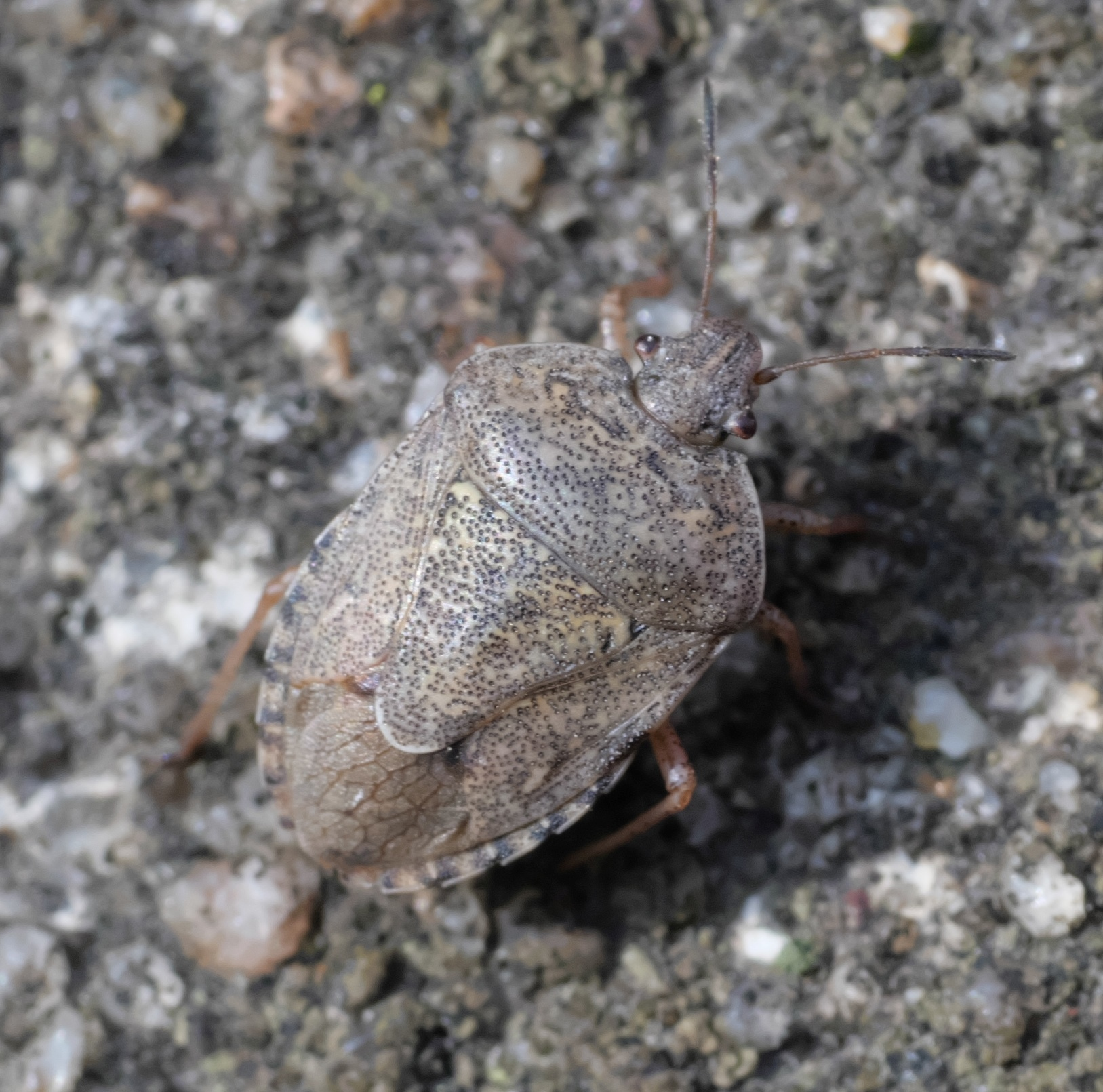
- Hymenarcys nervosa, Oklahoma

Scientific classification
- Domain: Eukaryota
- Kingdom: Animalia
- Phylum: Arthropoda
- Class: Insecta
- Order: Hemiptera
- Suborder: Heteroptera
- Family: Pentatomidae
- Genus: Hymenarcys
- Species: H. nervosa

Binomial name
- Hymenarcys nervosa (Say, 1832)

Synonyms
- Hymenarcys perpunctata Amyot and Serville, 1843

= Hymenarcys nervosa =

Species of true bug

Hymenarcys nervosa is a species of stink bug in the family Pentatomidae. It is found in North America, east of the Rocky Mountains.
