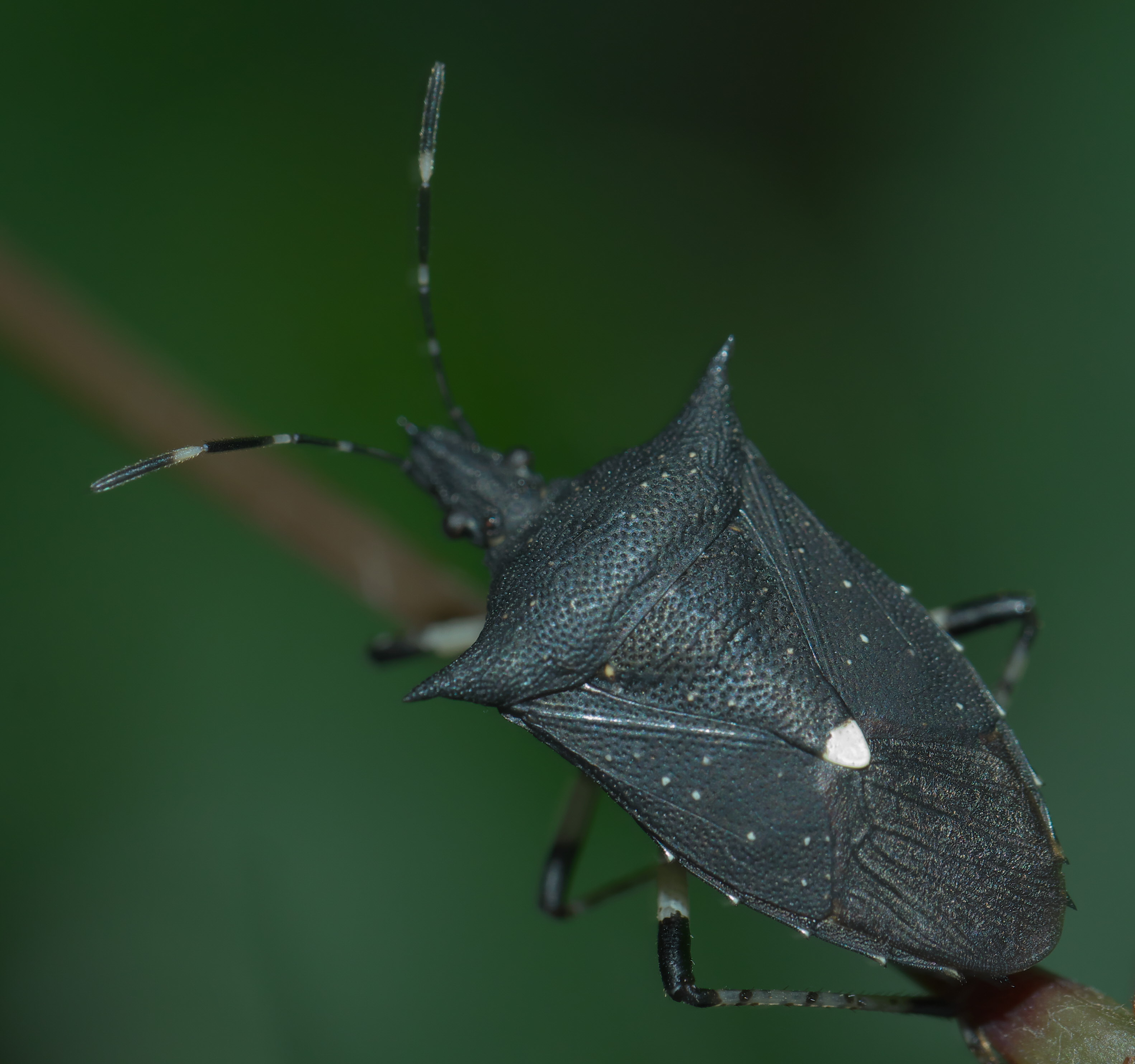
- Proxys punctulatus

Scientific classification
- Kingdom: Animalia
- Phylum: Arthropoda
- Class: Insecta
- Order: Hemiptera
- Suborder: Heteroptera
- Family: Pentatomidae
- Subfamily: Pentatominae
- Tribe: Carpocorini
- Genus: Proxys; Spinola, 1840

= Proxys =

Genus of true bugs

Proxys is a genus of stink bugs in the family Pentatomidae.

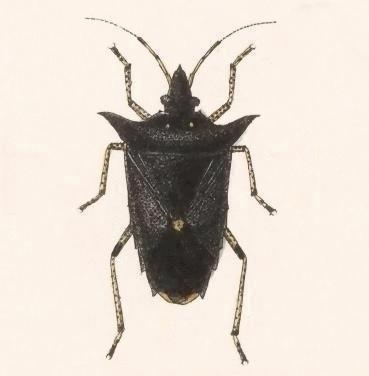
Proxys victor

== Species ==
- Proxys albopunctulatus (Palisot, 1811)
- Proxys obtusicornis Stål, 1872
- Proxys punctulatus (Palisot, 1818) – black stink bug
- Proxys victor (Fabricius, 1775)
