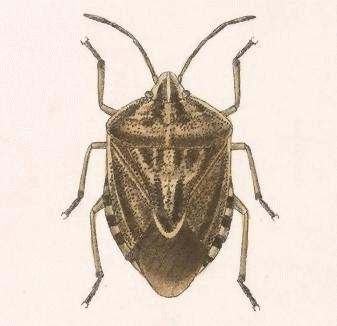

Scientific classification
- Domain: Eukaryota
- Kingdom: Animalia
- Phylum: Arthropoda
- Class: Insecta
- Order: Hemiptera
- Suborder: Heteroptera
- Family: Pentatomidae
- Genus: Trichopepla
- Species: T. semivittata

Binomial name
- Trichopepla semivittata (Say, 1832)

Synonyms
- Peribalus pilipes Dallas, 1851; Trichopepla pilipes (Dallas, 1851)

= Trichopepla semivittata =

Species of true bug

Trichopepla semivittata is a species of stink bug in the family Pentatomidae. It is found in Central America and North America.
