= Vulsirea violacea =

Scientific classification
- Kingdom: Animalia
- Phylum: Arthropoda
- Class: Insecta
- Order: Hemiptera
- Suborder: Heteroptera
- Family: Pentatomidae
- Genus: Vulsirea
- Species: V. violacea

Binomial name
- Vulsirea violacea (Fabricius, 1803)

Species of true bug

Vulsirea violacea is a species of stink bug in the family Pentatomidae. It is found in the Caribbean Sea, Central America, North America, and South America.
