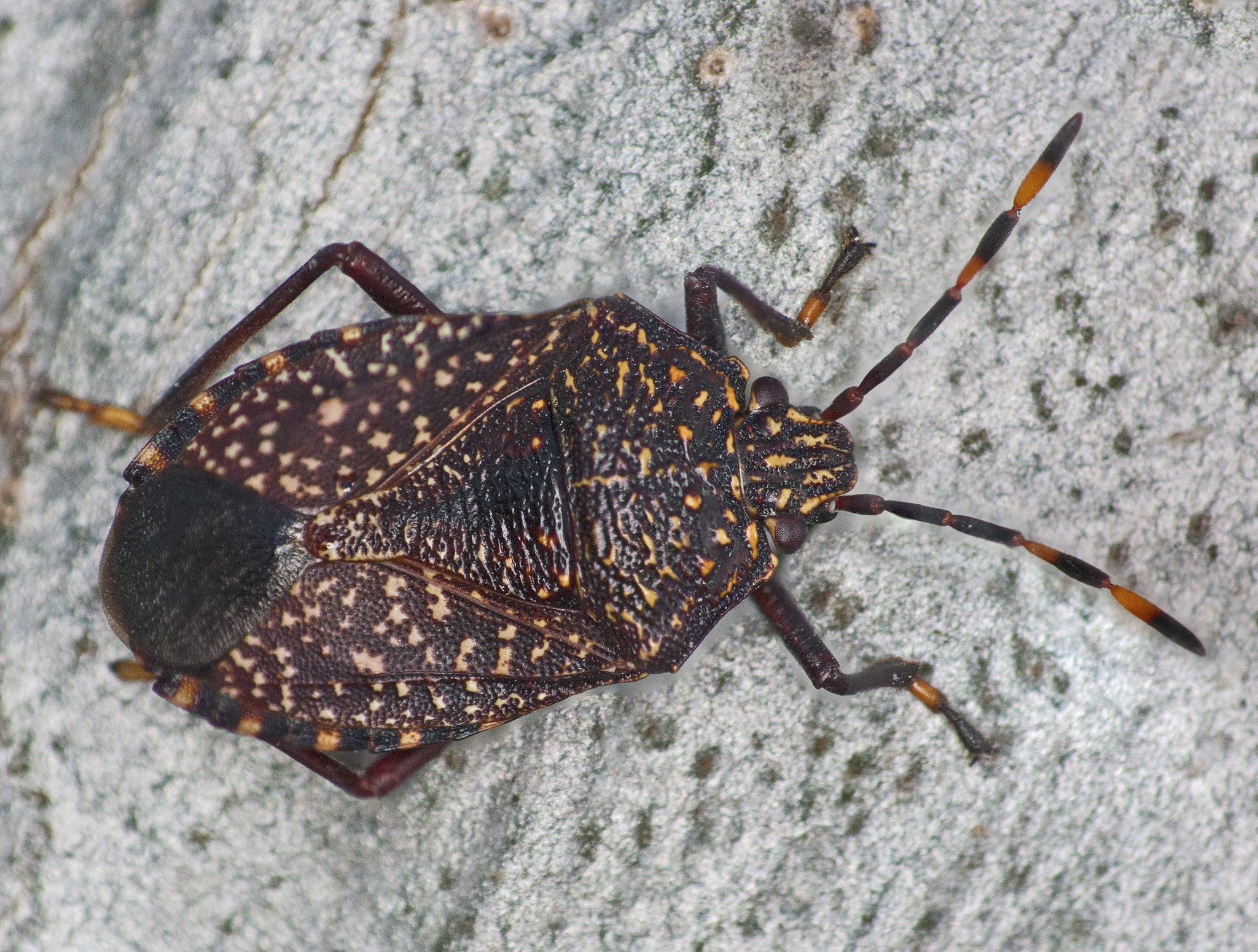

Scientific classification
- Domain: Eukaryota
- Kingdom: Animalia
- Phylum: Arthropoda
- Class: Insecta
- Order: Hemiptera
- Suborder: Heteroptera
- Family: Pentatomidae
- Genus: Notius
- Species: N. consputus

Binomial name
- Notius consputus Stål, 1865

= Notius consputus =

Species of bug

Notius consputus is a species of bug belonging to the stink bug family (Pentatomidae), first described by Carl Stål in 1865. It is found in Queensland, New South Wales, and Tasmania.
