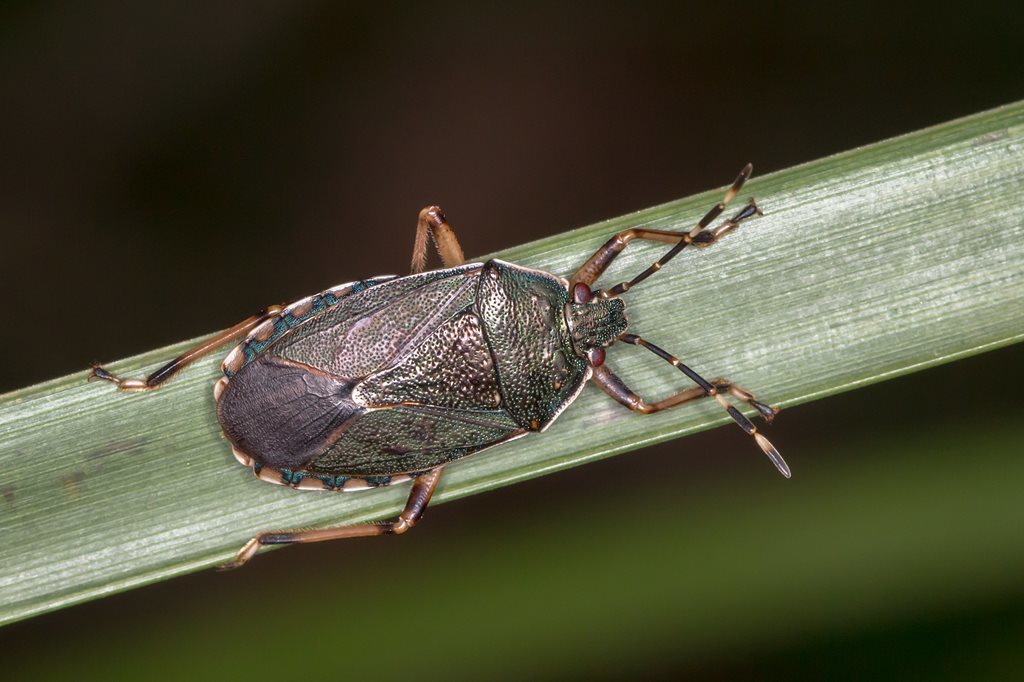
- Notius depressus

Scientific classification
- Domain: Eukaryota
- Kingdom: Animalia
- Phylum: Arthropoda
- Class: Insecta
- Order: Hemiptera
- Suborder: Heteroptera
- Family: Pentatomidae
- Tribe: Carpocorini
- Genus: Notius; Dallas, 1851

Species
- See text

= Notius =

Genus of true bugs

Notius is a genus of stink bugs, first described by Willam Sweetman Dallas in 1851.

== Species ==
This genus includes the following species:

- Notius consputus Stål, 1865
- Notius depressus Dallas, 1851
- Notius melancholicus Bergroth, 1912
- Notius patulus (Walker, 1867)
- Notius posticus (Walker, 1867)
