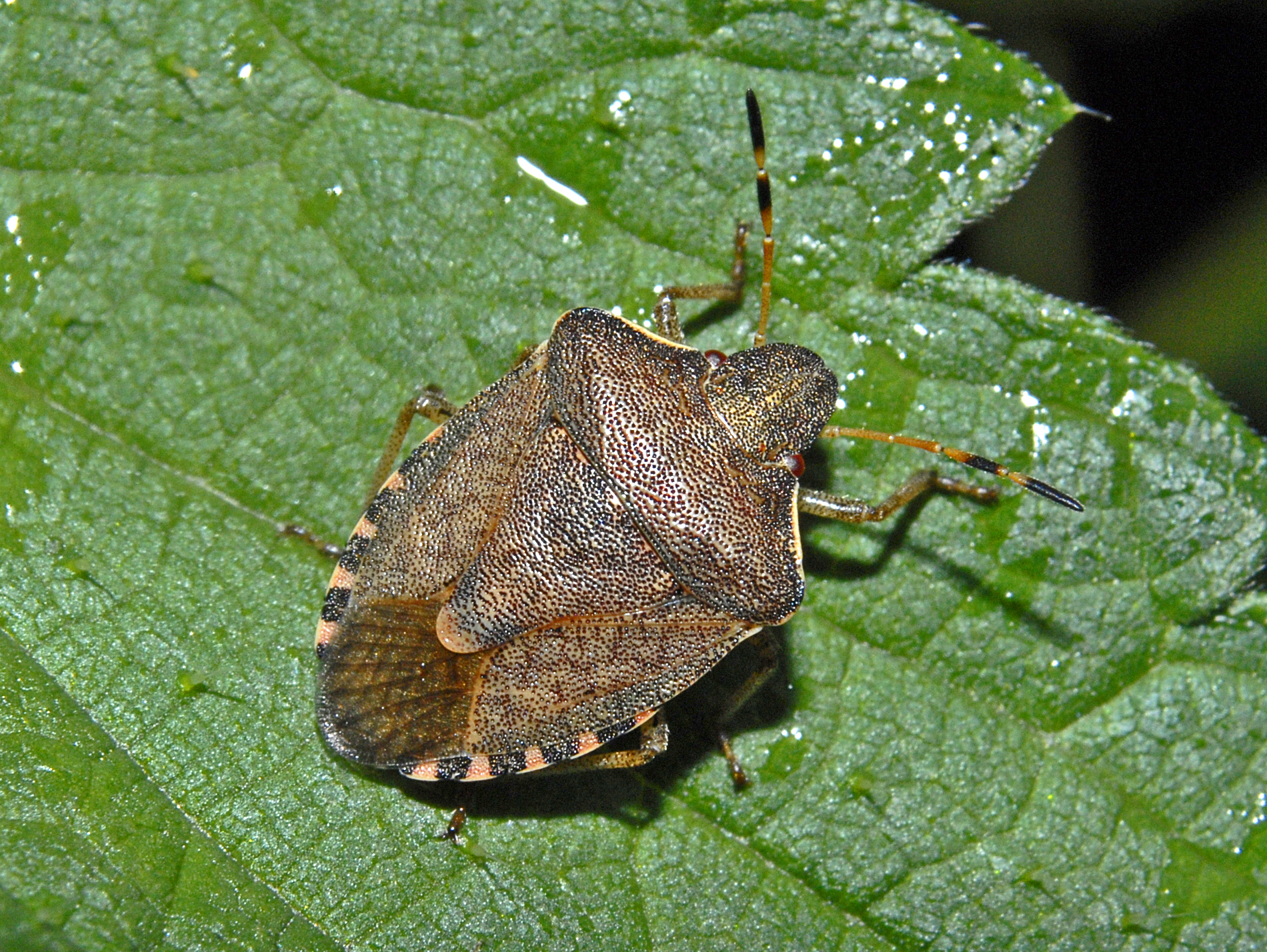
- Peribalus strictus

Scientific classification
- Kingdom: Animalia
- Phylum: Arthropoda
- Class: Insecta
- Order: Hemiptera
- Suborder: Heteroptera
- Family: Pentatomidae
- Subfamily: Pentatominae
- Tribe: Carpocorini
- Genus: Peribalus; Mulsant & Rey, 1866

= Peribalus =

Genus of true bugs

Peribalus is a genus of shield bugs in the family Pentatomidae.

== Species ==
- Peribalus congenitus Putshkov, 1965
- Peribalus inclusus (Dohrn, 1860)
- Peribalus manifestus (Kiritshenko, 1952
- Peribalus strictus (Fabricius, 1803)
