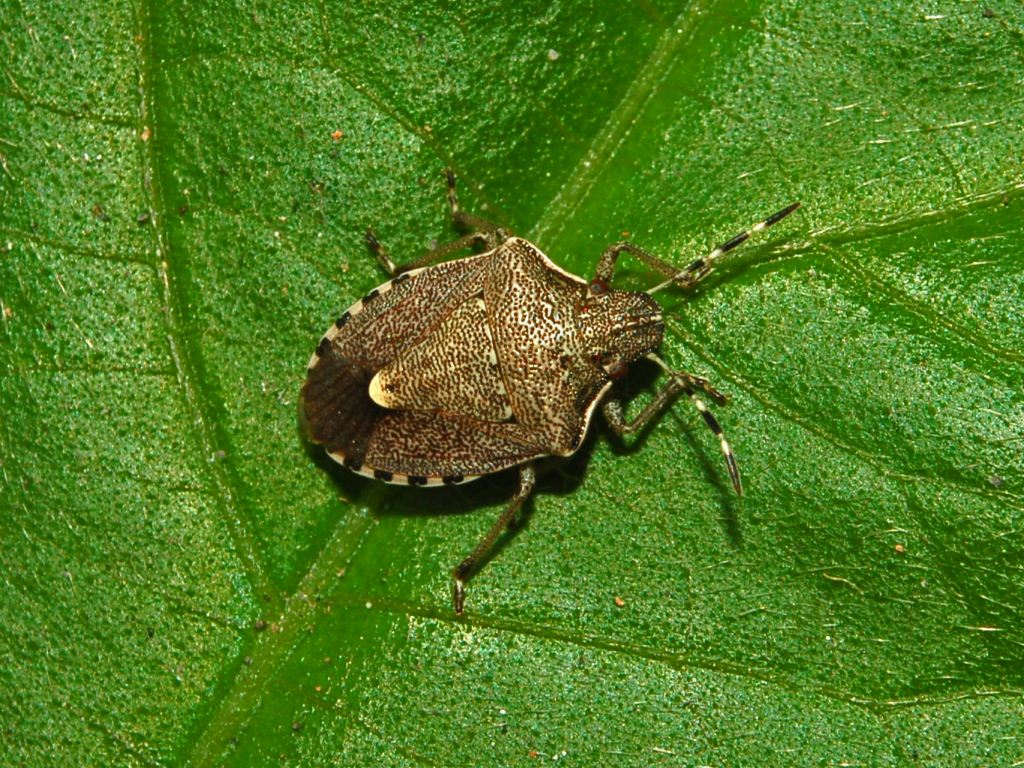

Scientific classification
- Kingdom: Animalia
- Phylum: Arthropoda
- Class: Insecta
- Order: Hemiptera
- Suborder: Heteroptera
- Family: Pentatomidae
- Genus: Holcostethus
- Species: H. albipes

Binomial name
- Holcostethus albipes (Fabricius, 1781)

= Holcostethus albipes =

Species of true bug

Holcostethus albipes is a shield bug belonging to the family Pentatomidae, subfamily Pentatominae. The species was first described by Johan Christian Fabricius in 1781.

The head is trapezoidal and the lateral margin of pronotal callus is sinuous.

It is mainly found in Austria, Slovenia, France, Greece, Italy and Spain.
