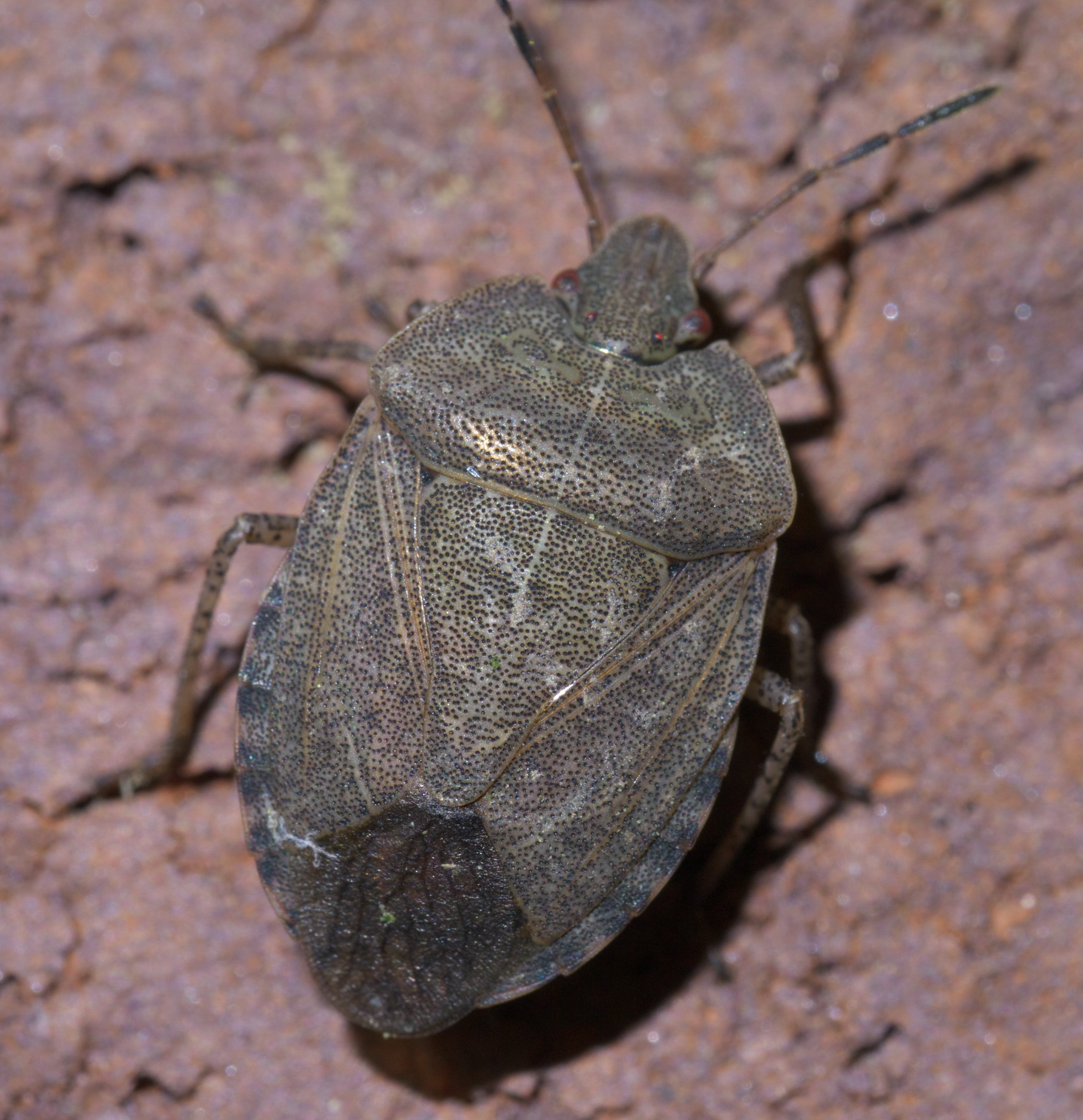

Scientific classification
- Domain: Eukaryota
- Kingdom: Animalia
- Phylum: Arthropoda
- Class: Insecta
- Order: Hemiptera
- Suborder: Heteroptera
- Family: Pentatomidae
- Genus: Menecles
- Species: M. insertus

Binomial name
- Menecles insertus (Say, 1832)

Synonyms
- Pentatoma inserta Say, 1832

= Menecles insertus =

Species of true bug

Menecles insertus is a species of stink bug in the family Pentatomidae. It is found in North America.
