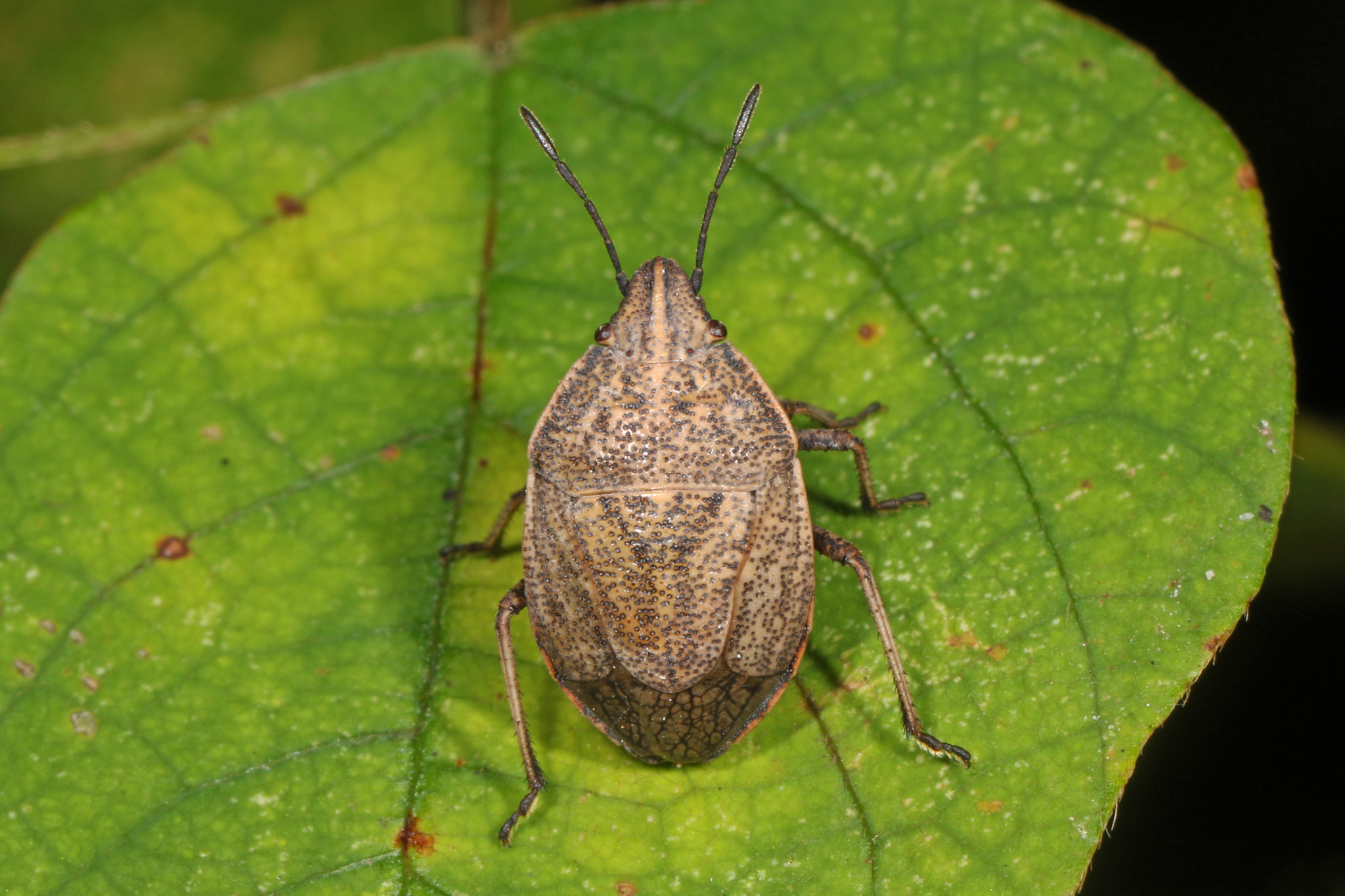
- Coenus delius

Scientific classification
- Kingdom: Animalia
- Phylum: Arthropoda
- Class: Insecta
- Order: Hemiptera
- Suborder: Heteroptera
- Family: Pentatomidae
- Tribe: Carpocorini
- Genus: Coenus; Dallas, 1851

= Coenus (bug) =

Genus of true bugs

Coenus is a genus of stink bugs in the family Pentatomidae. There are at least three described species in Coenus.

== Species ==
These three species belong to the genus Coenus:

- Coenus delius (Say, 1832)^{i c g b}
- Coenus explanatus Rider, 1996^{i c g}
- Coenus inermis Harris and Johnston, 1936^{i c g}

Data sources: i = ITIS, c = Catalogue of Life, g = GBIF, b = Bugguide.net
