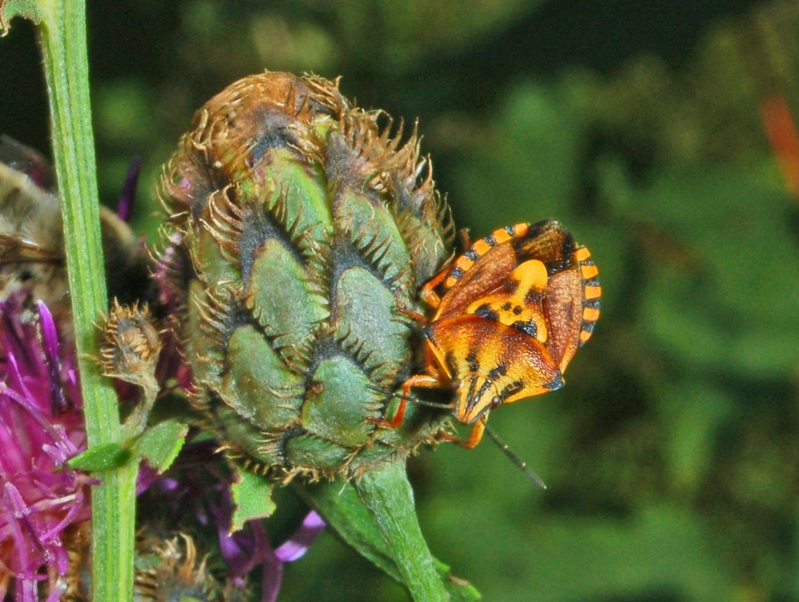
- Codophila varia

Scientific classification
- Kingdom: Animalia
- Phylum: Arthropoda
- Class: Insecta
- Order: Hemiptera
- Suborder: Heteroptera
- Family: Pentatomidae
- Tribe: Carpocorini
- Genus: Codophila; Mulsant & Rey, 1866

= Codophila =

Genus of true bugs

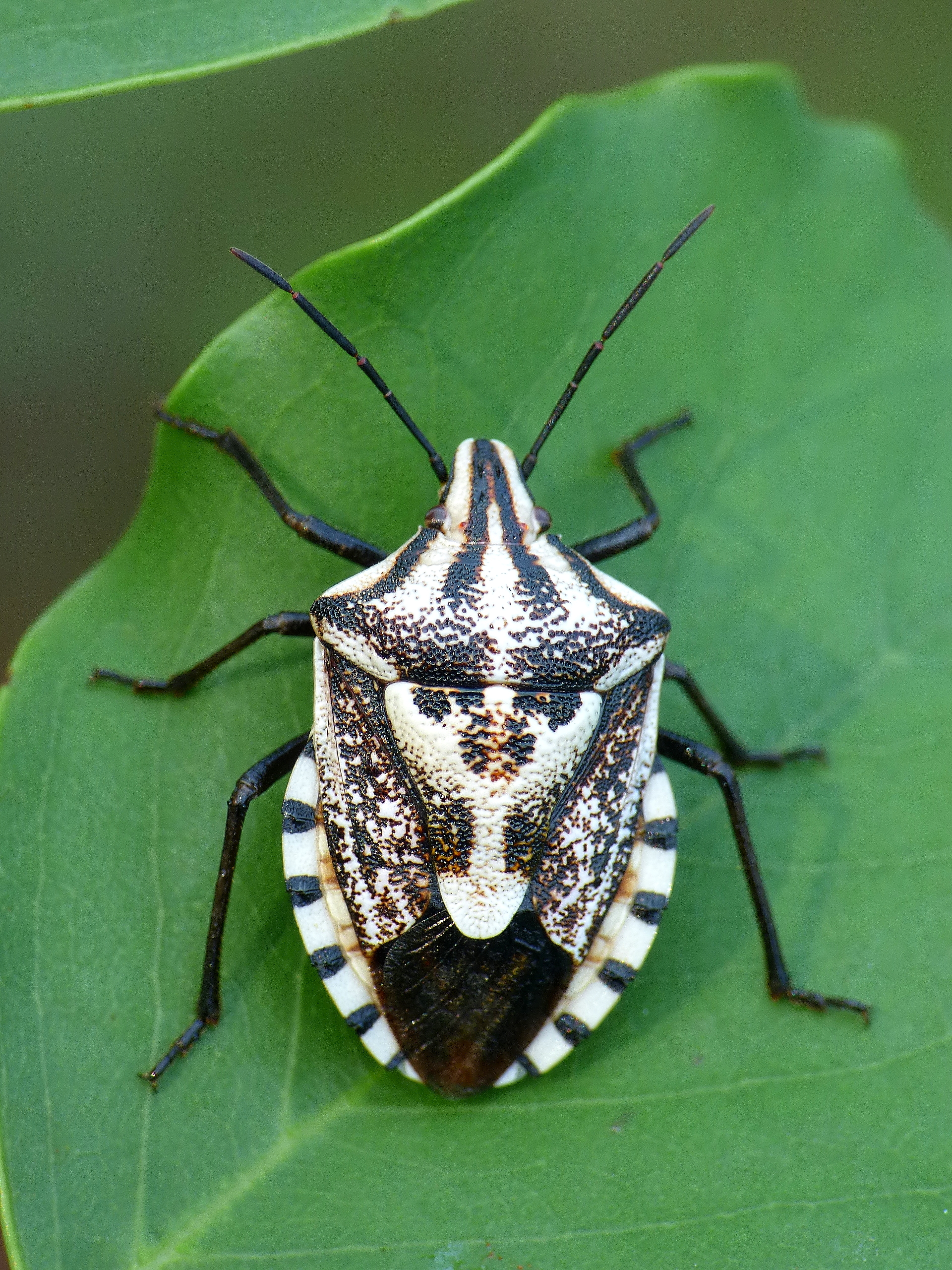
Codophila maculicollis

Codophila is a genus of 'shield bugs' belonging to the subfamily Pentatominae in the family Pentatomidae.

== Species ==
- Codophila maculicollis (Dallas, 1851)
- Codophila varia (Fabricius, 1787)
