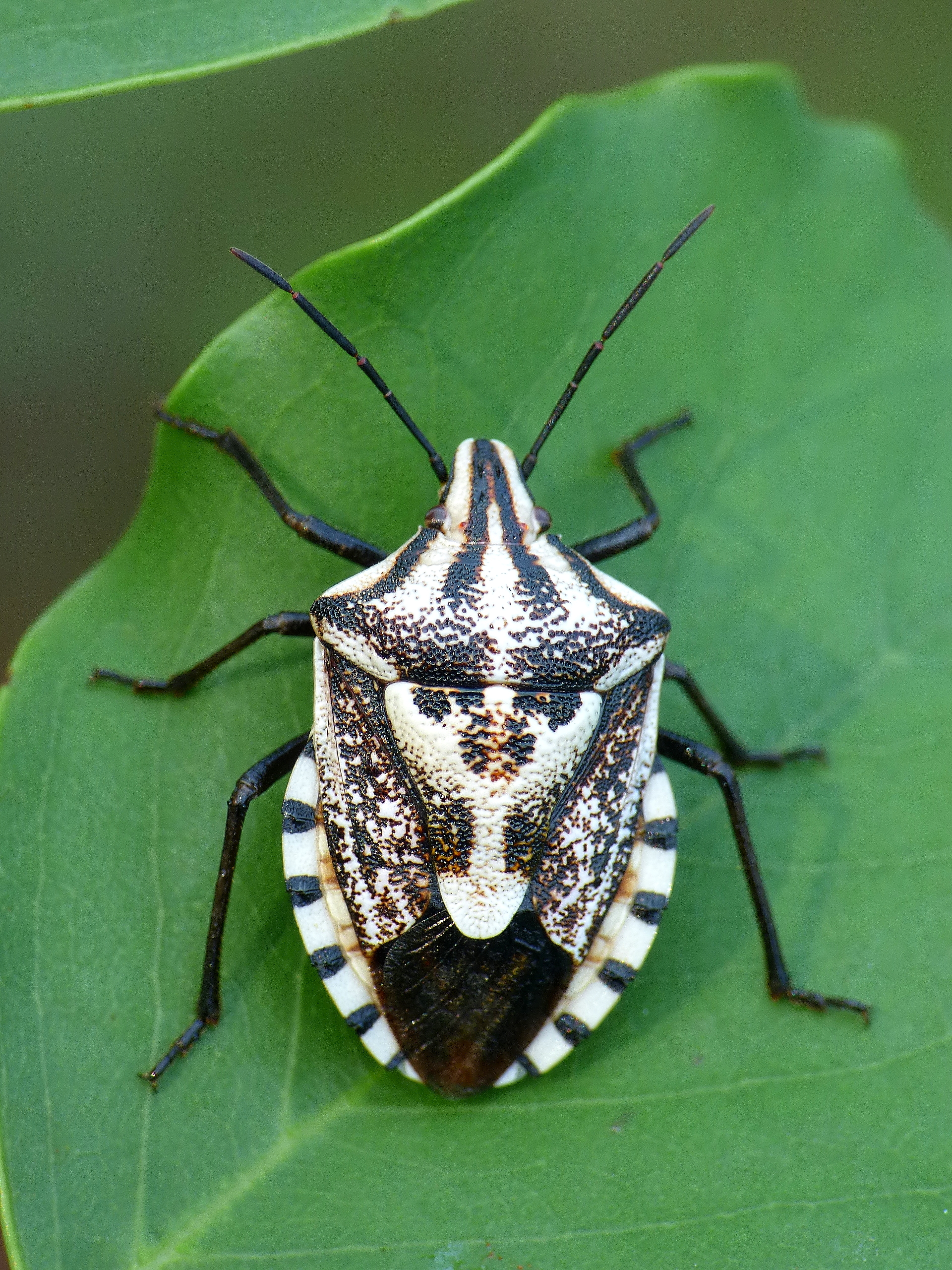

Scientific classification
- Kingdom: Animalia
- Phylum: Arthropoda
- Class: Insecta
- Order: Hemiptera
- Suborder: Heteroptera
- Family: Pentatomidae
- Genus: Codophila
- Species: C. maculicollis

Binomial name
- Codophila maculicollis (Dallas, 1851)

= Codophila maculicollis =

Species of insect

Codophila maculicollis is a species of pentatomid bug with a distribution in the arid and semi-desert zone from Africa, through the Mediterranean into India. The species has been reported from Algeria, Egypt, Libya, Tunisia, Israel, Jordan, Morocco, Syria, Turkey, Cyprus, Pakistan and India.
