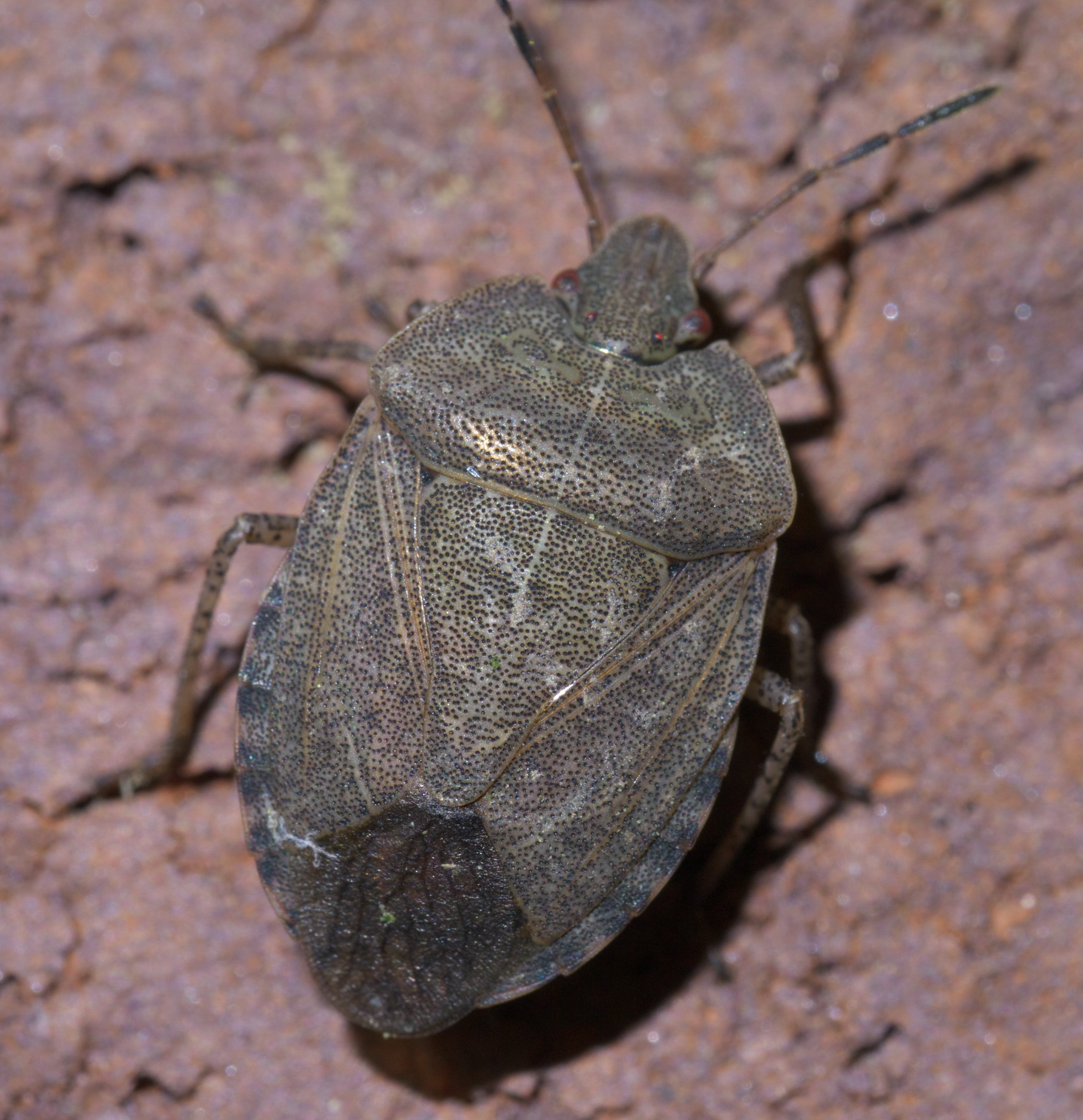
- Menecles insertus

Scientific classification
- Kingdom: Animalia
- Phylum: Arthropoda
- Clade: Pancrustacea
- Class: Insecta
- Order: Hemiptera
- Suborder: Heteroptera
- Family: Pentatomidae
- Subfamily: Pentatominae
- Tribe: Carpocorini
- Genus: Menecles; Stål, 1867

= Menecles (bug) =

Genus of true bugs

Menecles is a genus of stink bugs in the family Pentatomidae. There are at least two described species in Menecles.

== Species ==
These two species belong to the genus Menecles:

- Menecles insertus (Say, 1832)
- Menecles portacrus Rolston, 1973
