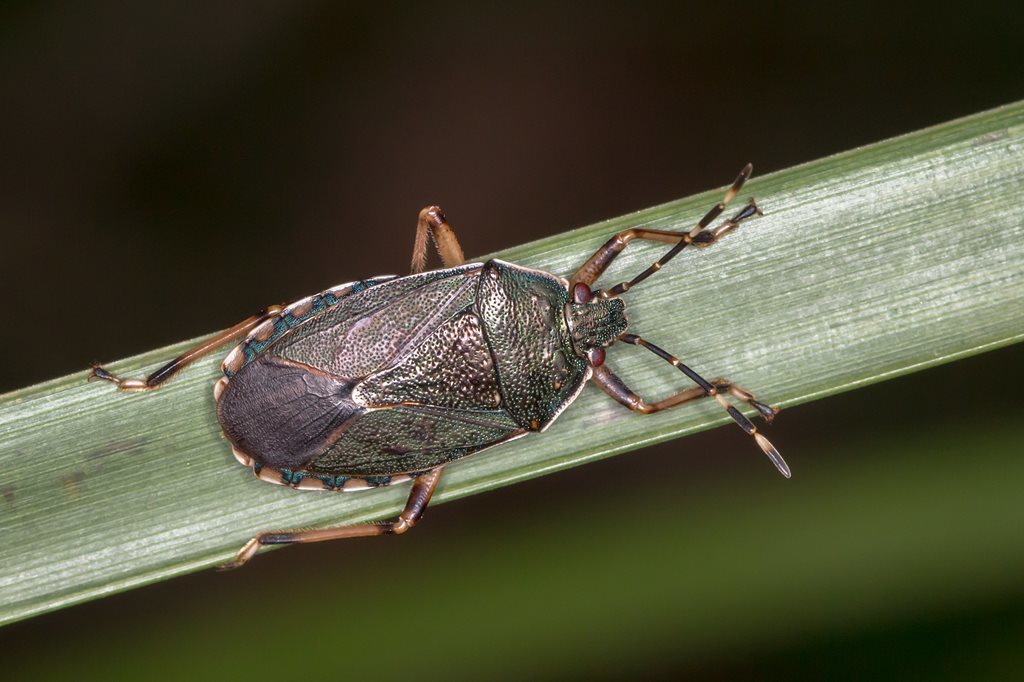

Scientific classification
- Kingdom: Animalia
- Phylum: Arthropoda
- Class: Insecta
- Order: Hemiptera
- Suborder: Heteroptera
- Family: Pentatomidae
- Genus: Notius
- Species: N. depressus

Binomial name
- Notius depressus Dallas, 1851

= Notius depressus =

Species of bug

Notius depressus is a species of bug belonging to the stink bug family (Pentatomidae), first described by William Sweetland Dallas in 1851. It is found in all states and territories of Australia with the exception of the Northern Territory.
