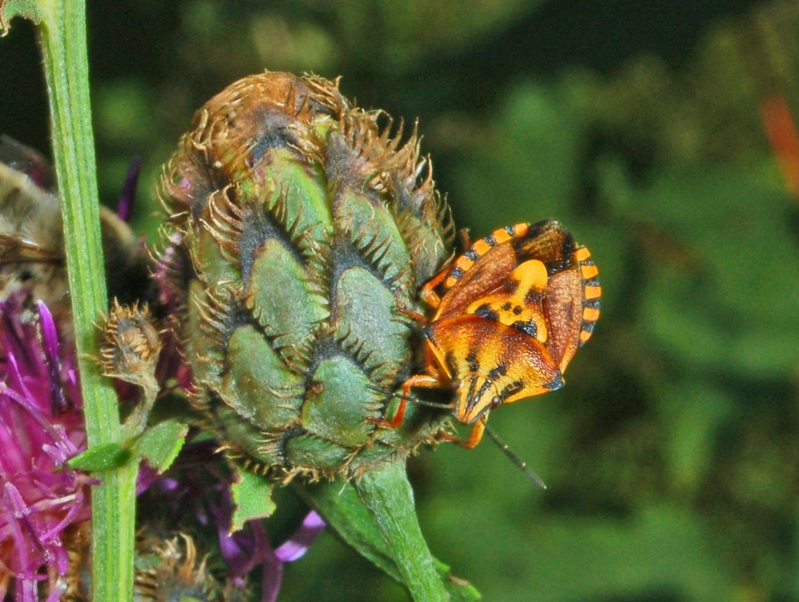
- Adult of Codophila varia

Scientific classification
- Kingdom: Animalia
- Phylum: Arthropoda
- Clade: Pancrustacea
- Class: Insecta
- Order: Hemiptera
- Suborder: Heteroptera
- Family: Pentatomidae
- Genus: Codophila
- Species: C. varia

Binomial name
- Codophila varia Fabricius, 1787

Synonyms
- Cimex varius Fabricius, 1787; Codophila varia longicornis Fuente, 1971; Codophila varia varia (Fabricius, 1787)

= Codophila varia =

Species of true bug

Codophila varia is a species of shield bug belonging to the subfamily Pentatominae in the family Pentatomidae.

== Distribution ==
This species is present around most of Europe (Albania, Bosnia and Herzegovina, Bulgaria, Croatia, Cyprus, France, Greece, Spain, North Macedonia, Malta, Moldova, Portugal, Romania, Russia, Switzerland, Turkey, Hungary and Italy).

== Description ==
The adults reach a body length of 8.7–14 millimetres (0.34–0.55 in). It is a rather variable species in size and colour. Coloration of body may be pale yellow, greyish or also blood-red. These bugs have three bright longitudinal stripes on the head. Scutellum is brightly colored with a striking black drawing. The connexivum is bright with black spots. The first three segments of the antennae are usually red, the two outer ones are black. This species is very similar to Carpocoris pudicus.

== Biology ==
These bugs can mainly be encountered from June through August. They are polyphagous, but they mainly feed on Asteraceae (especially on Echinops spinosus) and Apiaceae species.
