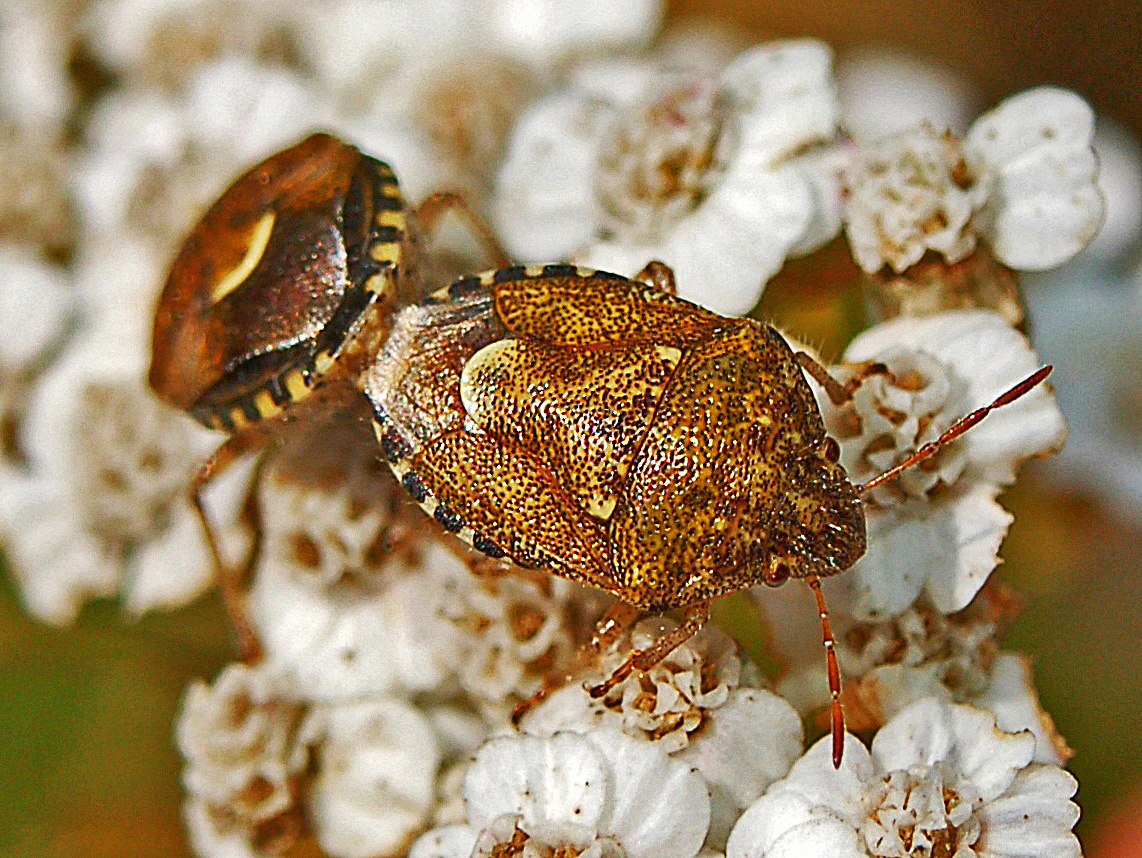
- Staria lunata. Dorsal view

Scientific classification
- Kingdom: Animalia
- Phylum: Arthropoda
- Class: Insecta
- Order: Hemiptera
- Suborder: Heteroptera
- Family: Pentatomidae
- Subfamily: Pentatominae
- Tribe: Carpocorini
- Genus: Staria; Dohrn, 1860
- Species: S. lunata

Binomial name
- Staria lunata (Hahn, 1835)

Synonyms
- Eysarcoris lunatus Hahn, 1835; Staria levantinae Fuente, 1972; Cimex lobulatus Rambur, 1839; Staria maroccana Lindberg, 1932

= Staria lunata =

Species of true bug

Staria lunata is a species of shield bug belonging to the family Pentatomidae. It is the only species of the genus Staria.

== Distribution and habitat ==
This species is present in most of Europe (Albania, Austria, Bosnia and Herzegovina, Bulgaria, Croatia, Czech Republic, European Turkey, France, Germany, Greece, Hungary, Italy, Luxembourg, Republic of North Macedonia, Moldova, Northwest European Russia, Poland, Portugal, Romania, Slovakia, Slovenia, Spain, Switzerland, Ukraine, Yugoslavia). It is widespread in the Mediterranean, but rather rare in Central Europe. They often occur in rainfed fields not far from a river.

== Description ==
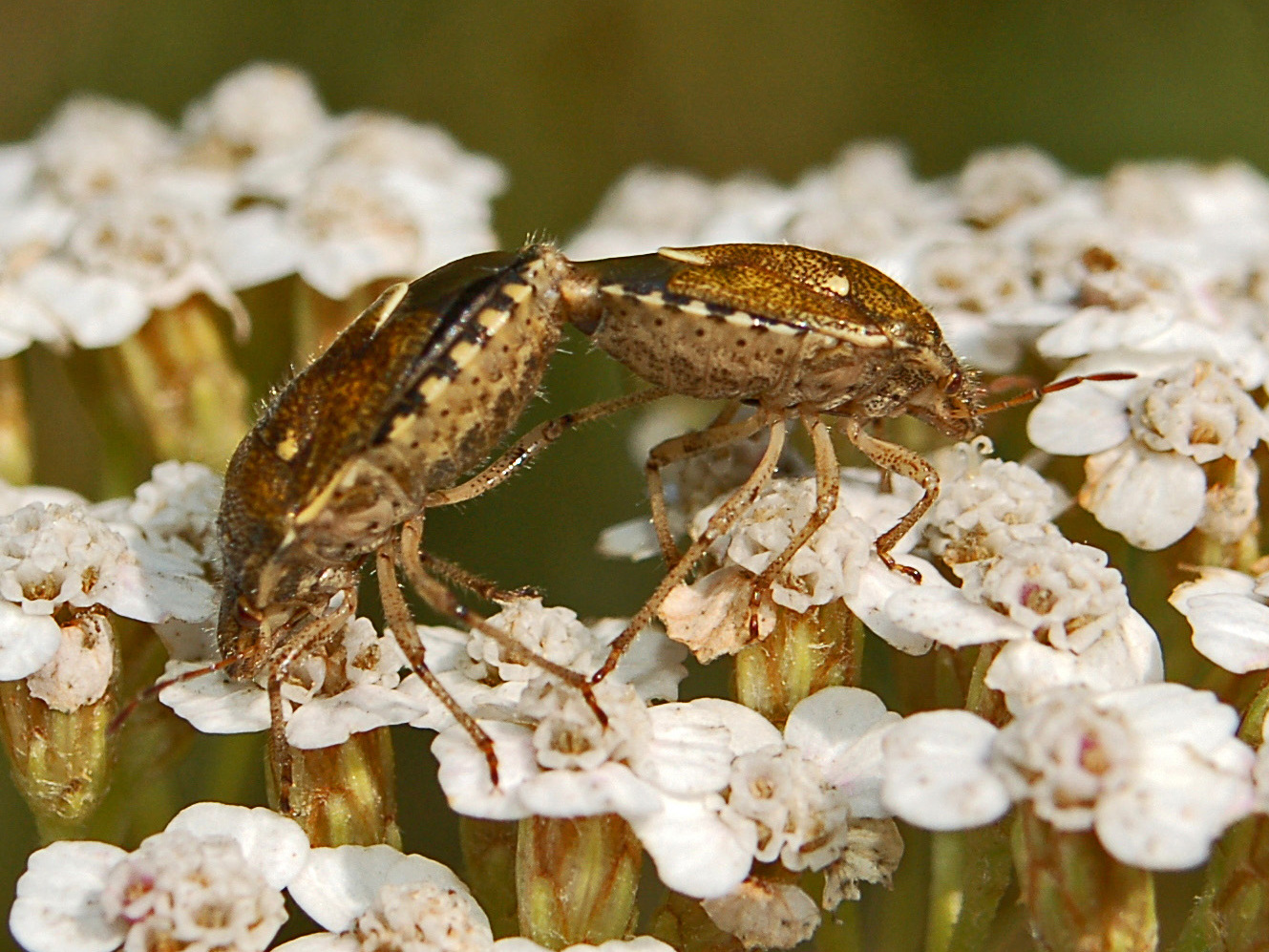
Mating couple

Staria lunata can reach a length of 7–8 millimetres (0.28–0.31 in). These shield bugs are mainly brown. Head, thorax, lateral tergites and abdomen have light erect hair. They have three bright calluses at the base of a rather rounded the scutellum, that shows at the lower end a whitish sickle shape marking.

== Biology ==
Staria lunata is polyphagous. Adults can be found from March to December. These bugs are often found on herbaceous plants, especially on wild oat (Avena fatua), Astrodaucus orientalis, noble yarrow (Achillea nobilis), Iberian knapweed (Centaurea iberica), garden yellowrocket (Barbarea vulgaris), Cistus species, ground ivy (Glechoma hederacea), Nepeta italica subsp. troodi (syn. Nepeta troodi), woodland germander (Teucrium scorodonia), Thymus species, Galium species, Scrophularia scopolii, Verbascum species.
