= Varia =

Varia (Latin: diverse, various) may refer to:

- Varia (fish), a former name of the fish genus Variichthys
- Varia (moth), a moth genus
- Varia (Xena), character on Xena: Warrior Princess
- Varia Suit, an armor expansion in the Metroid video game series
- The Varia, a fictional assassination squad in the anime/manga series Reborn!
- Varia (Cyrillic: Варя), a short form of the female name Varvara (Cyrillic: Варвара) in Russian, Bulgarian and other languages
- Varia, an alternate transliteration of βαρεῖα (bareîa, 'heavy'), a diacritic ` representing the normal or low pitch in ancient Greek
- Radu Varia (born 1940), Romanian art critic and art historian
- Vicovaro or Varia, a town in Italy
