= Staria Oyj =

Staria
- Native name: Staria Oyj
- Type: Private
- Industry: Financial services; enterprise software
- Founded: 2003; 23 years ago
- Founders: Juha Tommila; Mikko Saari
- Headquarters: Helsinki, Finland
- Area served: Europe
- Key people: Artti Aurasmaa (CEO)
- Services: Accounting; ERP consulting; payroll
- Website: www.staria.com

Staria Oyj is a Finnish financial services and enterprise software company headquartered in Helsinki, Finland. The company provides accounting, payroll, compliance, and enterprise resource planning (ERP) services for companies operating internationally.

== History ==
Staria was founded in 2003 in Helsinki by Juha Tommila and Mikko Saari.

In 2013, the company became an Oracle NetSuite provider partner and expanded its operations into ERP implementation and consulting services.

In the late 2010s, Staria expanded its software operations related to accounts payable automation and financial administration.

In 2020, Finnish private equity firm Vaaka Partners acquired a majority stake in the company.

The following year, Artti Aurasmaa was appointed chief executive officer, succeeding co-founder Juha Tommila.

In 2022, Staria acquired Visionbay Solutions Oy, a Finnish business intelligence and analytics company.

In 2023, the company acquired the Swedish consultancy Suitespot AB. Also in 2023, Staria divested its robotic process automation business to the Finnish company Sisua Digital Oy.

In 2024, the company's Staria Flow software product was acquired by Zone & Co.

== Operations ==
Staria provides financial management, payroll, accounting, compliance, ERP implementation, and analytics services for companies operating across multiple countries. Its ERP-related operations are focused primarily on Oracle NetSuite systems, including implementation, integration, and support services. Following the acquisition of Suitespot AB in 2023, Staria stated that its NetSuite-related operations included more than 300 specialists.

== Recognition ==
Staria has received several Oracle NetSuite partner awards in Europe, including the EMEA Solution Provider Partner of the Year award in 2019, 2022, and 2024.
