= Prionosoma (bug) =

Scientific classification
- Kingdom: Animalia
- Phylum: Arthropoda
- Class: Insecta
- Order: Hemiptera
- Suborder: Heteroptera
- Family: Pentatomidae
- Genus: Prionosoma; Uhler, 1863

Genus of true bugs

Prionosoma is a genus of true bugs belonging to the family Pentatomidae.

The species of this genus are found in North America.

Species:

- Prionosoma podopioides Uhler, 1863
