= Stink bug =

Stink bug may refer to:

- Any insect in the true bug (hemipteran) family Pentatomidae, generally called shield bugs or stink bugs
  - Halyomorpha halys, or brown marmorated stink bug
  - Chinavia hilaris, or green stink bug
- Any insect in the true bug (hemipteran) family Acanthosomatidae, generally called shield bugs and sometimes stink bugs
- Boisea trivittata, or boxelder bug in the true bug (hemipteran) family Rhopalidae
- Eleodes, or stink beetles, a genus in the darkling beetle family (Tenebrionidae)
- An unofficial name for the Lockheed F-117 Nighthawk

== See also ==
- Any insect in the true bug (hemipteran) family Scutelleridae, generally called jewel stink bugs
- Any insect in the true bug (hemipteran) family Tessaratomidae, generally called giant stink bugs, or inflated stink bugs
