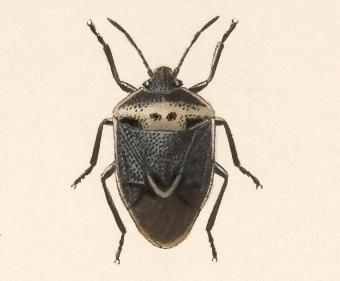
- Cosmopepla binotata

Scientific classification
- Kingdom: Animalia
- Phylum: Arthropoda
- Class: Insecta
- Order: Hemiptera
- Suborder: Heteroptera
- Family: Pentatomidae
- Subfamily: Pentatominae
- Tribe: Carpocorini

= Carpocorini =

Tribe of true bugs

Carpocorini is a tribe of stink bugs in the family Pentatomidae. There are more than 100 genera in Carpocorini.

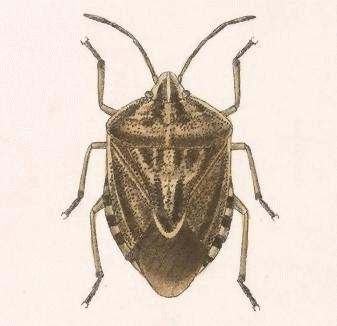
Trichopepla semivittata

== Genera ==
BioLib lists:

1. Acledra Signoret, 1864
2. Aeliavuori Rider, 2016
3. Aeliomorpha Stål, 1858
4. Agatharchus Stål, 1876
5. Agroecus Dallas, 1851
6. Allecbola Bergroth, 1921
7. Alloeoglypta Kiritshenko, 1952
8. Amauromelpia Fernandes & Grazia, 1998
9. Anaxarchus Stål, 1876
10. Andocides Stål, 1876
11. Anhanga Distant, 1887
12. Antheminia Mulsant & Rey, 1866^{g b}
13. Berecynthus Stål, 1862
14. Bonacialis Distant, 1901
15. Bucerocoris Mayr, 1866
16. Caonabo Rolston, 1974
17. Caracia Stål, 1872
18. Caribo Rolston, 1984
19. Carpocoris Kolenati, 1846
20. Chimerocoris Barros, Barão & Grazia, 2020
21. Chlorochroa Stål, 1872
22. Cnephosa Jakovlev, 1880
23. Codophila Mulsant & Rey, 1866
24. Coenus Dallas, 1851^{i c g b}
25. Copeocoris Mayr, 1866
26. Cosmopepla Stål, 1867^{i c g b}
27. Cradia Bergroth, 1918
28. Curatia Stål, 1865
29. Dichelops Spinola, 1837
30. Dolycoris Mulsant & Rey, 1866
31. Epipedus Spinola, 1837
32. Eudolycoris Tamanini, 1959
33. Eurinome Stål, 1867
34. Euschistus Dallas, 1851^{i c g b}
35. Galedanta Amyot & Serville, 1843
36. Glyphepomis Berg, 1891
37. Gomphocranum Jakovlev, 1877
38. Graphorn Faúndez, Rider, & Carvajal, 2017
39. Gulielmus Distant, 1901
40. Hegelochus Stål, 1876
41. Himalayacoris Belousova, 2007
42. Holcostethus Fieber, 1861^{i c g b}
43. Hymenarcys Amyot & Serville, 1843^{i c g b}
44. Hypanthracos Grazia & Campos, 1996
45. Hyparete Stål, 1867
46. Hypatropis Bergroth, 1891
47. Hypaulacus Spinola, 1850
48. Hypsithocus Bergroth, 1927
49. Ilipla Stål, 1865
50. Kahlamba Distant, 1906
51. Kamaliana Ahmad & Zaidi, 1989
52. Kermana Rolston & McDonald, 1981^{i c g b}
53. Ladeaschistus Rolston, 1973
54. Lattinellica Rider & Eger, 2008
55. Lattinidea Rider & Eger, 2008
56. Liicoris Zheng & Liu, 1987
57. Liscocephala Barros, Barão & Grazia, 2020
58. Lojus McDonald, 1982
59. Lubentius Stål, 1867
60. Luridocimex Grazia, Fernandes & Schwertner, 1998
61. Macromolus Dallas, 1851
62. Manoriana Ahmad & Kamaluddin, 1978
63. Mathiolus Distant, 1889
64. Mecocephala Dallas, 1851
65. Menecles Stål, 1867^{i c g b}
66. Menudo Thomas, 1990
67. Mimula Jakovlev, 1889
68. Monteithiella Gross, 1976
69. Mormidea Amyot & Serville, 1843^{i c g b}
70. Mormidella Horváth, 1889
71. Moromorpha Rolston, 1978^{i c g b}
72. Mycoolona Distant, 1910
73. Neomazium Distant, 1910
74. Notius Dallas, 1851
75. Ochyrotylus Jakovlev, 1885
76. Oebalus Stål, 1862^{i c g b}
77. Oenopiella Bergroth, 1891
78. Ogmocoris Mayr, 1864
79. Oncinoproctus Breddin, 1904
80. Padaeus Stål, 1862
81. Parahypatropis Grazia & Fernandes, 1996
82. Paramecocephala Benvegnú, 1968
83. Paratibraca Campos & Grazia, 1995
84. Parentheca Berg, 1891
85. Pedinonotus Fernandes & Grazia, 2002
86. Pentatomiana Grazia & Barcellos, 2004
87. Peribalus Mulsant & Rey, 1866
88. Poriptus Stål, 1861
89. Prionosoma Uhler, 1863^{g b}
90. Prionotocoris Kormilev, 1955
91. Proxys Spinola, 1840^{i c g b}
92. Pseudapines Bergroth, 1912
93. Rhombocoris Mayr, 1864
94. Risibia Horváth, 1888
95. Rubiconia Dohrn, 1860
96. Sibaria Stål, 1872
97. Spinalanx Rolston & Rider, 1988
98. Staria Dohrn, 1860 - monotypic - Staria lunata (Hahn, 1835)
99. Steleocoris Mayr, 1864
100. Stysiana Grazia, Fernandes & Schwertner, 1999
101. Theloris Stål, 1865
102. Thestral Faúndez & Rider, 2014
103. Tibraca Stål, 1860
104. Trichopepla Stål, 1867^{i c g b}
105. Triunfus Barros, Barão & Grazia, 2020

Data sources: i = ITIS, c = Catalogue of Life, g = GBIF, b = Bugguide.net
