= List of Limnophila species =

This is a list of 282 species in Limnophila, a genus of limoniid crane flies in the family Limoniidae.

== Limnophila species ==
- Limnophila abstrusa Alexander, 1929^{c g}
- Limnophila acuspinosa Alexander, 1931^{c g}
- Limnophila adicia Alexander, 1964^{c g}
- Limnophila adusta Osten Sacken, 1859^{i}
- Limnophila adustoides Alexander, 1927^{i}
- Limnophila aequiatra Alexander, 1949^{i}
- Limnophila albipes Leonard, 1913^{i}
- Limnophila albomanicata (Alexander, 1945)^{c g}
- Limnophila aldrichi Alexander, 1927^{i}
- Limnophila aleator Alexander, 1945^{i}
- Limnophila aleutica Alexander, 1920^{i}
- Limnophila alleni Johnson, 1909^{i}
- Limnophila allosoma Speiser, 1908^{c g}
- Limnophila alpica Alexander, 1929^{c g}
- Limnophila amabilis Alexander, 1950^{i}
- Limnophila angularis Alexander, 1929^{c g}
- Limnophila angusticellula Alexander, 1931^{c g}
- Limnophila angustilineata Alexander, 1926^{c g}
- Limnophila angustior Alexander, 1919^{i}
- Limnophila angustula Alexander, 1929^{i b}
- Limnophila antennata Coquillett, 1905^{i}
- Limnophila antennella Alexander, 1929^{c g}
- Limnophila apiculata Alexander, 1919^{i}
- Limnophila aprilina Osten Sacken, 1859^{i}
- Limnophila araucania Alexander, 1928^{c g}
- Limnophila arnoudi Theowald, 1971^{c g}
- Limnophila aureola Skuse, 1890^{c g}
- Limnophila auripennis Alexander, 1926^{i}
- Limnophila austroalpina Alexander, 1929^{c g}
- Limnophila barberi Alexander, 1916^{i}
- Limnophila basalis (Walker, 1856)^{c g}
- Limnophila bathrogramma Alexander, 1929^{c g}
- Limnophila benguetana Alexander, 1931^{c g}
- Limnophila bifida Alexander, 1921^{i}
- Limnophila bigladia Alexander, 1945^{i c g}
- Limnophila biterminata (Walker, 1856)^{i g}
- Limnophila bituminosa Alexander, 1931^{c g}
- Limnophila bivittata Edwards, 1928^{c g}
- Limnophila bogongensis Alexander, 1929^{c g}
- Limnophila boharti Alexander, 1943^{i}
- Limnophila borchi Alexander, 1929^{c g}
- Limnophila brachyptera Alexander, 1931^{c g}
- Limnophila brevifilosa Alexander, 1959^{i}
- Limnophila brevifurca Osten Sacken, 1859^{i}
- Limnophila breviterebra Alexander, 1965^{c g}
- Limnophila brunneistigma Alexander, 1931^{c g}
- Limnophila bryanti Alexander, 1927^{i c g}
- Limnophila bryobia Mik, 1881^{c g}
- Limnophila buangensis Alexander, 1933^{c g}
- Limnophila burdicki Alexander, 1964^{i}
- Limnophila byersi Alexander, 1973^{i c g}
- Limnophila campbelliana Alexander, 1932^{c g}
- Limnophila cancellata Alexander, 1962^{c g}
- Limnophila canifrons Edwards, 1932^{c}
- Limnophila carteri Alexander, 1922^{c g}
- Limnophila casta Alexander, 1928^{c g}
- Limnophila caudifera Alexander, 1927^{i g}
- Limnophila celestissima (Alexander, 1945)^{c g}
- Limnophila charis Alexander, 1955^{c g}
- Limnophila charon Alexander, 1937^{c g}
- Limnophila cherokeensis Alexander, 1940^{i}
- Limnophila chilensis Blanchard, 1852^{c}
- Limnophila chinggiskhani Podenas and Gelhaus, 2001^{c g}
- Limnophila cingulipes Alexander, 1928^{c g}
- Limnophila circumscripta Alexander, 1934^{c g}
- Limnophila claggi Alexander, 1930^{i c g}
- Limnophila clavigera Alexander, 1934^{c g}
- Limnophila colophallus Alexander, 1967^{c g}
- Limnophila columbiana Alexander, 1927^{i}
- Limnophila consimilis Deitz, 1921^{i g}
- Limnophila costata Coquillett, 1901^{i}
- Limnophila crepuscula Wood, 1952^{c g}
- Limnophila cressoni Alexander, 1917^{i}
- Limnophila decasbila (Wiedemann, 1828)^{c}
- Limnophila defecta Alexander, 1929^{c g}
- Limnophila dictyoptera Alexander, 1922^{c g}
- Limnophila difficilis Alexander, 1920^{c g}
- Limnophila disposita Skuse, 1890^{c g}
- Limnophila dorrigana Alexander, 1933^{c g}
- Limnophila dravidica Alexander, 1971^{c g}
- Limnophila edentata Alexander, 1919^{i}
- Limnophila edita Alexander, 1928^{c g}
- Limnophila effeta Alexander, 1922^{c g}
- Limnophila egena Alexander, 1928^{c g}
- Limnophila electa (Alexander, 1924)^{c g}
- Limnophila emmelina Alexander, 1914^{i c g}
- Limnophila epimicta Alexander, 1927^{i}
- Limnophila eutheta Alexander, 1936^{c g}
- Limnophila euxesta Alexander, 1924^{i c g}
- Limnophila expressa Alexander, 1937^{c g}
- Limnophila fasciolata Osten Sacken, 1869^{i}
- Limnophila filiformis Alexander, 1929^{c g}
- Limnophila flavapila Doane, 1900^{i}
- Limnophila flavicauda (Bigot, 1888)^{c}
- Limnophila flavissima Alexander, 1960^{c g}
- Limnophila fratria Osten Sacken, 1869^{i}
- Limnophila freeborni Alexander, 1943^{i}
- Limnophila frosti Alexander, 1961^{i}
- Limnophila fumidicosta Alexander, 1927^{i}
- Limnophila fundata Alexander, 1928^{c g}
- Limnophila fuscovaria Osten Sacken, 1859^{i b}
- Limnophila fuscovenosa (Alexander, 1927)^{i g}
- Limnophila galactopoda Alexander, 1943^{i c}
- Limnophila globulifera Alexander, 1941^{i}
- Limnophila grandidieri Alexander, 1920^{c g}
- Limnophila gruiformis Alexander, 1945^{i}
- Limnophila guttulatissima Alexander, 1913^{c g}
- Limnophila hemmingseniana (Alexander, 1978)^{c g}
- Limnophila hepatica Alexander, 1919^{i}
- Limnophila hilli Alexander, 1929^{c g}
- Limnophila hoffmanniana Alexander, 1938^{c g}
- Limnophila humidicola Alexander, 1929^{c g}
- Limnophila imitatrix Skuse, 1890^{c g}
- Limnophila implicita Alexander, 1929^{c g}
- Limnophila inculta Alexander, 1929^{c g}
- Limnophila indistincta Doane, 1900^{i}
- Limnophila inordinata Skuse, 1890^{c g}
- Limnophila insularis Johnson, 1913^{i}
- Limnophila intonsa Alexander, 1928^{c g}
- Limnophila iota Alexander, 1964^{c g}
- Limnophila iotoides Alexander, 1968^{c g}
- Limnophila iowensis Alexander, 1927^{i g}
- Limnophila irene Alexander, 1927^{i}
- Limnophila irrorata Johnson, 1909^{i}
- Limnophila japonica Alexander, 1913^{c g}
- Limnophila johnsoni Alexander, 1914^{i}
- Limnophila jordanica Alexander, 1949^{c g}
- Limnophila jucunda Alexander, 1928^{c g}
- Limnophila kaieturana Alexander, 1930^{c g}
- Limnophila kershawi Alexander, 1928^{c g}
- Limnophila kerteszi Alexander, 1914^{c g}
- Limnophila laricicola Alexander, 1912^{i c g}
- Limnophila latistyla Alexander, 1923^{c g}
- Limnophila lepida Alexander, 1928^{c g}
- Limnophila leucostigma Alexander, 1937^{c g}
- Limnophila levidensis Skuse, 1890^{c g}
- Limnophila litigiosa Alexander, 1928^{c g}
- Limnophila lloydi Alexander, 1913^{c g}
- Limnophila lobifera Alexander, 1955^{i c g}
- Limnophila longicellula Alexander, 1931^{c g}
- Limnophila luctuosa Skuse, 1890^{c g}
- Limnophila lutea Doane, 1900^{i}
- Limnophila luteicauda Alexander, 1924^{c g}
- Limnophila luteifemorata Alexander, 1963^{c g}
- Limnophila luteola Alexander, 1927^{i}
- Limnophila macrocera (Say, 1823)^{i c g b}
- Limnophila madida Alexander, 1928^{c g}
- Limnophila magdalena Dietz, 1920^{i g}
- Limnophila malagasya Alexander, 1920^{c g}
- Limnophila malitiosa (Alexander, 1951)^{c}
- Limnophila manipurensis Alexander, 1942^{c g}
- Limnophila marchandi Alexander, 1916^{i b}
- Limnophila martynovi Alexander, 1933^{c g}
- Limnophila mcclureana Alexander, 1938^{i}
- Limnophila mcdunnoughi Alexander, 1926^{i c g}
- Limnophila melica Alexander, 1929^{c g}
- Limnophila micromera Alexander, 1979^{c g}
- Limnophila microphallus Alexander, 1927^{i}
- Limnophila micropriapus Alexander, 1981^{c}
- Limnophila mira Alexander, 1926^{c g}
- Limnophila mirabunda Alexander, 1928^{c g}
- Limnophila miroides Alexander, 1932^{c g}
- Limnophila mitocera Alexander, 1929^{c g}
- Limnophila mitoceroides Alexander, 1933^{c g}
- Limnophila modoc Alexander, 1946^{i}
- Limnophila morosa Alexander, 1928^{c g}
- Limnophila morula Alexander, 1928^{c g}
- Limnophila munda Osten Sacken, 1869^{i}
- Limnophila mundoides Alexander, 1916^{i}
- Limnophila neadusta Alexander, 1927^{i}
- Limnophila nearctica Alexander, 1966^{i}
- Limnophila nebulicola Alexander, 1929^{c g}
- Limnophila nebulifera Alexander, 1923^{c g}
- Limnophila nematocera (Alexander, 1939)^{c g}
- Limnophila nemorivaga Alexander, 1929^{c g}
- Limnophila nevadensis Alexander, 1958^{i}
- Limnophila nigrofemorata Alexander, 1927^{i c}
- Limnophila nigrogeniculata Alexander, 1926^{i}
- Limnophila nitidiceps Alexander, 1928^{c g}
- Limnophila niveitarsis Osten Sacken, 1869^{i}
- Limnophila nixor Alexander, 1965^{c g}
- Limnophila nocticolor Alexander, 1929^{c g}
- Limnophila novaeangliae Alexander, 1914^{i}
- Limnophila novella Alexander, 1928^{c g}
- Limnophila nox Alexander, 1921^{c g}
- Limnophila nupta Alexander, 1947^{i}
- Limnophila nycteris Alexander, 1943^{i c g}
- Limnophila obscura Riedel, 1914^{c g}
- Limnophila obscuripennis Skuse, 1890^{c g}
- Limnophila occidens Alexander, 1924^{i}
- Limnophila ocellata Skuse, 1890^{c g}
- Limnophila oiticicai Alexander, 1948^{c g}
- Limnophila oliveri Alexander, 1923^{c g}
- Limnophila olympica Alexander, 1949^{i}
- Limnophila oregonensis Alexander, 1940^{i}
- Limnophila osceola Alexander, 1927^{i}
- Limnophila otwayensis Alexander, 1934^{c g}
- Limnophila pacalis Alexander, 1949^{i}
- Limnophila paeneadusta Alexander, 1961^{i}
- Limnophila pallidistyla Alexander, 1934^{c g}
- Limnophila paramunda Alexander, 1949^{i}
- Limnophila pauciseta Alexander, 1924^{c g}
- Limnophila pectinifera Alexander, 1964^{c}
- Limnophila penana Alexander, 1967^{c g}
- Limnophila pergracilis Alexander, 1943^{c g}
- Limnophila perscita Alexander, 1926^{c g}
- Limnophila persimilis Alexander, 1927^{i g}
- Limnophila phorophragma Alexander, 1944^{i}
- Limnophila pictipennis (Meigen, 1818)^{c g}
- Limnophila pilosipennis Alexander, 1922^{c g}
- Limnophila platyna Alexander, 1952^{c g}
- Limnophila platyphallus Alexander, 1926^{i}
- Limnophila poetica Osten Sacken, 1869^{i c g}
- Limnophila politissima Alexander, 1941^{i}
- Limnophila politostriata Alexander, 1934^{c g}
- Limnophila polymoroides Alexander, 1929^{c g}
- Limnophila procella Alexander, 1944^{c g}
- Limnophila pullipes Alexander, 1938^{c g}
- Limnophila quaesita Alexander, 1923^{c g}
- Limnophila recedens Alexander, 1931^{c g}
- Limnophila recta Alexander, 1928^{c g}
- Limnophila referta Alexander, 1928^{c g}
- Limnophila reniformis Alexander, 1934^{c g}
- Limnophila roraima Alexander, 1931^{c g}
- Limnophila roraimicola Alexander, 1931^{c g}
- Limnophila rubecula Alexander, 1944^{c g}
- Limnophila rubida Alexander, 1924^{i c g}
- Limnophila rudimentis Alexander, 1941^{i}
- Limnophila rufibasis (Osten Sacken)^{i g b}
- Limnophila sabrina Alexander, 1929^{i}
- Limnophila schadei Alexander, 1926^{c g}
- Limnophila schranki Oosterbroek, 1992^{c g}
- Limnophila scitula Alexander, 1926^{c g}
- Limnophila semifacta Alexander, 1948^{i}
- Limnophila sequoiarum Alexander, 1943^{i}
- Limnophila serena Alexander, 1928^{c g}
- Limnophila serotinella Alexander, 1926^{i}
- Limnophila seticellula Alexander, 1938^{i}
- Limnophila shannoni Alexander, 1921^{i}
- Limnophila shikokuensis Alexander, 1953^{c g}
- Limnophila sikorai Alexander, 1921^{c g}
- Limnophila similis Alexander, 1911^{i}
- Limnophila simplex Alexander, 1911^{i}
- Limnophila siouana Alexander, 1929^{i}
- Limnophila snoqualmiensis Alexander, 1945^{i}
- Limnophila soldatovi Alexander, 1934^{c g}
- Limnophila solstitialis Alexander, 1926^{i}
- Limnophila spinulosa Alexander, 1946^{c g}
- Limnophila stuckenbergiana Alexander, 1965^{c g}
- Limnophila stupkai Alexander, 1940^{i}
- Limnophila subapterogyne Alexander, 1928^{c g}
- Limnophila subcostata (Alexander, 1911)^{i c g}
- Limnophila subcylindrica Alexander, 1928^{c g}
- Limnophila subguttularis Alexander, 1932^{c g}
- Limnophila subjucunda Alexander, 1928^{c g}
- Limnophila subpilosa Edwards, 1928^{c}
- Limnophila subsimilis Alexander, 1927^{i}
- Limnophila subtenuicornis (Alexander, 1918)^{i c g}
- Limnophila subtristis Alexander, 1928^{c g}
- Limnophila superlineata Doane, 1900^{i}
- Limnophila suspecta Alexander, 1928^{c g}
- Limnophila tasioceroides Alexander, 1933^{c g}
- Limnophila tenuicornis Osten Sacken, 1869^{i c g}
- Limnophila tepida Alexander, 1926^{i}
- Limnophila terebrans Alexander, 1916^{i}
- Limnophila terraenovae Alexander, 1916^{i}
- Limnophila tetonicola Alexander, 1945^{i c g}
- Limnophila theresiae Alexander, 1945^{c g}
- Limnophila tigriventris Alexander, 1928^{c g}
- Limnophila tonnoiri Alexander, 1926^{c g}
- Limnophila undulata Bellardi, 1862^{i c g}
- Limnophila unispinifera Alexander, 1955^{c g}
- Limnophila vancouverensis Alexander, 1943^{i}
- Limnophila varicornis Coquillett, 1898^{c g}
- Limnophila velitor Alexander, 1951^{c g}
- Limnophila vera Alexander, 1933^{c g}
- Limnophila vernata Alexander, 1927^{i}
- Limnophila vicaria (Walker, 1835)^{c g}
- Limnophila walleyi Alexander, 1929^{i}
- Limnophila wolffhuegeli Alexander, 1940^{c g}
- Limnophila woodgatei Alexander, 1946^{i}
- Limnophila woodiana Alexander, 1964^{c g}

Data sources: i = ITIS, c = Catalogue of Life, g = GBIF, b = Bugguide.net
