= L. japonica =

L. japonica may refer to:

- Laminaria japonica, a marine species of brown algae
- Leptanilla japonica, an ant species in the genus Leptanilla
- Limnophila japonica, a crane fly species in the genus Limnophila
- Lipoptena japonica, a louse fly species in the genus Lipoptena
- Lonchoptera japonica, a spear-winged fly species in the genus Lonchoptera
- Lonicera japonica, the Japanese honeysuckle or suikazura, a flowering plant species native to eastern Asia
- Luehdorfia japonica, the Japanese luehdorfia, a butterfly species found in Japan and China

== See also ==
- Japonica (disambiguation)
