= A. silvestrii =

A. silvestrii may refer to:

- Acromyrmex silvestrii, Emery, 1905, a New World ant species in the genus Acromyrmex
- Acropyga silvestrii, Emery, 1915, an ant species in the genus Acropyga
- Aenictus silvestrii, Wheeler, 1929, an ant species in the genus Aenictus
- Amblyopone silvestrii, the Dracula ant, an ant species in the genus Amblyopone
- Amphisbaena silvestrii, a worm lizard species found in Brazil
- Apopyllus silvestrii, a spider species found in Peru, Bolivia, Brazil, Argentina and Chile
- Argulus silvestrii, a carp louse, a parasitic crustacean species

== See also ==
- Silvestrii (disambiguation)
