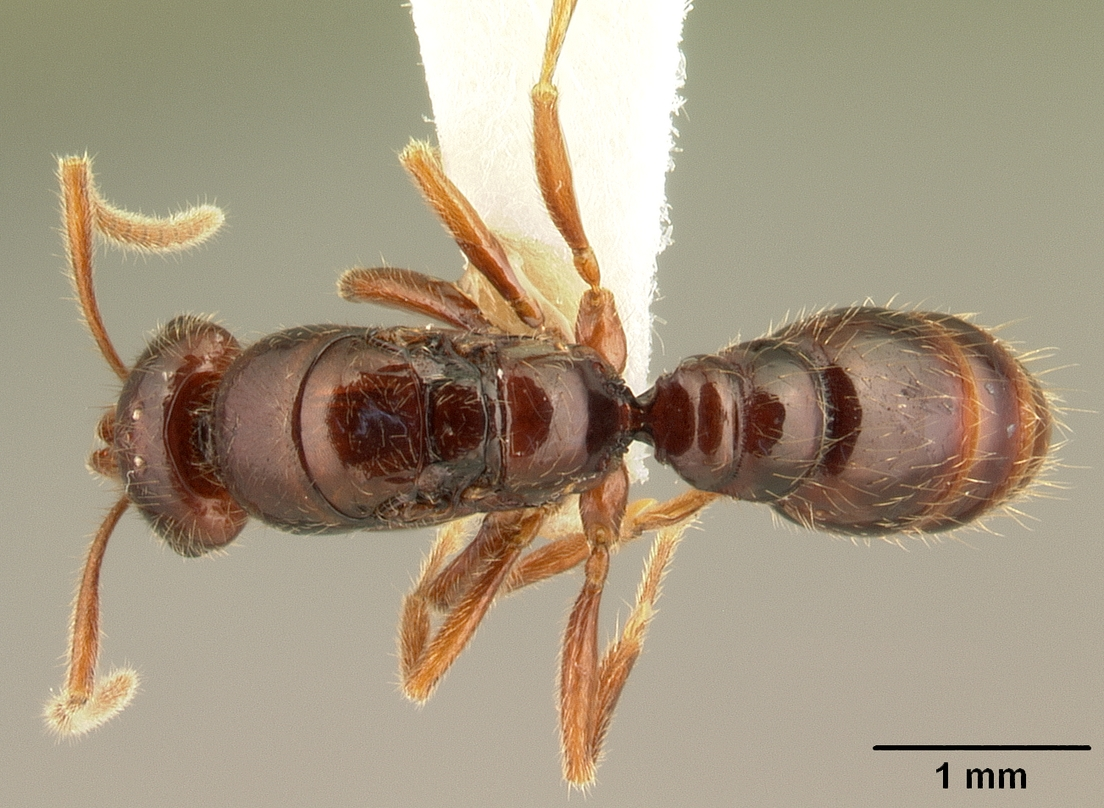
- Anomalomyrma taylori dealate queen (holotype specimen)

Scientific classification
- Domain: Eukaryota
- Kingdom: Animalia
- Phylum: Arthropoda
- Class: Insecta
- Order: Hymenoptera
- Family: Formicidae
- Subfamily: Leptanillinae
- Tribe: Anomalomyrmini; Bolton, 1990

Type genus
- Anomalomyrma

Diversity
- c. 3 genera

= Anomalomyrmini =

Tribe of ants

Anomalomyrmini is a tribe of Leptanillinae ants with three extant genera.

== Genera ==
- Anomalomyrma Taylor, 1990
- Furcotanilla Xu, 2012
- Protanilla Taylor, 1990
