= Leptanilla anomala =

Scientific classification
- Domain: Eukaryota
- Kingdom: Animalia
- Phylum: Arthropoda
- Class: Insecta
- Order: Hymenoptera
- Family: Formicidae
- Subfamily: Leptanillinae
- Tribe: Leptanillini
- Genus: Leptanilla
- Species: L. anomala

Binomial name
- Leptanilla anomala (Brues, 1925)

Genus of ants

Leptanilla anomala, formerly Scyphodon anomalum, is a species of ant first collected in Sumatra.
