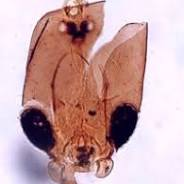

Scientific classification
- Kingdom: Animalia
- Phylum: Arthropoda
- Class: Insecta
- Order: Hymenoptera
- Family: Formicidae
- Subfamily: Leptanillinae
- Tribe: Leptanillini
- Genus: Leptanilla
- Species: L. africana

Binomial name
- Leptanilla africana Baroni Urbani, 1977

= Leptanilla africana =

Species of ants

Leptanilla africana is a species of ant belonging to the subfamily Leptanillinae. It is found only in Nigeria.
