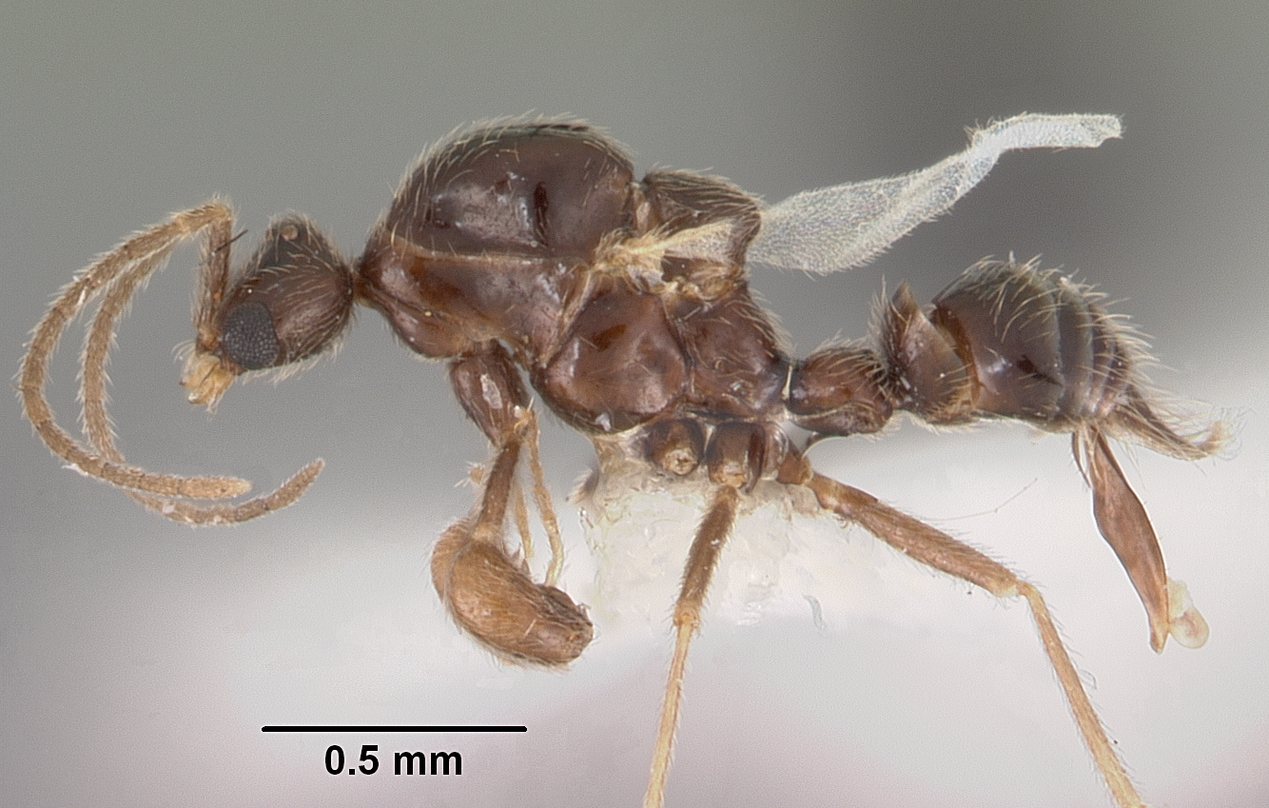
- L. copiosa male specimen

Scientific classification
- Domain: Eukaryota
- Kingdom: Animalia
- Phylum: Arthropoda
- Class: Insecta
- Order: Hymenoptera
- Family: Formicidae
- Genus: Leptanilla
- Species: L. copiosa

Binomial name
- Leptanilla copiosa Petersen, 1968

= Leptanilla copiosa =

Genus of ants

Leptanilla copiosa is a species of ant in the subfamily Leptanillinae, first described by Petersen in 1968 as Noonilla copiosa based on a male specimen from the Philippines. Noonilla was initially placed in the subfamily Leptanillinae, but was later removed from the subfamily when Ogata, Terayama & Masuko (1995) reviewed the genus, leaving the genus incertae sedis in the family. It was later readded to Leptanillinae.
