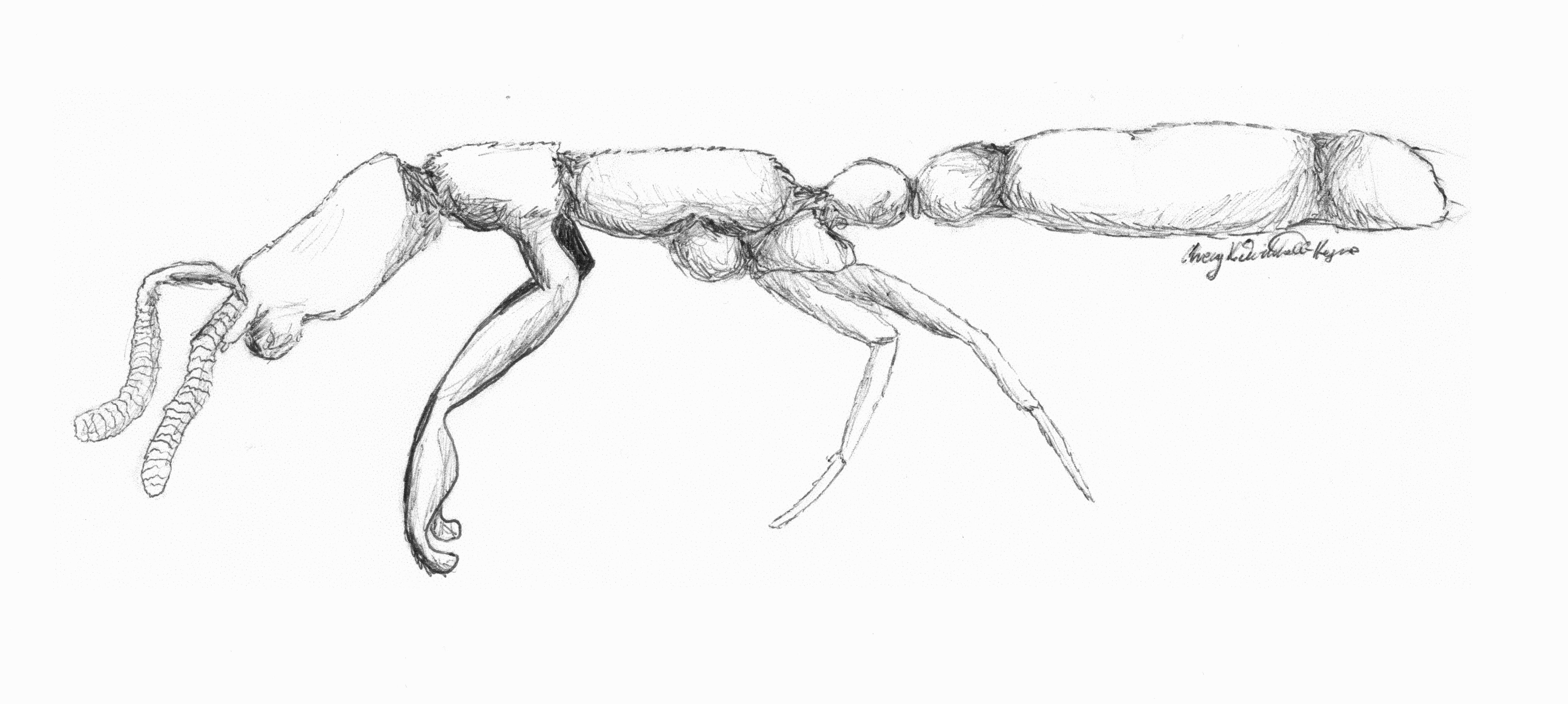
- Leptanilla japonica worker ant

Scientific classification
- Kingdom: Animalia
- Phylum: Arthropoda
- Clade: Pancrustacea
- Class: Insecta
- Order: Hymenoptera
- Family: Formicidae
- Genus: Leptanilla
- Species: L. japonica

Binomial name
- Leptanilla japonica Baroni Urbani, 1977

= Leptanilla japonica =

Species of ant

Leptanilla japonica is an uncommon highly migratory, subterranean ant found in Japan. They are tiny insects, with workers measuring about 1.2 mm and queens reaching to about 1.8 mm, and live in very small colonies of only a few hundred individuals at a time (as compared to the 60,000 to 20,000,000 individuals of legionary ant colonies.) Its sexual development follows a seasonal cycle that affects the colony's migration and feeding habits, and vice versa. L. japonica exhibits specialized predation, with prey consisting mainly of Geophilomorpha, a less reliable food source that also contributes to their high rate of nest migration. Like ants of genera Amblyopone and Proceratium, the genus Leptanilla engages in larval hemolymph feeding (LHF), with the queen using no other form of sustenance. LHF is an advantageous alternative to the more costly cannibalism. Unlike any other ant, however, members of Leptanilla, including L. japonica, have evolved a specialized organ dubbed the “larval hemolymph tap” that reduces the damage LHF inflicts on the larvae. LHF has become this species' main form of nutrition.

== Taxonomy ==
The genus Leptanilla belongs to the subfamily Leptanillinae along with about 30 other known species. Leptanillines were once classified as a tribe of Dorylinae, the subfamily of Old World driver ants. They were raised to subfamily status upon further examination of their unusual larval morphology

== Morphology and description ==
Leptanilla japonica is subterranean, migratory, and a very small ant, measuring only 1.2 mm for workers and 1.8 mm for queens. Workers are yellow and blind.

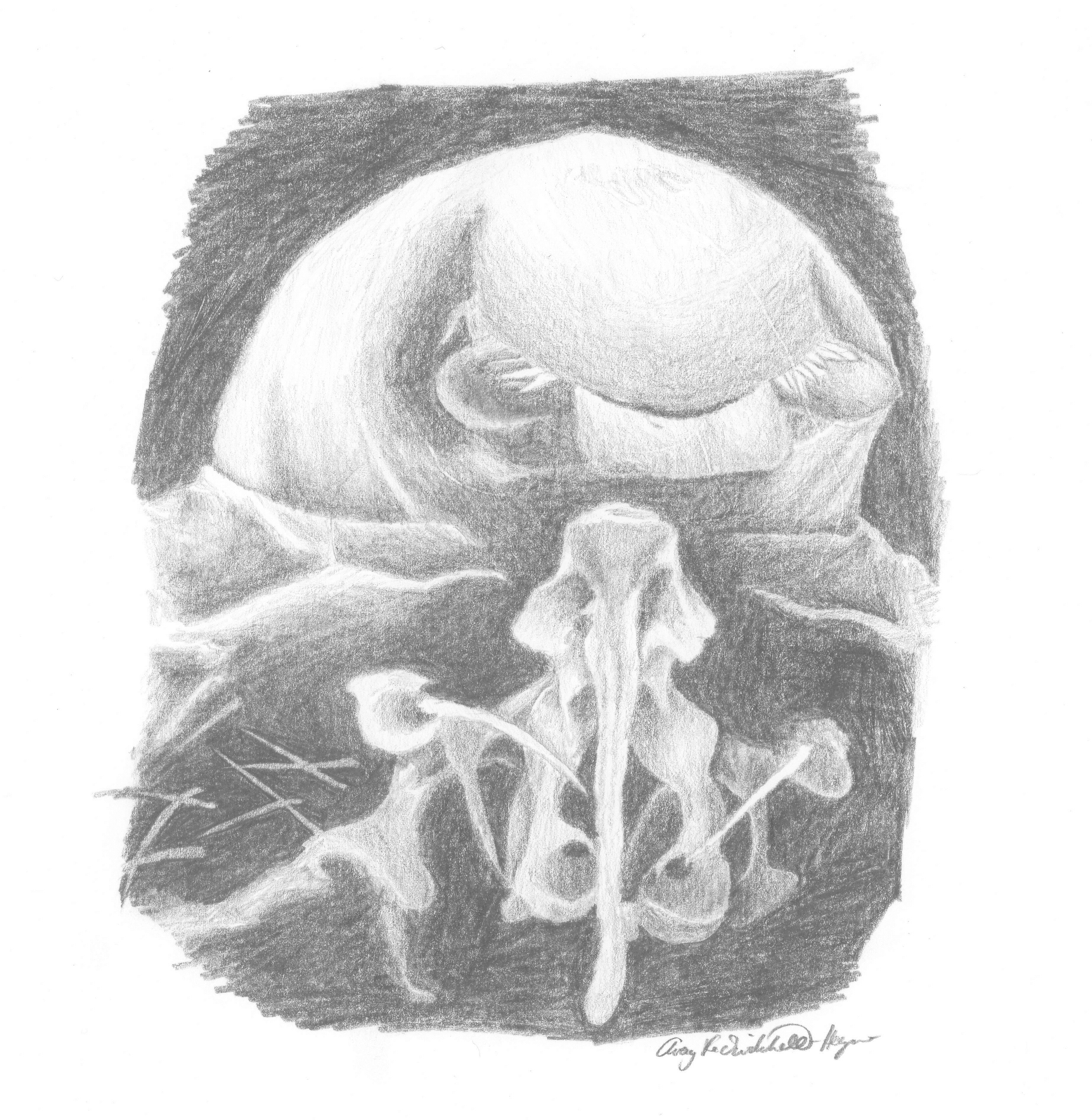
The larva's stenocephalic head with the elaborate prothoracic structure below the mandibles and other mouthparts.

Larvae are smaller, closer to 0.8 mm, with specialized features used in feeding and nest migration. They have relatively large bodies covered in minute hairs and their hairless heads are quite small, a characteristic called stenocephaly; this feature evolved to help large groups of larvae feed on one centipede body at once Their mandibles also developed to help them feed; they are directed outwards and armed with sharp teeth, enabling the larvae to eat without assistance from the workers. Another unusual structure lies on the ventral or bottom side of the first segment of the larvae's thorax, also called their prothorax; workers grab on to this with their lower mouthparts, which are distinct from their mandibles, when transporting larvae during migration. The “larval hemolymph tap” is the Leptanilla larvae's most unusual feature and was formerly thought to be a spiracle. Their spiracles are simply very, very small. The “tap” consists of a duct that connects to their hemolymph, with an opening surrounded by a small hairless area on the fourth abdominal segment. This specialized organ greatly facilitates LHF.

Colonies are very small, with average worker populations numbering only 100-200 individuals. Research suggests that, based on the ant's cyclical development and reproduction, worker populations are renewed annually, with most workers living for about one year.

When migrating either to prey or a new nest site, workers attach their lower mouthparts to the larvae's prothoracic structure and carry them along their body, ventral side to ventral side, with the larva's head pointing forwards. When agitated, however, workers will also simply grab the larva behind the head with their mandibles and drag them.

Queens are larger than workers; they have eyes, but no wings. The posterior or last segment of their abdomen, also called their gaster, is very large in proportion to the rest of their bodies.

Males measure roughly 1.3 mm in size, only a little bigger than the workers, and are unusual in having hairy eyes. They are the only caste with wings, albeit rather small wings. One wing actually consists of two parts: the forewing is larger and has veins; the hindwing is much smaller with no veins. Their mandibles are also different from the females’; whereas the workers and queens mandibles are prominent and mobile, the males’ mandibles are little more than small lobes held close to their head. Male ants of this species have been difficult to find in conjunction with workers and queens, and thus their behavior has not been observed and recorded as extensively as that of the females.

== Development and reproduction ==
Leptanilla japonica develops and reproduces in synchronous, yearly cycles of a larval-growing stage and an egg-laying stage. The active egg-laying stage starts in late spring and ends in late fall. In a very short period in midsummer, the queen lays a batch of roughly 200 eggs while last year's hatch of larvae pupate, or undergo metamorphosis to change from larvae to adults; hatching and adult emergence also occur around the same time. The new larvae develop quickly and hibernate during the winter. Late spring comes and the cycle repeats.

The queen's gaster remains contracted for all of the larval-developing stage, reaching no greater than 0.35 mm in diameter. At the onset of spring, she enters physogastry, a phase in which her gaster greatly expands, while the first few larvae show signs of pupation. Her gaster swells with egg-filled ovarioles and grows up to 1.1 mm in diameter. In spite of their size, queens at this stage are very mobile, in contrast to their near motionlessness during the larval-growing stage.

Very soon after physogastry begins, the queen starts laying eggs in a continuous string, with the occasional help of nearby workers. They grab the eggs with their mandibles and gently pull them away from her cloaca, the orifice of her reproductive tract.

This is only one of many of the workers’ jobs during the egg-laying stage. During this time, workers cease foraging and migrating to focus on caring for the nest. Workers help larvae get rid of their digestive tracts, a process necessary for pupation, and occasionally eat their feces. They also help them shed their larval skin.

== Migration and food cultivation ==
Leptanilla japonica navigate using a trail system marked with a gland secretion from their sternal side, though travel is disorganized and mostly individual. While roughly half of the workers hunts, the other half engages in grooming, larval care, or stands as guards at the edges of the brood pile. The guard ants almost always assume the same position: they face the outside with their anterior end lifted, their forelegs raised, and their mandibles open. Should anything come close, they quickly charge it.

The other half of the workers is occupied with finding, attacking, and paralyzing the species main, if not only, prey, geophilomorph centipedes. Sufficient paralysis can be accomplished with a small number of ants within 10–15 minutes. Most of the time, the workers pull the centipede to the brood pile, with the colony occasionally moving towards the prey as well to meet somewhere in the middle. A few times, however, researchers observed the colony move entirely to the prey site without moving the centipede. During such migrations, workers attached to the larvae's prothoracic structures to carry them to the paralyzed prey. As previously described, the larvae's body and mandible shape make for easy feeding. They rip away the outer tissue, and the workers eat from the holes the larvae make.

Predation is active during the larval-growing stage, but stops during the egg-laying stage along with migration. The main source of nutrition during this stage is the larvae themselves.

== Larval hemolymph feeding ==
The queen of L. japonica eats only via larval hemolymph feeding. During the egg-laying stage and physogastry, her rate of LHF doubles. She moves around grabbing all of the larvae in her path, with workers carrying additional larvae to her.

The physicality of the queen's LHF follows. She strokes a mature larva with her antennae, then holds the posterior end with all six legs, lying on her side and placing her lower mouthparts on the body. She turns the body around, feeling with her mandibles until she finds the “larval hemolymph tap” in the fourth abdominal segment. The lack of lapping movements of the queen's mouthparts and the lack of larval muscles along the duct organ suggest that the hemolymph is ingested via the queen's effort. Hemolymph flow would cease by itself when the queen released the larva or by the hemolymph congealing at the opening.

LHF evolved as a less costly form of last-resort nutrition than cannibalism. Many ant species engage in trophic egg consumption in which the workers have sterile eggs that the ants can feed on. Leptanilla workers, however, do not have ovarioles and thus do not have that option. Because it has never been observed, mouth-to-mouth feeding, or oral trophallaxis, is thought to be absent from this genus. LHF is seen in Amblyopone and Proceratium, but those genera have much larger populations, ranging from 60,000 to 20,000,000 workers per colony. With so many individuals at the queen's disposal, severely damaging the larvae she feeds on would have a negligible negative impact on her reproductive fitness. The queens of Leptanilla, on the other hand, cannot afford such a risk with colonies of only 100-200 individuals; an organ reducing the damage of LHF would be highly selected for in such a species. It also allows for the synchronization and cyclical nature of brood development. The absence of trophic eggs, the cost of cannibalism, the specialized predation of sporadic prey, the cyclical and synchronous colony maturation, and the reduced cost of LHF via the “larval hemolymph tap” have all allowed for LHF to become one of this genus’ main feeding habits.
