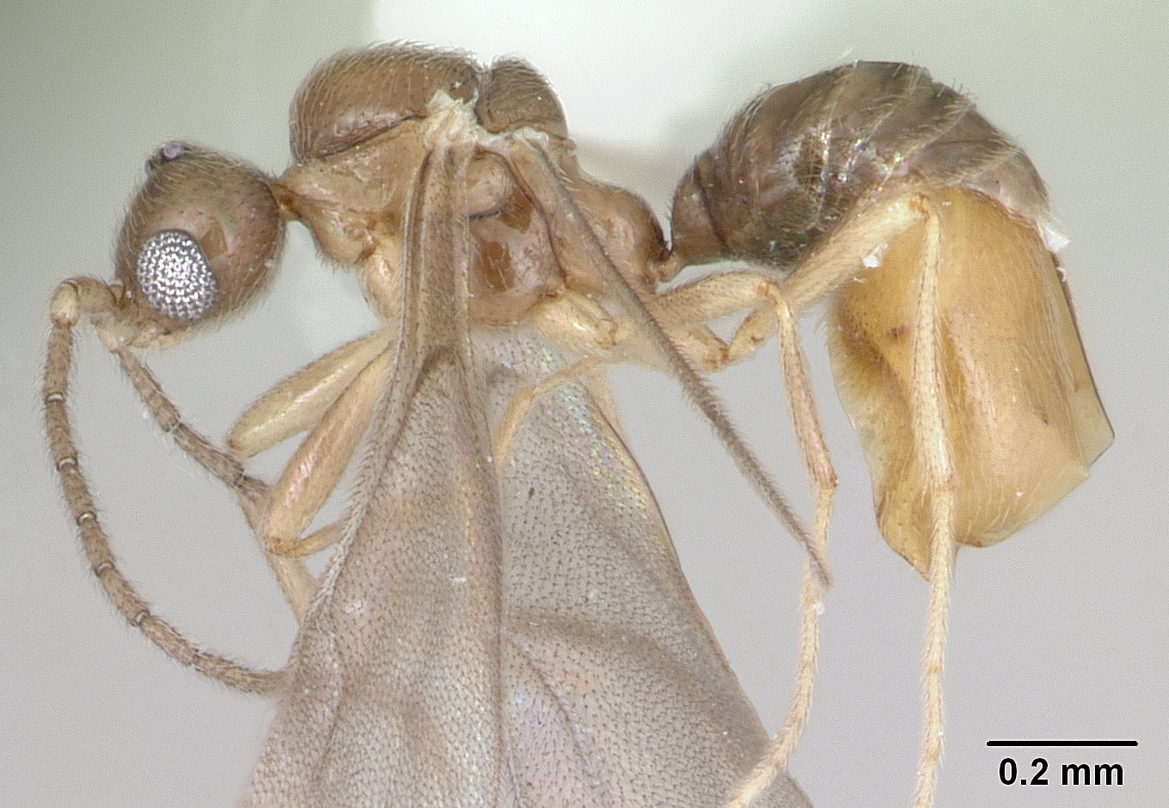
- Leptanilla javana, male specimen

Scientific classification
- Domain: Eukaryota
- Kingdom: Animalia
- Phylum: Arthropoda
- Class: Insecta
- Order: Hymenoptera
- Family: Formicidae
- Genus: Leptanilla
- Species: L. javana

Binomial name
- Leptanilla javana (Wheeler & Wheeler, 1930)

= Leptanilla javana =

Genus of ants

Leptanilla javana is a species of ant in the subfamily Leptanillinae.

The species was first described in 1930 as Phaulomyrma javana, based on two males from Bogor on the island of Java. Leptanilla tanit from Tunisia was originally included in the genus by Wheeler & Wheeler (1930), but was transferred back to Leptanilla by Petersen (1968), making the genus monotypic.
