= Leptanilla alexandri =

Scientific classification
- Kingdom: Animalia
- Phylum: Arthropoda
- Clade: Pancrustacea
- Class: Insecta
- Order: Hymenoptera
- Family: Formicidae
- Genus: Leptanilla
- Species: L. alexandri

Binomial name
- Leptanilla alexandri Dlussky, 1969

Species of ant

Leptanilla alexandri is a species of ant in the subfamily Leptanillinae. It is found only in Uzbekistan.
