= Afrolimnophila joana =

Scientific classification
- Domain: Eukaryota
- Kingdom: Animalia
- Phylum: Arthropoda
- Class: Insecta
- Order: Diptera
- Family: Limoniidae
- Genus: Afrolimnophila
- Species: A. joana

Binomial name
- Afrolimnophila joana (Alexander, 1956)

Species of fly

Afrolimnophila joana is a species of Limoniid crane fly in the family Limoniidae. it was originally placed in the genus Limnophila.

== Distribution ==
Nigeria
