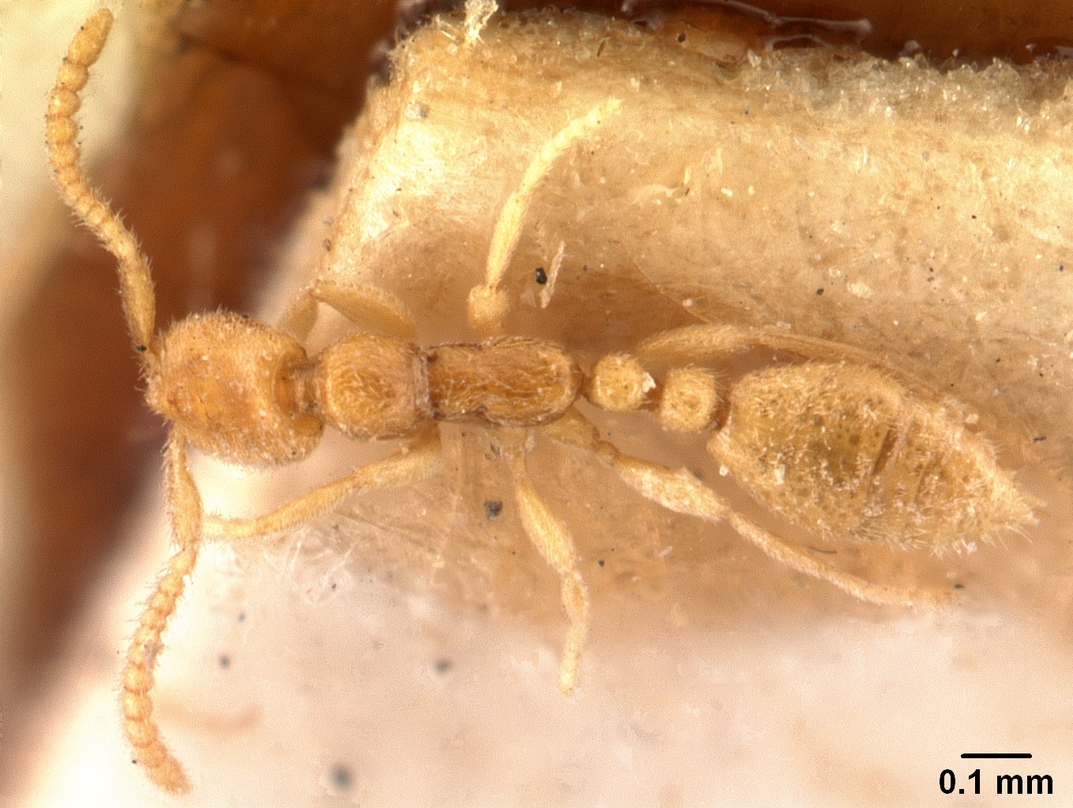

Scientific classification
- Domain: Eukaryota
- Kingdom: Animalia
- Phylum: Arthropoda
- Class: Insecta
- Order: Hymenoptera
- Family: Formicidae
- Genus: Leptanilla
- Species: L. havilandi

Binomial name
- Leptanilla havilandi Forel, 1901

= Leptanilla havilandi =

Species of ant

Leptanilla havilandi is a species of ant in the subfamily Leptanillinae. The species can be found in Singapore and Malaysia.
