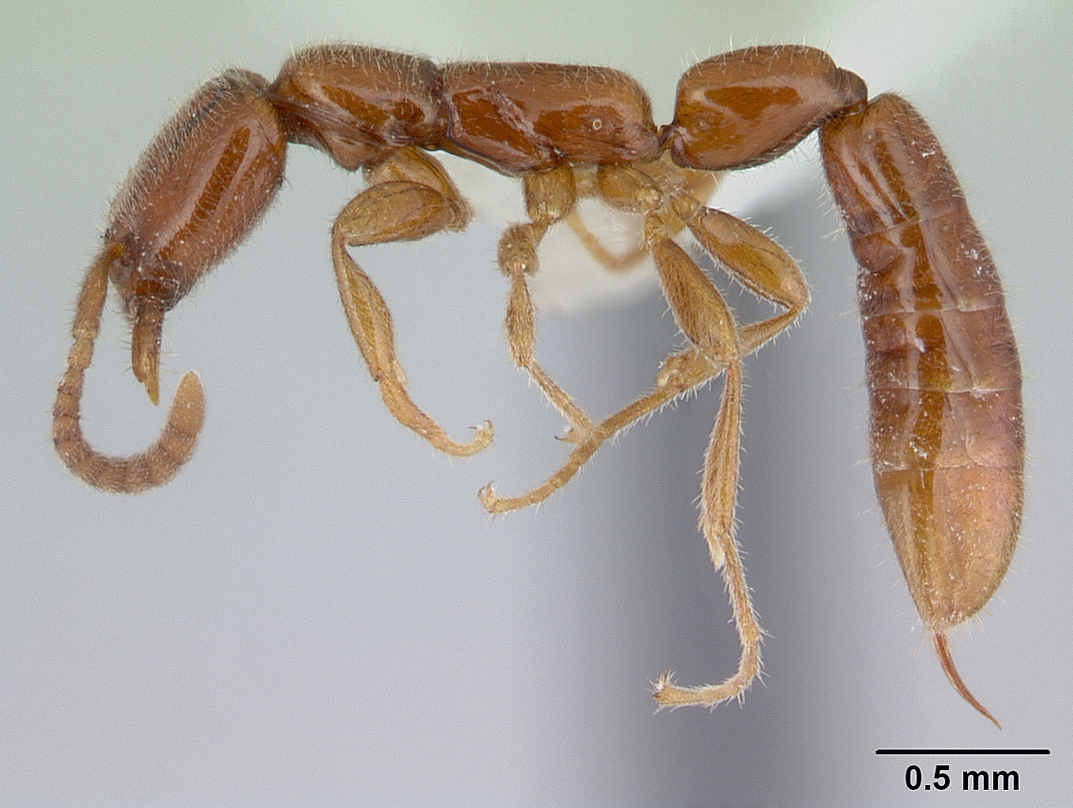

Scientific classification
- Domain: Eukaryota
- Kingdom: Animalia
- Phylum: Arthropoda
- Class: Insecta
- Order: Hymenoptera
- Family: Formicidae
- Subfamily: Leptanillinae
- Tribe: Opamyrmini
- Genus: Opamyrma
- Species: O. hungvuong

Binomial name
- Opamyrma hungvuong Yamane, Bui & Eguchi, 2008

= Opamyrma =

Genus of ants

Opamyrma hungvuong is a species of ant found in central Vietnam, first described in 2008. It is the only species in the genus Opamyrma. While originally classified in the subfamily Amblyoponinae, it is presently considered to belong to the subfamily Leptanillinae.
