= Protanilla schoedli =

Scientific classification
- Kingdom: Animalia
- Phylum: Arthropoda
- Clade: Pancrustacea
- Class: Insecta
- Order: Hymenoptera
- Family: Formicidae
- Genus: Protanilla
- Species: P. schoedli

Binomial name
- Protanilla schoedli Baroni Urbani & De Andrade, 2006

Species of ant

Protanilla schoedli is a species of ant in the genus Protanilla. It was first described in 2006 from a gyne collected in Sri Lanka. It is named after Stefan Schödl.
