= Myopopone sinensis =

Scientific classification
- Domain: Eukaryota
- Kingdom: Animalia
- Phylum: Arthropoda
- Class: Insecta
- Order: Hymenoptera
- Family: Formicidae
- Genus: Myopopone
- Species: †M. sinensis

Binomial name
- †Myopopone sinensis Zhang, 1989

Species of ant

Myopopone sinensis is an extinct species of ant in the genus Myopopone. Fossils were discovered in 1989 in China, and was later described by Zhang in that year.
