= Protanilla furcomandibula =

Scientific classification
- Domain: Eukaryota
- Kingdom: Animalia
- Phylum: Arthropoda
- Class: Insecta
- Order: Hymenoptera
- Family: Formicidae
- Genus: Protanilla
- Species: P. furcomandibula

Binomial name
- Protanilla furcomandibula (Xu & Zhang, 2002)

Genus of ants

Protanilla furcomandibula, formerly Furcotanilla furcomandibula, is a species of ant in the subfamily Leptanillinae. It is only known from Yunnan, China, where it nests in the soil and forages on the ground. Queens and males are unknown.
