= Limnophila fuscovaria =

Scientific classification
- Domain: Eukaryota
- Kingdom: Animalia
- Phylum: Arthropoda
- Class: Insecta
- Order: Diptera
- Family: Limoniidae
- Genus: Limnophila
- Species: L. fuscovaria

Binomial name
- Limnophila fuscovaria Osten Sacken, 1859

Species of fly

Limnophila fuscovaria is a species of limoniid crane fly in the family Limoniidae.
