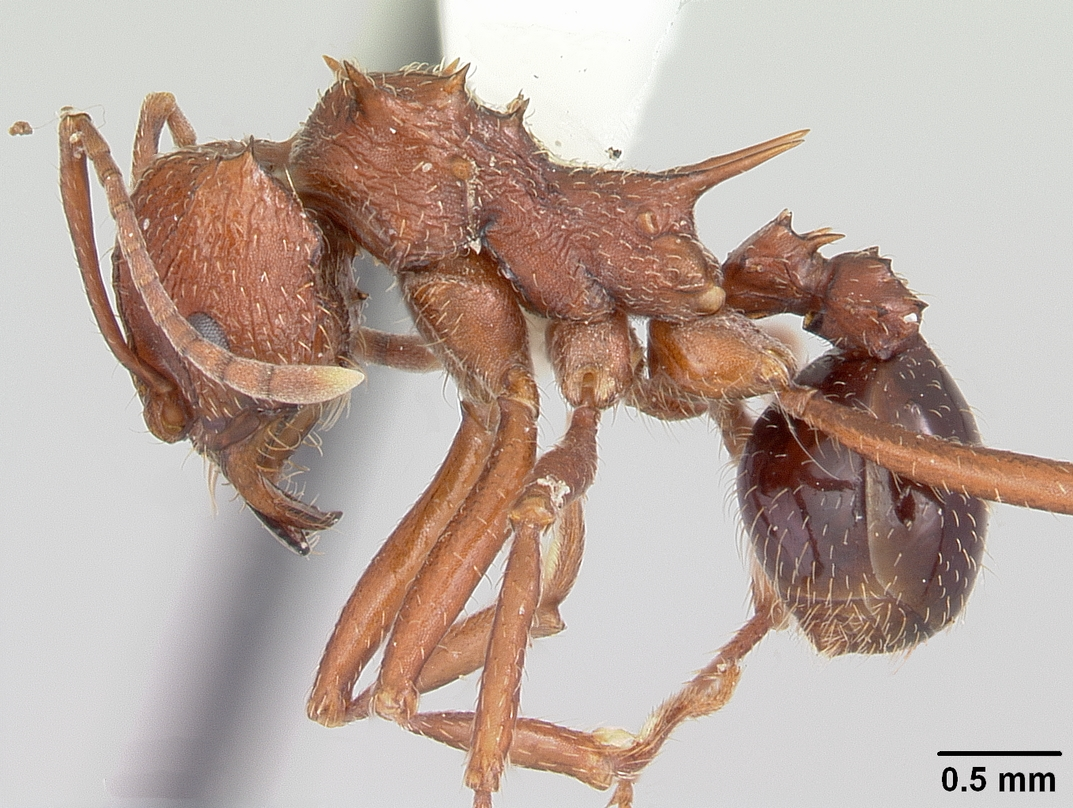
- Amoimyrmex striatus antweb.org specimen

Scientific classification
- Domain: Eukaryota
- Kingdom: Animalia
- Phylum: Arthropoda
- Class: Insecta
- Order: Hymenoptera
- Family: Formicidae
- Subfamily: Myrmicinae
- Tribe: Attini
- Genus: Amoimyrmex; Cristiano, Cardoso & Sandoval, 2020

Type species
- Atta striata Cristiano, Cardoso & Sandoval, 2020

Diversity
- 3 species

= Amoimyrmex =

Genus of ants

Amoimyrmex is a genus of leafcutter ants that occur in southern South America, specifically Bolivia, Paraguay, Uruguay, Argentina, and southern Brazil. All three of its species used to belong in Acromyrmex.

== Species ==
- Amoimyrmex bruchi (Forel, 1912)
- Amoimyrmex silvestrii (Emery, 1905)
- Amoimyrmex striatus (Roger, 1863)
