= Apopyllus =

Scientific classification
- Kingdom: Animalia
- Phylum: Arthropoda
- Subphylum: Chelicerata
- Class: Arachnida
- Order: Araneae
- Infraorder: Araneomorphae
- Family: Gnaphosidae
- Genus: Apopyllus; Platnick & Shadab, 1984

Type species
- A. silvestrii (Simon, 1905)

Species
- 10, see text

Genus of spiders

Apopyllus is a genus of ground spiders that was first described by Norman I. Platnick & M. U. Shadab in 1984.

== Species ==
As of May 2019 it contains ten species:

- Apopyllus aeolicus Azevedo, Ott, Griswold & Santos, 2016 – Brazil
- Apopyllus atlanticus Azevedo, Ott, Griswold & Santos, 2016 – Brazil
- Apopyllus centralis Azevedo, Ott, Griswold & Santos, 2016 – Brazil
- Apopyllus gandarela Azevedo, Ott, Griswold & Santos, 2016 – Brazil
- Apopyllus huanuco Platnick & Shadab, 1984 – Peru
- Apopyllus ivieorum Platnick & Shadab, 1984 – Mexico
- Apopyllus malleco Platnick & Shadab, 1984 – Chile
- Apopyllus now Platnick & Shadab, 1984 – Curaçao, Colombia
- Apopyllus silvestrii (Simon, 1905) (type) – Peru, Bolivia, Brazil, Argentina, Chile
- Apopyllus suavis (Simon, 1893) – Venezuela, Peru, Brazil, Argentina
