= Larval hemolymph feeding =

Larval hemolymph feeding is a behaviour trait found in the queens of some species of ant. This is found mainly in the ants of the subfamily Amblyoponinae and give them the other name of Dracula ant. In colonies of the Amblyopone silvestrii the queens feed on the hemolymph (or insect blood, also spelt haemolymph) of their larvae when food is not available. In one species, Myopopone castanea, worker ants consume larval hemolymph. This is said to be a precursor to trophallaxis in other ant families. The larvae themselves are not killed by this process. This behaviour is also seen in Proceratium and in Leptanilla the larvae have special organs that exude the haemolymph. On the other hand, the foundresses suppress larval hemolymph feeding (LHF) when prey is available, allowing them to rear the first workers more swiftly. The nondestructive form of cannibalism can be regarded as a nutritive adaptation related to: (1) the lack of social food transfer in this species, and (2) its specialized predation on large sporadic prey (centipedes). LHF similar to that in Amblyopone was found in Proceratium and another type of LHF, with a larval specialized exudatory organ, in Leptanilla.
