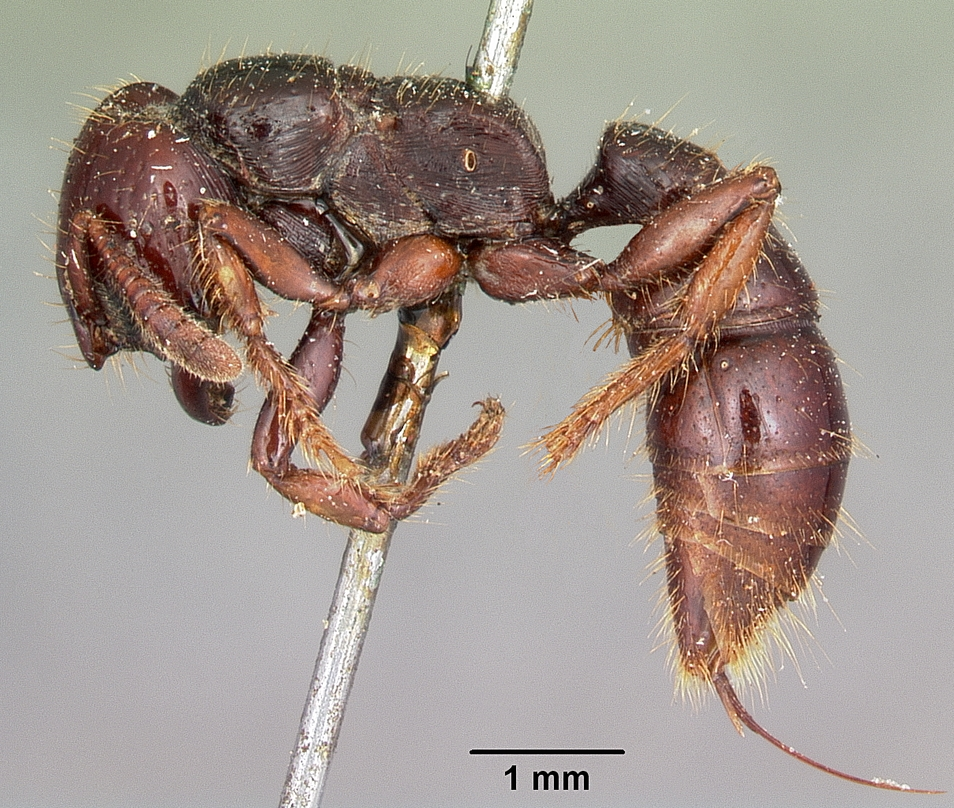
- Myopopone castanea worker

Scientific classification
- Domain: Eukaryota
- Kingdom: Animalia
- Phylum: Arthropoda
- Class: Insecta
- Order: Hymenoptera
- Family: Formicidae
- Subfamily: Amblyoponinae
- Tribe: Amblyoponini
- Genus: Myopopone; Roger, 1861

Type species
- Myopopone maculata Roger, 1861

Diversity
- 2 species

= Myopopone =

Genus of ants

Myopopone is a genus of ants in the subfamily Amblyoponinae. The genus contains two species, one extant and one fossil. The type species Myopopone castanea is known from the Oriental and Indo-Australian regions, and China. The fossil species, Myopopone sinensis, is known from the Early Miocene.

== Species ==
- Myopopone castanea (Smith, 1860)
- †Myopopone sinensis Zhang, 1989
