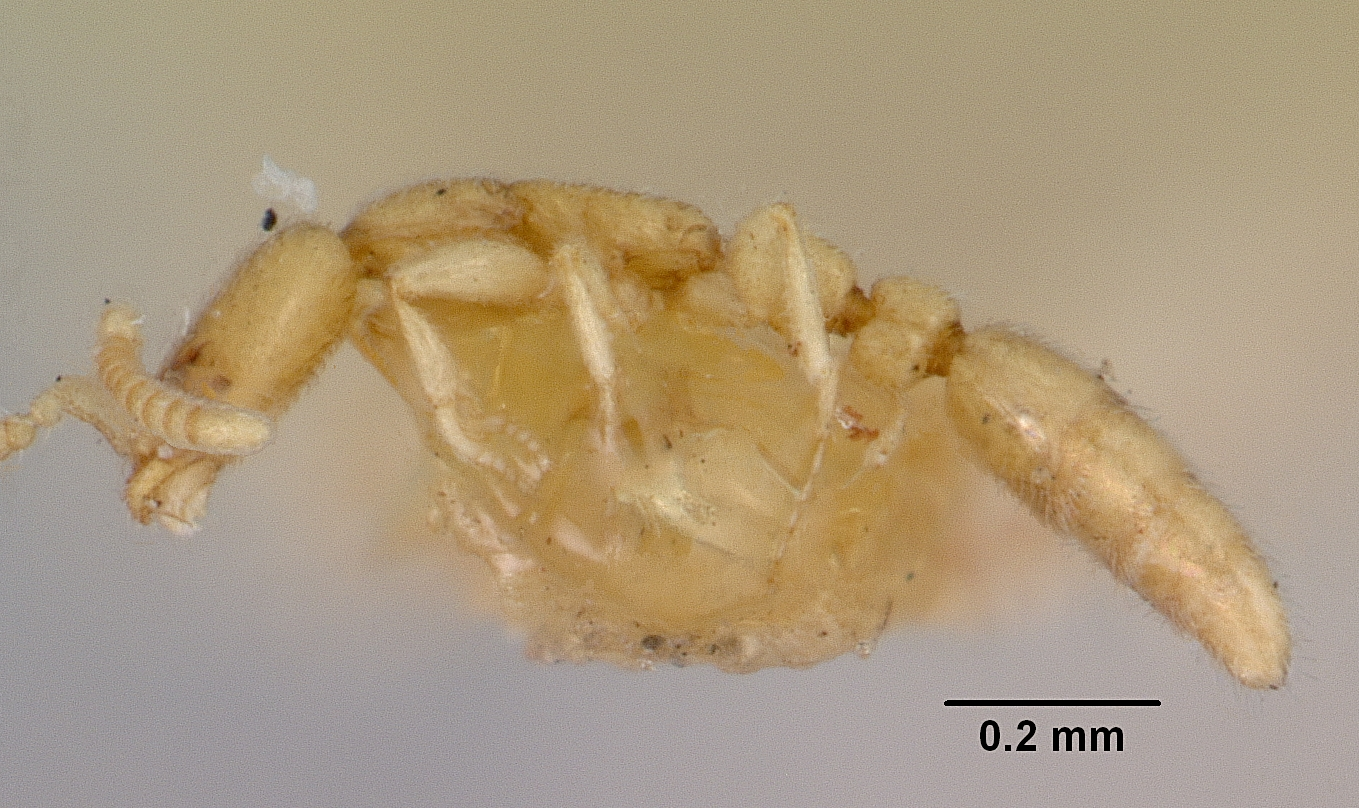
- Leptanilla swani worker

Scientific classification
- Kingdom: Animalia
- Phylum: Arthropoda
- Class: Insecta
- Order: Hymenoptera
- Family: Formicidae
- Genus: Leptanilla
- Species: L. swani

Binomial name
- Leptanilla swani Wheeler, W.M., 1932

= Leptanilla swani =

Species of ant

Leptanilla swani is a species of ant in the genus Leptanilla. Described by William Morton Wheeler in 1932, the species is endemic to Australia, and one of only two species of the genus Leptanilla to be found there. Workers are pale in colour, measuring 1.3 to 5 millimetres (0.051 to 0.197 in) while queens are larger at 2 millimetres (0.079 in) long.
