= Limnophila angustula =

Scientific classification
- Domain: Eukaryota
- Kingdom: Animalia
- Phylum: Arthropoda
- Class: Insecta
- Order: Diptera
- Family: Limoniidae
- Genus: Limnophila
- Species: L. angustula

Binomial name
- Limnophila angustula Alexander, 1929

Species of fly

Limnophila angustula is a species of limoniid crane fly in the family Limoniidae.
