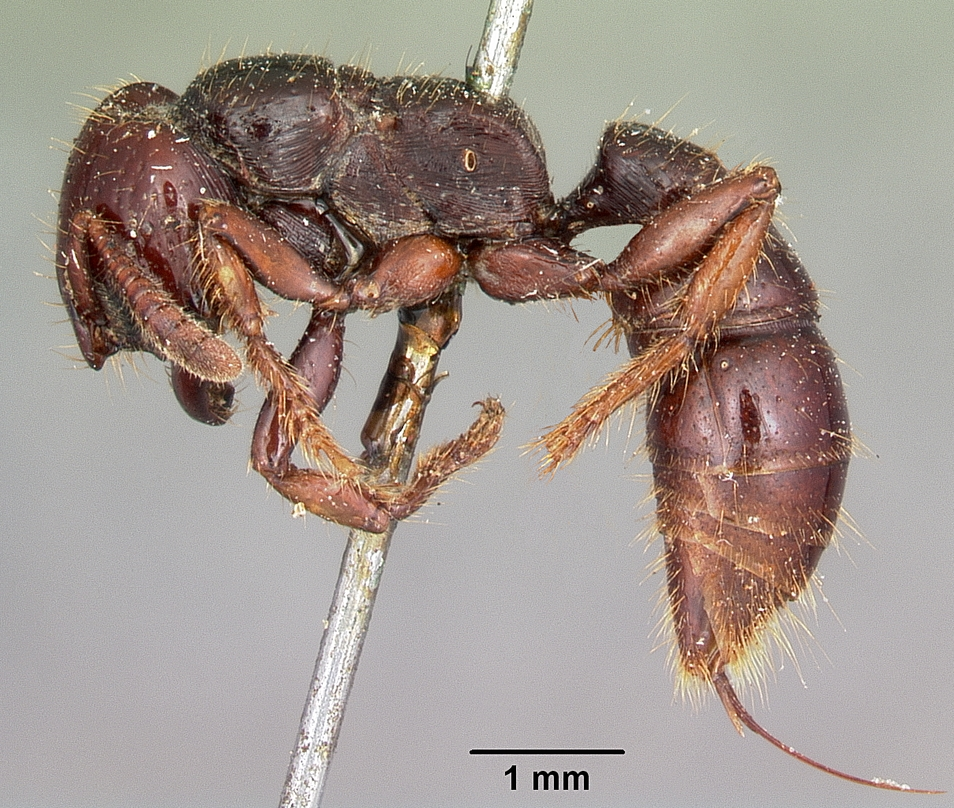
- Myopopone castanea worker

Scientific classification
- Kingdom: Animalia
- Phylum: Arthropoda
- Clade: Pancrustacea
- Class: Insecta
- Order: Hymenoptera
- Family: Formicidae
- Genus: Myopopone
- Species: M. castanea

Binomial name
- Myopopone castanea (Smith, F., 1860)

Synonyms
- Myopopone beccarii Emery, 1887; Myopopone castanea bakeri Viehmeyer, 1916; Myopopone castanea bugnioni Forel, 1913; Myopopone castanea proxima Stitz, 1925; Myopopone maculata Roger, 1861; Myopopone moelleri Bingham, 1903; Myopopone moelleri striatifrons Stitz, 1925; Myopopone picea Donisthorpe, 1938; Myopopone rossi Donisthorpe, 1948; Myopopone rufula Roger, 1861; Myopopone similis Donisthorpe, 1949; Myopopone smithi Donisthorpe, 1947; Myopopone wollastoni Donisthorpe, 1942

= Myopopone castanea =

Species of ant

Myopopone castanea is a species of ant in the genus Myopopone. It was described by Smith in 1860.

== Distribution ==
Myopopone castanea is distributed in several Asian countries (such as Borneo and Indonesia) and in Australia, where they prefer to nest in rotten wood or bark.

== Ecology ==
Myopopone castanea is a predator of Coleoptera larvae that has been studied for potential use as a biological pest control insect of Oryctes rhinoceros larvae. The species is the only species known that has workers engage in larval hemolymph feeding.
