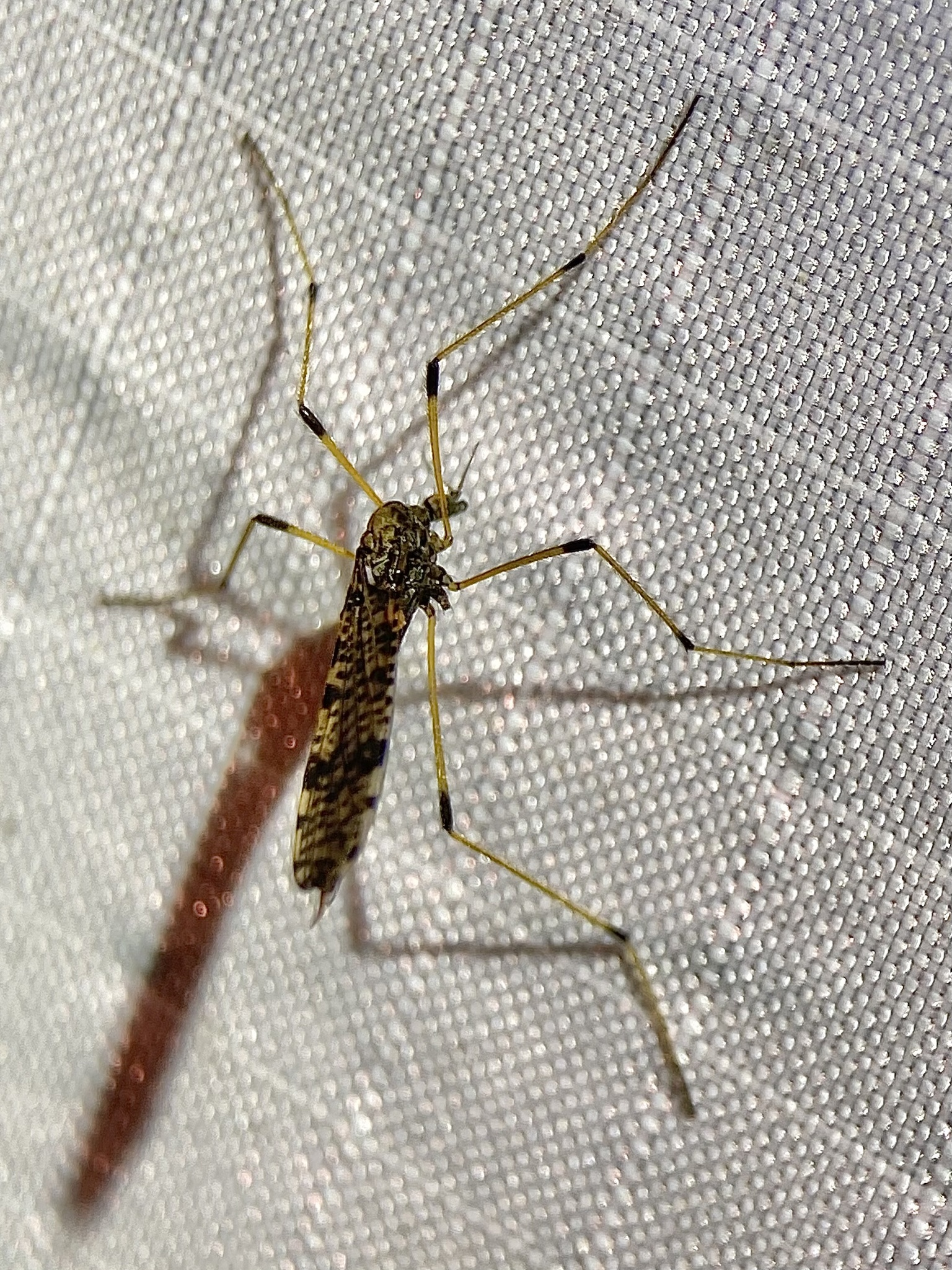
- Afrolimnophila irrorata

Scientific classification
- Kingdom: Animalia
- Phylum: Arthropoda
- Clade: Pancrustacea
- Class: Insecta
- Order: Diptera
- Family: Limoniidae
- Subfamily: Limnophilinae
- Genus: Afrolimnophila; Alexander, 1956

Type species
- Limnophila dichroica Alexander, 1956

Species
- see text

= Afrolimnophila =

Genus of flies

Afrolimnophila is a genus of crane flies in the family Limoniidae.

== Species ==
The following species are recognised in the genus Afrolimnophila:

- A. abludens (Savchenko, 1971)
- A. abyssinica (Alexander, 1920)
- A. aino (Alexander, 1929)
- A. amabilis (Alexander, 1950)
- A. antimena (Alexander, 1956)
- A. antimenoides (Alexander, 1956)
- A. apicifusca (Alexander, 1964)
- A. asura (Alexander, 1956) - (Uncertain placement in Afrolimnophila)
- A. basispina (Savchenko, 1971)
- A. bicoloripes (Alexander, 1964)
- A. dichroica (Alexander, 1956)
- A. dicranophragmoides (Alexander, 1924)
- A. euglena (Alexander, 1971)
- A. fenestrella (Alexander, 1940)
- A. ghesquierei (Alexander, 1970)
- A. guttularis (Edwards, 1926)
- A. hartwigi (Alexander, 1974)
- A. irrorata (Johnson, 1909)
- A. joana (Alexander, 1974)
- A. melampodia (Alexander, 1956)
- A. minima (Savchenko, 1971)
- A. murudensis (Edwards, 1926)
- A. namwambae (Alexander, 1956)
- A. pakkana (Edwards, 1933)
- A. pendleburyi (Edwards, 1928)
- A. perdelecta (Alexander, 1964)
- A. petulans (Alexander, 1932)
- A. piceipes (Alexander, 1968)
- A. pterosticta (Alexander, 1964)
- A. pusan (Alexander, 1964)
- A. raoana (Alexander, 1942)
- A. scabristyla (Alexander, 1964)
- A. stenacris (Alexander, 1968)
- A. unijuga (Alexander, 1920)
- A. urundiana (Alexander, 1955)
- A. vansomereni (Alexander, 1956)
