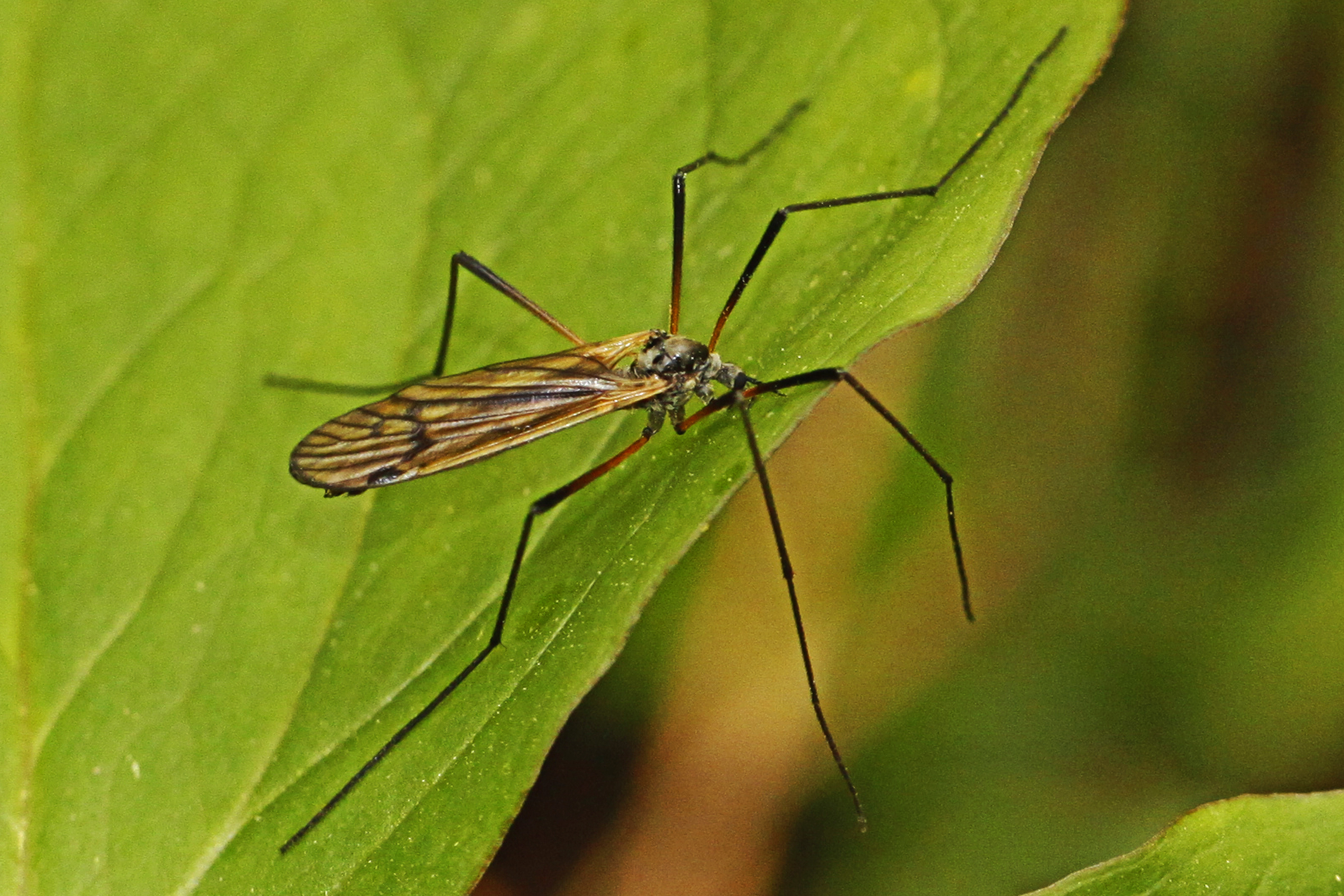

Scientific classification
- Domain: Eukaryota
- Kingdom: Animalia
- Phylum: Arthropoda
- Class: Insecta
- Order: Diptera
- Family: Limoniidae
- Genus: Limnophila
- Species: L. rufibasis

Binomial name
- Limnophila rufibasis (Osten Sacken)

= Limnophila rufibasis =

Species of fly

Limnophila rufibasis is a species of limoniid crane fly in the family Limoniidae.
