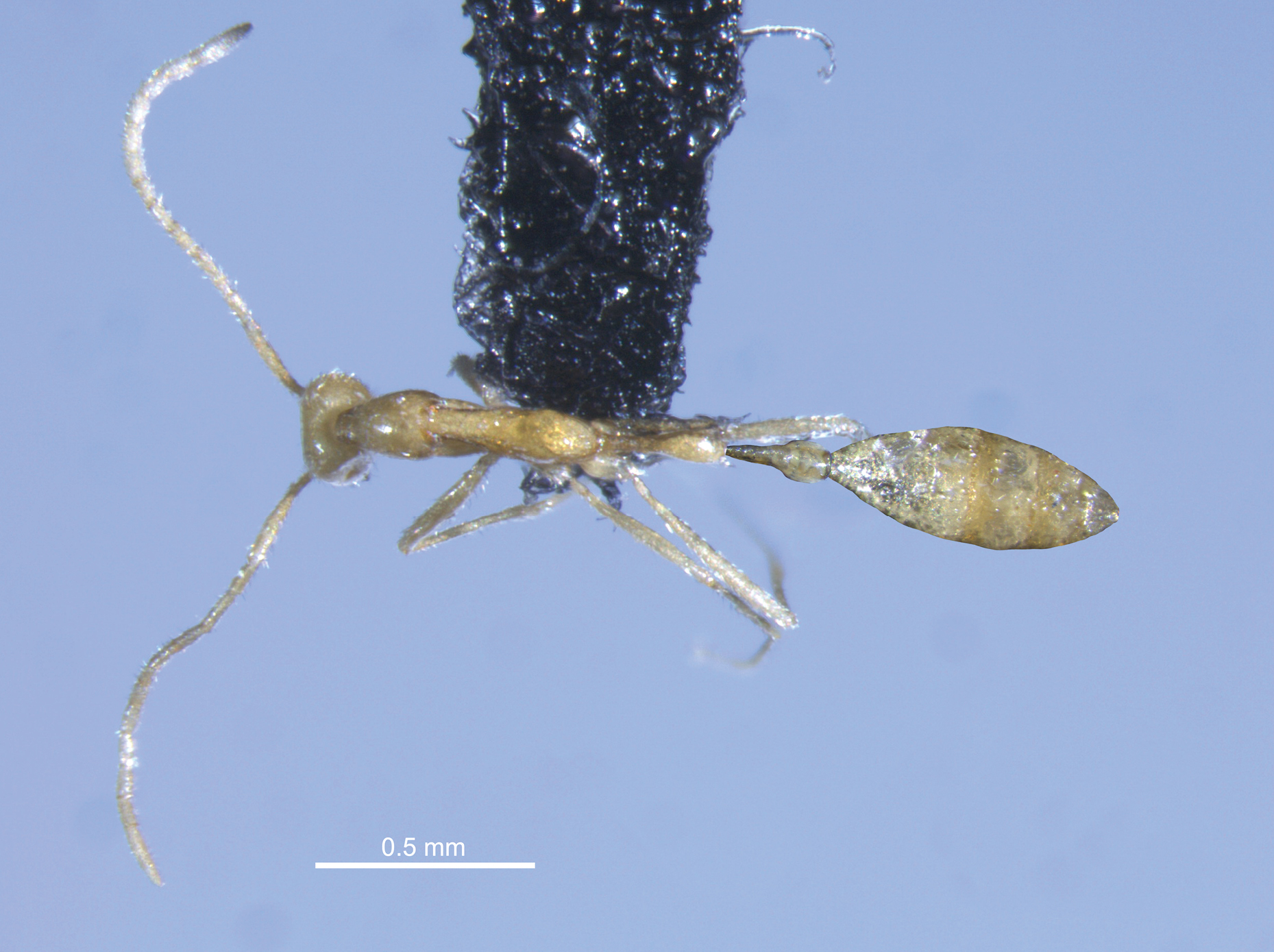

Scientific classification
- Domain: Eukaryota
- Kingdom: Animalia
- Phylum: Arthropoda
- Class: Insecta
- Order: Hymenoptera
- Family: Formicidae
- Genus: Leptanilla
- Species: L. voldemort

Binomial name
- Leptanilla voldemort Wong & McRae, 2024

= Leptanilla voldemort =

Species of ant

Leptanilla voldemort is a species of ant in the genus Leptanilla and was described in 2024.

It was named after the Harry Potter villain, Lord Voldemort. This species was found in the Pilbara region in the Western Australian outback.

This species is said to live underground and is described as having an extremely "ghostly and slender" appearance, as well as having sharp mandibles. Researchers are hoping that this scientific discovery will bring to light a better understanding of subterranean ants. It was described by Mark Wong.
