= Limnophila marchandi =

Scientific classification
- Domain: Eukaryota
- Kingdom: Animalia
- Phylum: Arthropoda
- Class: Insecta
- Order: Diptera
- Family: Limoniidae
- Genus: Limnophila
- Species: L. marchandi

Binomial name
- Limnophila marchandi Alexander, 1916

Species of fly

Limnophila marchandi is a species of limoniid crane fly in the family Limoniidae.
