= Leptanilla besucheti =

Scientific classification
- Kingdom: Animalia
- Phylum: Arthropoda
- Clade: Pancrustacea
- Class: Insecta
- Order: Hymenoptera
- Family: Formicidae
- Genus: Leptanilla
- Species: L. besucheti

Binomial name
- Leptanilla besucheti Baroni Urbani, 1977

Species of ant

Leptanilla besucheti is a species of ant. It is found in Sri Lanka.
