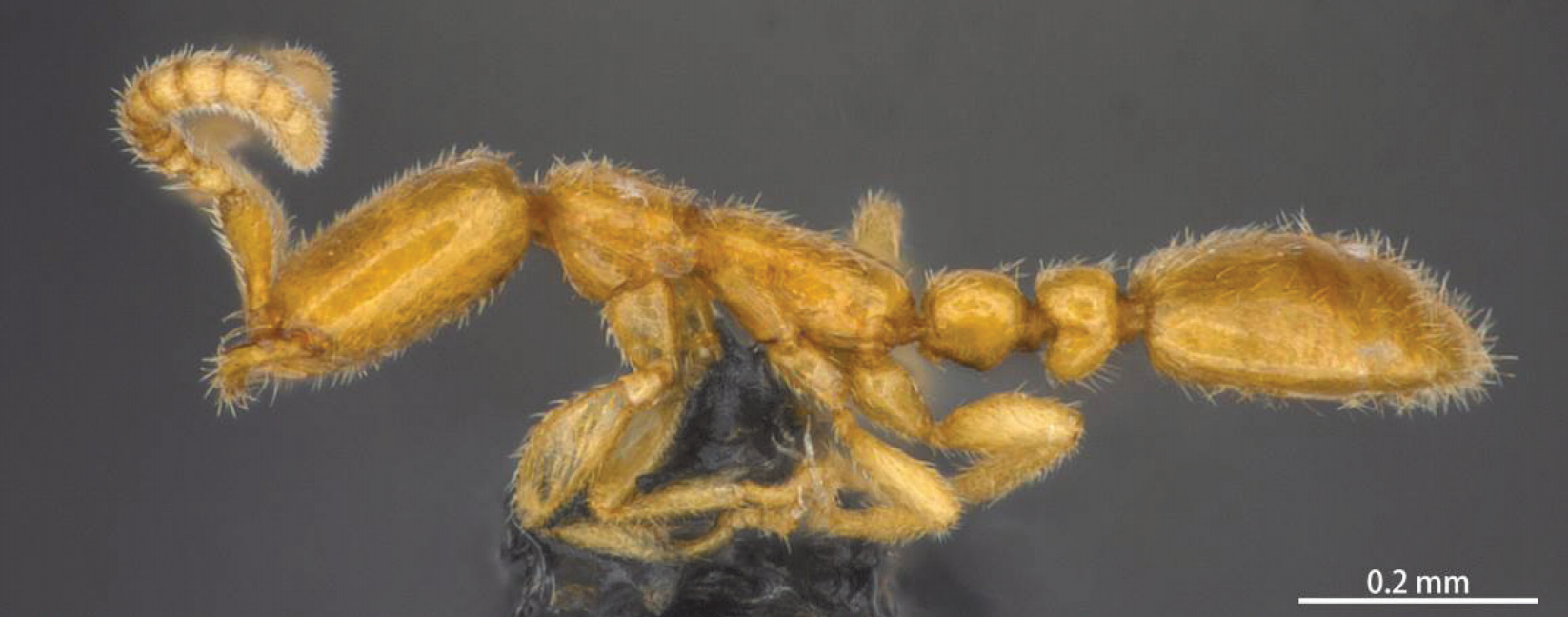
- Holotype worker in lateral view

Scientific classification
- Domain: Eukaryota
- Kingdom: Animalia
- Phylum: Arthropoda
- Class: Insecta
- Order: Hymenoptera
- Family: Formicidae
- Genus: Leptanilla
- Species: L. macauensis

Binomial name
- Leptanilla macauensis Leong, Yamane & Guénard, 2018

= Leptanilla macauensis =

Species of ant

Leptanilla macauensis is a species of ant in the genus Leptanilla. Chi-Man Leong (梁志文), an undergraduate student at National Taiwan University at the time, first collected specimens of this species. The species was subsequently formally described by Leong, Yamane & Guénard in 2018, the species is only known from specimens collected from Macau by means of a Winkler extractor. Workers are yellowish brown in colour, measuring 1.12 to 1.14 millimetres (0.044 to 0.045 in). The queen has yet to be described.
