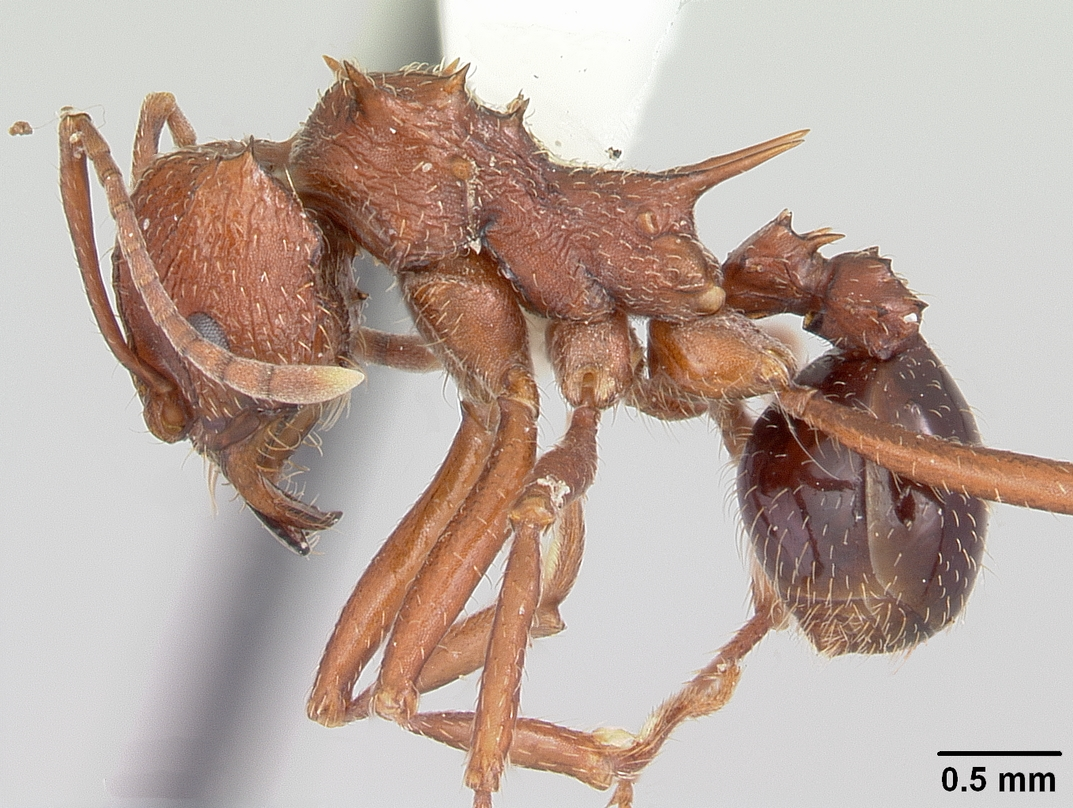
- A. striatus worker

Scientific classification
- Kingdom: Animalia
- Phylum: Arthropoda
- Clade: Pancrustacea
- Class: Insecta
- Order: Hymenoptera
- Family: Formicidae
- Subfamily: Myrmicinae
- Genus: Amoimyrmex
- Species: A. striatus

Binomial name
- Amoimyrmex striatus (Roger, 1863)

= Amoimyrmex striatus =

Species of ant

Amoimyrmex striatus is a species of leafcutter ant found in the Neotropics.

It is a member of the subfamily Myrmicinae, and within the tribe Attini. As an attine, A. striatus forages for vegetation that will be applied to the fungal garden, typical in all leaf-cutting species. The fungus is fed the mycophagous larvae and queen, while workers are nourished primarily by the sap of cut plants, and very little by the mutualistic fungus making them respectively, phytophagous, and mycophagous. The presence of leaf-cutter ants is so common in the Neotropics, that they are considered to be the main herbivores of these areas.,

A. striatus is a polymorphic species, meaning that there are several different sizes of workers, with the largest being 6.5 mm long. This is done to compartmentalize a variety of tasks so they can be done efficiently.

== Distribution ==
A. striatus is most commonly found in the southern states of Santa Catarina and Rio Grande do Sul in Brazil, and also the countries of Argentina, Uruguay, and Paraguay. At least in Argentina, it prefers nest sites in arid and semi-arid areas, where the sun can shine on it all year.

== Foraging ==
A. striatus is an opportunistic forager, collecting material from all available sources. These ants may cut directly from plants, they may scavenge materials that have already fallen, or they may even collect feces or carcasses of other arthropods. In fact, researchers have found that at least 53 different species of plants are collected by A. striatus, from 23 families, the majority being Compositae, Gramineae, and Leguminosae. However, in terms of foraging area, A. striatus generally keep to grasses and shrubs., Foraging takes place only on days with a temperature of greater than 20 °C., This means that in more temperate climates, foraging is restricted to a few hours a day, and only during summer. It has been documented that A. striatus demonstrates a "resource conservation strategy", which theorizes that workers will choose to forage farther away from the nest to avoid overexploitation of resources closer to home. This would result in target resources having a chance to regrow before being collected again. It has been hypothesized that the driving force behind this behavior is that the ants are concerned with obtaining high quality materials. It seems that A. striatus is accomplished at providing its mutualistic fungus with a steady and predictable supply of nourishment. This can be proven in one study, for it shows that the ant uses similar amounts of a multitude of plant species throughout the year.

Farmers may find themselves competing with A. striatus if the vegetation present in an area is intended for human consumption., Foraging methods may be prevented in a variety of ways, but in terms of natural control, it seems that the ant Camponotus blandus (a non-leaf-cutting species) deters A. striatus from foraging on the shrubs where it collects nectar.

== Nests ==
Nests can be found primarily in the open, where the sun can shine on them regularly and directly. The ground is cleared by the workers around the opening.

In order to prevent the spread of fires in South America, firebreaks have been implemented. Curiously, A. striatus favor these areas. Ant nests are carefully regulated to maintain stable conditions in humidity, moisture, temperature, carbon dioxide levels, and many other factors. When humans dig up the ground, the soil is more porous, which allows for better gas exchange and water infiltration, aiding the fungal gardens. Indeed, not just in firebreaks but any anthropogenic modification of the soil, including roadsides. These favorable conditions for A. striatus result in a competitive advantage over other species of ant, and may result in increased damage to nearby plant materials.

== Nuptial flights ==
Many species of ant disperse a large amount of sexual individuals in the air at once, synchronized with other colonies of the same species. This increases the mixing of individuals from different colonies, and therefore inhibits genetic instability through inbreeding. While in A. striatus, few individuals participate in nuptial flights, increasing the likelihood of mating with related individuals. Also, breeding time is extended over a period of months, not weeks. Sexual individuals are produced from October to January, with small numbers of individuals departing the nest every day while it is sunny. Therefore, polyandry, which is the behavior of multiple fathers contributing their sperm, plays an important role in maintaining genetic diversity. We can see evidence of this theory in reality as there are more males than females on average in A. striatus nuptial flights.

== Social hierarchy and genetics ==
Acromyrmex is the most complex taxon of the family Formicidae. Complexity in the reproductive caste (queens and males) account for this. Possible configurations of the reproductive caste in ant colonies are, monogyny (one queen), polygyny (multiple queens), monandry (sperm supplied by one male), polyandry (sperm supplied by multiple males), and worker reproduction. Colonies may be founded by haplometrosis (by one queen) or by pleometrosis (by multiple queens). Each of these examples impact the overall genetic relatedness of all members of the colony.

In most ant species, colony foundation is haplometric. The queen lands after the nuptial flight, chews off her wings so they will not impede her burrowing, and excavates a main chamber. After some time, she must leave the chamber and forage for food.

It has been found that the configuration of the reproductive caste in A. striatus is dependent upon densities of colonizing queens. Mature colonies are very competitive, so in conditions where there are many mature A. striatus colonies, or many reproductive females, queens have been observed to start a new colony together, without respect to how they are related to one another. In these conditions, brood rearing can occur rapidly, all co-queens dig and share a main chamber, and tend to the same fungal garden. The queens do not need to leave to forage either, resulting in minimal chances of being preyed upon. More workers are produced and fungal gardens are larger. However, it has been observed in other Acromyrmex species, that eventually all queens except for one are executed.

== Seed dispersal ==
Many species of ants are very important to plants as a method of seed dispersal. A. striatus is no exception. It has been seen that the leaf-cutting ants forage the fruit and seeds of many different species. In addition, as they cut away the more fleshy parts of the fruit, fungi cannot infect the seeds, increasing the likelihood of viable germination. The ants collect the fruit and seeds and bring them back to their nest, possibly losing some seeds in transit. Usable matter is fed to the fungus, while the inedible parts are discarded immediately outside the colony. Therefore, abandoned ant nests are an important site for the next plant generation. A. striatus has been recorded exhibiting this behavior in relation to many plants, including Schinus fasciculates, native to Argentina. A. striatus ‘accidentally’ transports seeds of plants that have no attractive structures on their seeds designed to encourage ant transport.

Distance of dispersal is entirely dependent upon the distance the ant travels, so it has been seen that seeds are carried only short distances, at least when this method is compared to that of vertebrate or wind dispersal. While studies show that the soil in which leaf-cutter ants build their nests are favorable to plant growth, there is some debate among researchers whether collection by the leaf-cutter ants increases the actual rate at which germination occurs. However, seedlings are negatively affected by shade, and the soil under the parent tree. A. striatus removes the seed and deposits it at the nest, where conditions are sunny with favorable soil. Another benefit to being shipped by ants is escaping more natural predators., Ripe fruit containing seeds fall underneath the tree, and vertebrates will often search in these areas. If the ants get there first, seeds will escape organisms that would actually eat the seed.

== See also ==
- List of leafcutter ants
