= Amoimyrmex silvestrii =

Scientific classification
- Kingdom: Animalia
- Phylum: Arthropoda
- Clade: Pancrustacea
- Class: Insecta
- Order: Hymenoptera
- Family: Formicidae
- Subfamily: Myrmicinae
- Genus: Amoimyrmex
- Species: A. silvestrii

Binomial name
- Amoimyrmex silvestrii Emery, 1905

Species of ant

Amoimyrmex silvestrii is a species of leaf-cutter ant, a New World ant of the subfamily Myrmicinae of the genus Amoimyrmex. This species is from one of the two genera of advanced attines (fungus-growing ants) within the tribe Attini.

== Subspecies ==
- Amoimyrmex silvestrii bruchi

== See also ==
- List of leafcutter ants
