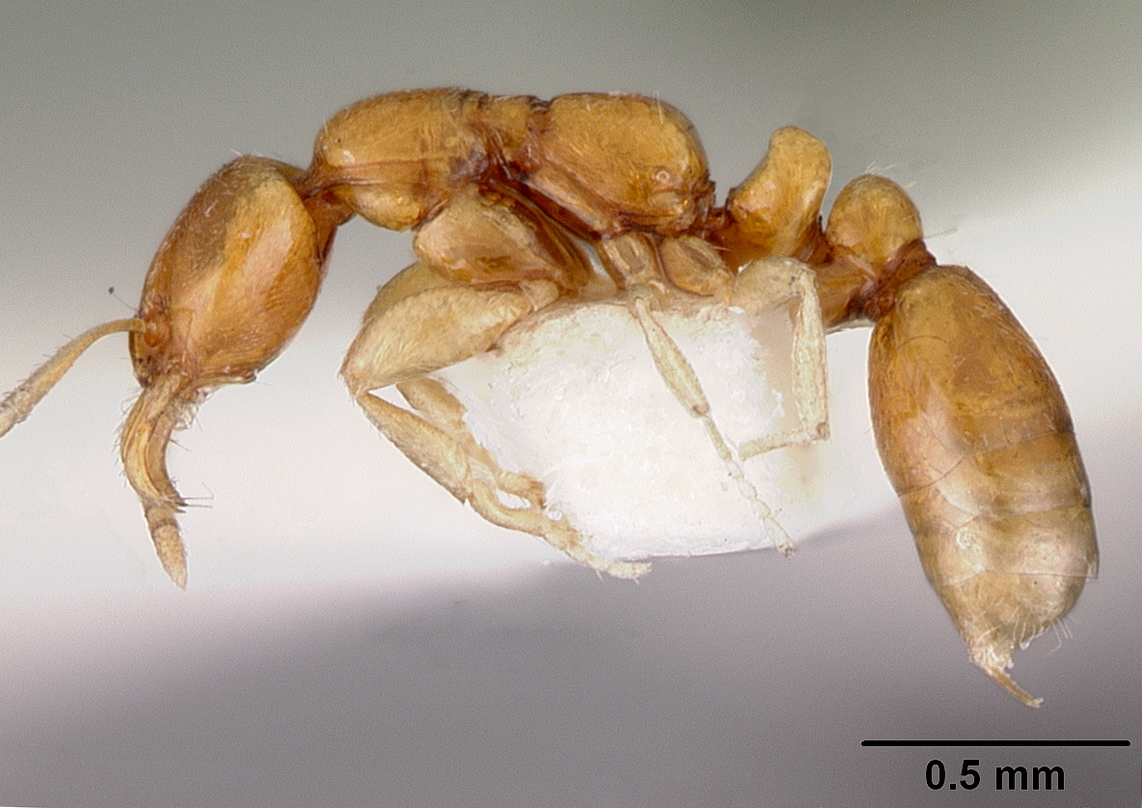
- Protanilla rafflesi worker

Scientific classification
- Kingdom: Animalia
- Phylum: Arthropoda
- Class: Insecta
- Order: Hymenoptera
- Family: Formicidae
- Subfamily: Leptanillinae
- Tribe: Leptanillini
- Genus: Protanilla; Taylor, 1990

Type species
- Protanilla rafflesi Taylor, 1990

Diversity
- 21 species

Synonyms
- Anomalomyrma Taylor, 1990; Furcotanilla Xu, 2012

= Protanilla =

Genus of ants

Protanilla is a genus of subterranean ants in the subfamily Leptanillinae. Known from the Indomalayan realm, the genus contains about thirteen species. The genus was erected by Taylor (1990) for the type species P. rafflesi, described from workers from Peninsular Malaysia. Species in this genus have long and downcurved mandibles with peg-like tooth on the inner margins. Four species are known from China (P. bicolor, P. concolor, P. gengma and P. tibeta), one from Taiwan (P. lini), one from Sri Lanka (P. schoedli) and a couple from India (P. wardi, P. flamma).

== Species ==
- Protanilla beijingensis Man et al., 2017
- Protanilla bicolor Xu, 2002
- Protanilla boltoni (Borowiec et al., 2011)
- Protanilla concolor Xu, 2002
- Protanilla eguchii Satria et al., 2023
- Protanilla flamma Baidya & Bagchi, 2020
- Protanilla furcomandibula Xu & Zhang, 2002
- Protanilla gengma Xu, 2012
- Protanilla helenae (Borowiec et al., 2011)
- Protanilla izanagi Terayama, 2013
- Protanilla jongi Hsu et al., 2017
- Protanilla lini Terayama, 2009
- Protanilla rafflesi Taylor, 1990
- Protanilla rong Griebenow et al., 2025
- Protanilla schoedli Baroni Urbani & De Andrade, 2006
- Protanilla shanyii Chen et al., 2025
- Protanilla taylori (Bolton, 1990)
- Protanilla tibeta Xu, 2012
- Protanilla wallacei Griebenow, 2024
- Protanilla wardi Bharti & Akbar, 2015
- Protanilla xui Chen et al., 2025
