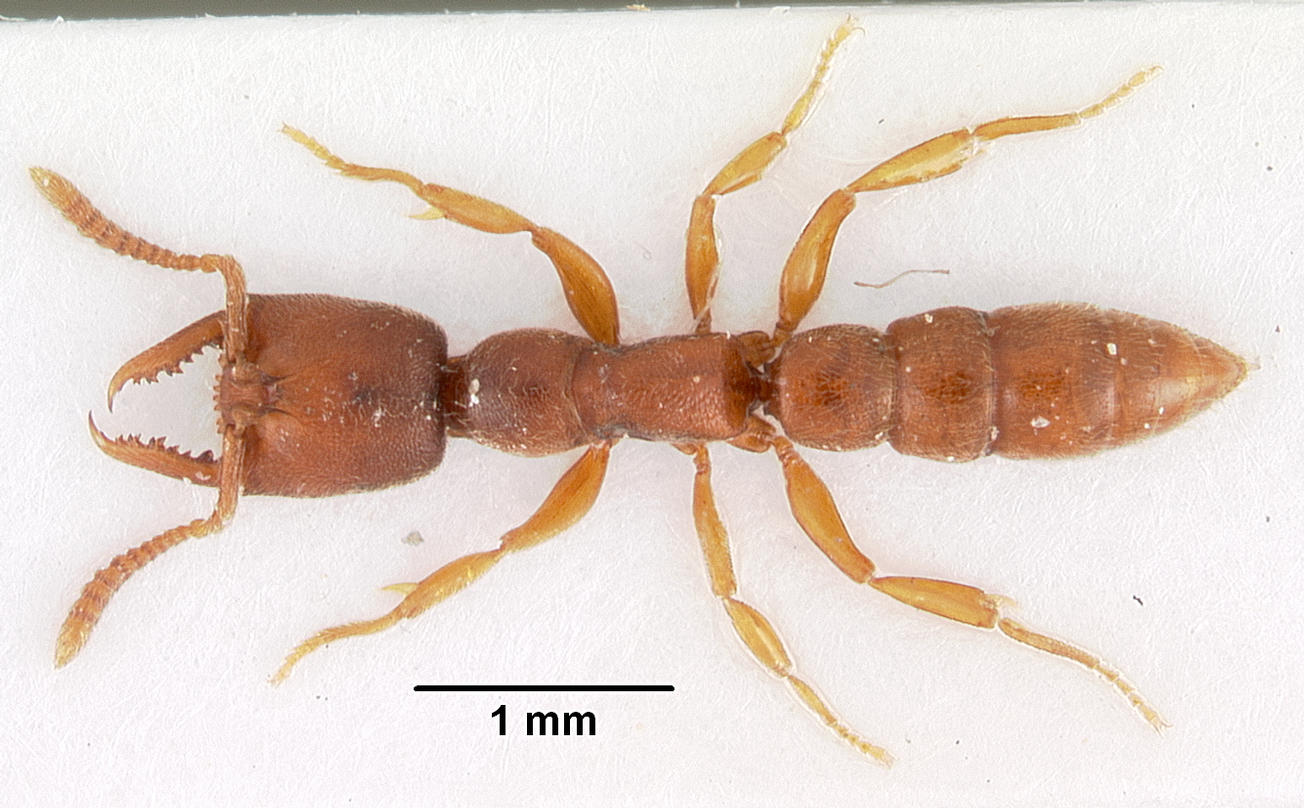
- Amblyopone silvestrii worker

Scientific classification
- Kingdom: Animalia
- Phylum: Arthropoda
- Class: Insecta
- Order: Hymenoptera
- Family: Formicidae
- Genus: Amblyopone
- Species: A. silvestrii

Binomial name
- Amblyopone silvestrii Wheeler, 1928

= Amblyopone silvestrii =

Species of ant

Amblyopone silvestrii is a primitive species of ant found in Japan. The species is known for larval hemolymph feeding (LHL), in which the queens stroke older larva with their antennae before piercing them with their mandibles. They then lower their mouth parts to the wound and lick up the hemolymph. Then, they cease movement for several minutes before dropping one or two white infrabuccal pellets while being groomed by worker nestmates who then carry the pellets away.

The queens are not the only vampires in the colony, as all adults will feed on the hemolymph of larvae, but the only source of nutrients the queen receives is the hemolymph of her brood. The brood fed upon are in their fifth instar of their larval stage, the last stage before becoming an adult ant. LHL scars often scars them, whether faintly or boldly, though it does not kill them. In higher ants, injured larvae are cannibalized. A. silvestrii, being a primitive species however, do not kill the injured larvae, unless the colony is starved. In this case, adult ants will cannibalize the most scarred larvae before the faintly scarred ones.
