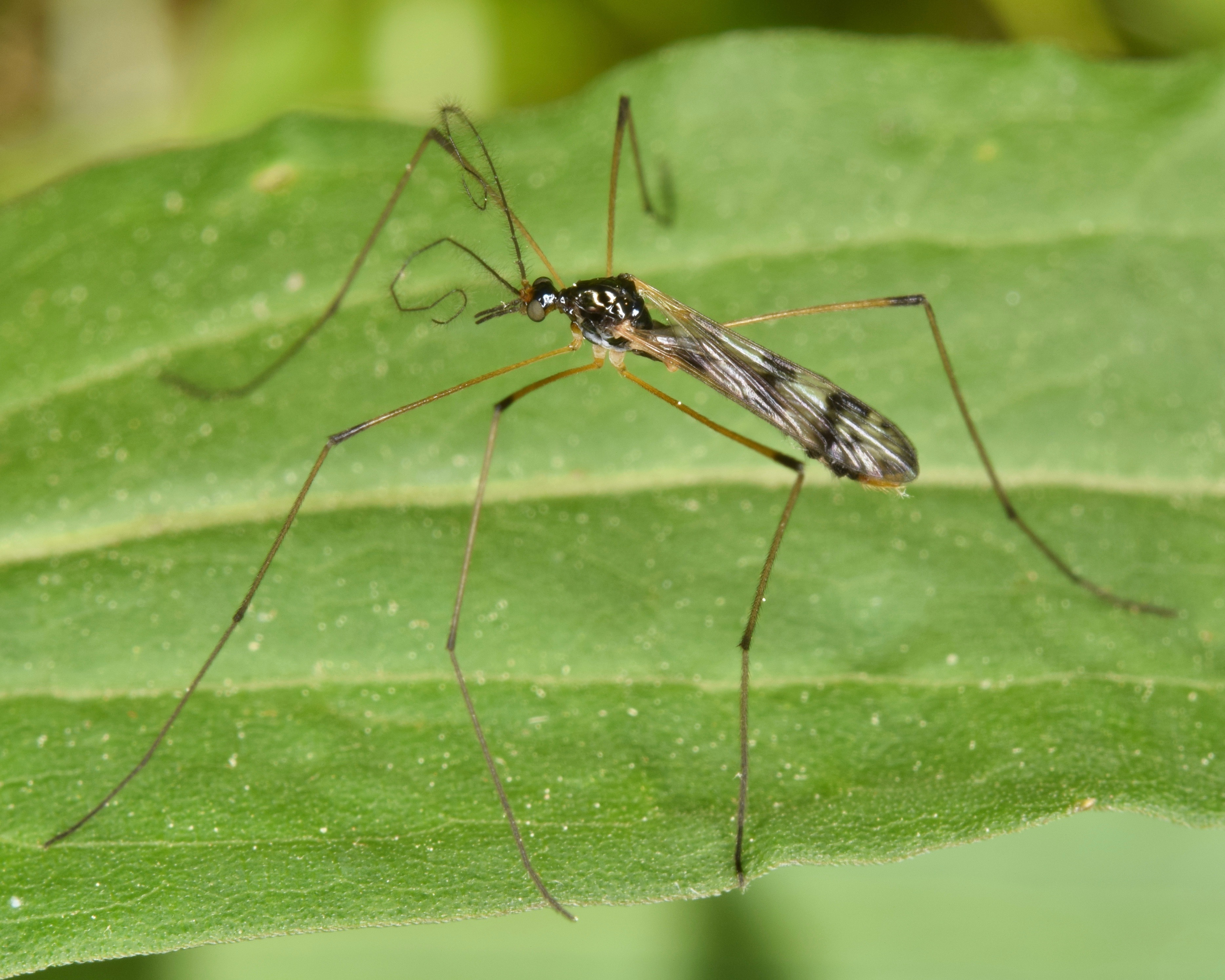

Scientific classification
- Domain: Eukaryota
- Kingdom: Animalia
- Phylum: Arthropoda
- Class: Insecta
- Order: Diptera
- Family: Limoniidae
- Genus: Limnophila
- Species: L. macrocera

Binomial name
- Limnophila macrocera (Say, 1823)

Synonyms
- Limnobia macrocera Say, 1823

= Limnophila macrocera =

Species of fly

Limnophila macrocera is a species of limoniid crane fly in the family Limoniidae.

== Subspecies ==
These two subspecies belong to the species Limnophila macrocera:

- Limnophila macrocera macrocera (Say, 1823)
- Limnophila macrocera suffusa Alexander, 1927
