= Apopyllus silvestrii =

Scientific classification
- Kingdom: Animalia
- Phylum: Arthropoda
- Subphylum: Chelicerata
- Class: Arachnida
- Order: Araneae
- Infraorder: Araneomorphae
- Family: Gnaphosidae
- Genus: Apopyllus
- Species: A. silvestrii

Binomial name
- Apopyllus silvestrii (Simon, 1905)

Species of spider

Apopyllus silvestrii is a spider species in the genus Apopyllus found in Peru, Bolivia, Brazil, Argentina and Chile.
