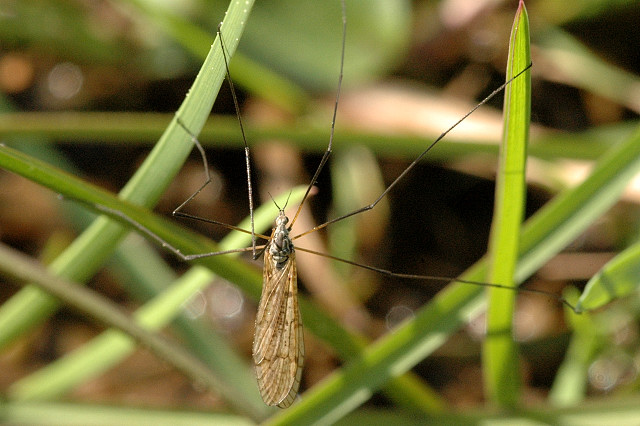

Scientific classification
- Kingdom: Animalia
- Phylum: Arthropoda
- Class: Insecta
- Order: Diptera
- Family: Limoniidae
- Genus: Limnophila
- Species: L. schranki

Binomial name
- Limnophila schranki Oosterbroek, 1992

= Limnophila schranki =

Species of fly

Limnophila schranki is a cranefly in the family Limoniidae.

It is a Palearctic species with a limited distribution in Europe. It is found in a wide range of habitats and micro habitats: in earth rich in humus, in swamps and marshes, along streams, in leaf litter and in wet spots in woods.
