= Leptanilla =

- L. swani queen and worker

Scientific classification
- Kingdom: Animalia
- Phylum: Arthropoda
- Class: Insecta
- Order: Hymenoptera
- Family: Formicidae
- Tribe: Leptanillini
- Genus: Leptanilla; Emery, 1870

Diversity
- 67 species

Synonyms
- Leptomesites Kutter, 1948; Phaulomyrma Wheeler & Wheeler, 1930; Noonilla Petersen, 1968; Yavnella Kugler, 1987; Scyphodon Brues, 1925

Genus of ants

Leptanilla is a genus of ant in the subfamily Leptanillinae. Like other genera in this subfamily, the queen is fed by the hemolymph of their own larvae, which have specialized processes for this purpose.

== Biology ==
Some species form colonies consisting of several hundred workers in the soil. They feed on small arthropods, including centipedes, and are rarely seen because they live underground and rarely come to the surface. In some species the queen is wingless, and new colonies form by budding from established colonies. Others have a nomadic life-style resembling that of army ants.

== Description ==
Leptanilla workers have no eyes, and are pale, yellow, and small.

== Distribution ==
Several species are found in North Africa, L. doderoi and L. revelierei in Corsica and Sardinia, L. havilandi and L. butteli in the Malay Peninsula, L. santschii in Java. L. swani and L. voldemort are the only two Australian species that have been described.

== Species ==
- Leptanilla acherontia Griebenow, 2024
- Leptanilla africana Baroni Urbani, 1977
- Leptanilla alexandri Dlussky, 1969
- Leptanilla anomala (Brues, 1925)
- Leptanilla argamani (Kugler, 1987)
- Leptanilla astylina Petersen, 1968
- Leptanilla australis Baroni Urbani, 1977
- Leptanilla beijingensis Qian et al., 2024
- Leptanilla belantan Griebenow et al., 2024
- Leptanilla belantanoides Griebenow et al., 2025
- Leptanilla besucheti Baroni Urbani, 1977
- Leptanilla bethyloides Griebenow et al., 2024
- Leptanilla bifurcata Kugler, 1987
- Leptanilla boltoni Baroni Urbani, 1977
- Leptanilla buddhista Baroni Urbani, 1977
- Leptanilla butteli Forel, 1913
- Leptanilla charonea Barandica et al., 1994
- Leptanilla clypeata Yamane & Ito, 2001
- Leptanilla copiosa (Petersen, 1968)
- Leptanilla dehongensis Qian et al., 2024
- Leptanilla doderoi Emery, 1915
- Leptanilla escheri (Kutter, 1948)
- Leptanilla exigua Santschi, 1908
- Leptanilla fuminorii Sasaki & Yamane, 2026
- Leptanilla havilandi Forel, 1901
- Leptanilla hunanensis Tang et al., 1992
- Leptanilla hypodracos Wong & Guénard, 2016
- Leptanilla indica (Kugler, 1987)
- Leptanilla islamica Baroni Urbani, 1977
- Leptanilla israelis Kugler, 1987
- Leptanilla japonica Baroni Urbani, 1977
- Leptanilla javana (Wheeler & Wheeler, 1930)
- Leptanilla judaica Kugler, 1987
- Leptanilla kebunraya Yamane & Ito, 2001
- Leptanilla kubotai Baroni Urbani, 1977
- Leptanilla kunmingensis Xu & Zhang, 2002
- Leptanilla lamellata Bharti & Kumar, 2012
- Leptanilla laventa (Griebenow et al., 2022)
- Leptanilla macauensis Leong et al., 2018
- Leptanilla minuscula Santschi, 1907
- Leptanilla morimotoi Yasumatsu, 1960
- Leptanilla najaphalla Griebenow et al., 2024
- Leptanilla nana Santschi, 1915
- Leptanilla oceanica Baroni Urbani, 1977
- Leptanilla okinawensis Terayama, 2013
- Leptanilla ortunoi López et al., 1994
- Leptanilla palauensis (Smith, 1953)
- Leptanilla phthirigyna Griebenow et al., 2025
- Leptanilla plutonia López et al., 1994
- Leptanilla poggii Mei, 1995
- Leptanilla qinlingensis Griebenow et al., 2024
- Leptanilla revelierii Emery, 1870
- Leptanilla sapa Yamada, 2025
- Leptanilla santschii Wheeler & Wheeler, 1930
- Leptanilla sichuanensis Zhong, 2024
- Leptanilla swani Wheeler, 1932
- Leptanilla taiwanensis Ogata et al., 1995
- Leptanilla tanakai Baroni Urbani, 1977
- Leptanilla tanit Santschi, 1907
- Leptanilla tenuis Santschi, 1907
- Leptanilla thai Baroni Urbani, 1977
- Leptanilla theryi Forel, 1903
- Leptanilla ujjalai Saroj et al., 2022
- Leptanilla vaucheri Emery, 1899
- Leptanilla voldemort Wong & McRae, 2024
- Leptanilla yunnanensis Xu, 2002
- Leptanilla zaballosi Barandica et al., 1994
