= Leptanillini =

- Leptanilla swani queen and worker

Scientific classification
- Domain: Eukaryota
- Kingdom: Animalia
- Phylum: Arthropoda
- Class: Insecta
- Order: Hymenoptera
- Family: Formicidae
- Subfamily: Leptanillinae
- Tribe: Leptanillini; Emery, 1910

Type genus
- Leptanilla

Diversity
- 2 genera

Tribe of ants

Leptanillini is a tribe of Leptanillinae ants with two extant genera.

== Genera ==
- Leptanilla Emery, 1870
- Protanilla Taylor, 1990
