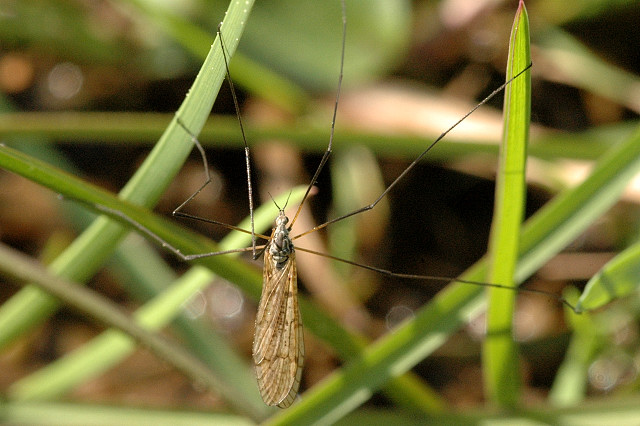
- Limnophila schranki

Scientific classification
- Kingdom: Animalia
- Phylum: Arthropoda
- Class: Insecta
- Order: Diptera
- Family: Limoniidae
- Subfamily: Limnophilinae
- Genus: Limnophila; Macquart, 1834

Type species
- L. pictipennis Meigen, 1818

Subgenus
- Araucolimnophila Alexander, 1940; Arctolimnophila Alexander, 1966; Atopolimnophila Alexander, 1972; Dasylimnophila Alexander, 1965; Dendrolimnophila Alexander, 1949; Elporiomyia Alexander, 1964; Habrolimnophila Alexander, 1968; Hesperolimnophila Alexander, 1966; Hovalimnophila Alexander, 1963; Idiolimnophila Alexander, 1934; Indolimnophila Alexander, 1968; Lasiomastix Osten Sacken, 1860; Limnophila Macquart, 1834; Nesolimnophila Alexander, 1920

Synonyms
- Limnomya Rondani, 1861; Poecilostola Schiner, 1863

= Limnophila (fly) =

Genus of flies

Limnophila is a genus of limoniid crane flies in the family Limoniidae. There are at least 280 described species in Limnophila.

Members of the family Limoniidae were previously in a subfamily of Tipulidae which was promoted to family rank.

== Species ==
- Subgenus Araucolimnophila Alexander, 1940

- L. wolffhuegeli Alexander, 1940

- Subgenus Arctolimnophila Alexander, 1966

- L. claggi Alexander, 1931
- L. subcostata (Alexander, 1911)

- Subgenus Atopolimnophila Alexander, 1972

- L. laricicola Alexander, 1912

- Subgenus Dasylimnophila Alexander, 1965

- L. stuckenbergiana Alexander, 1965
- L. velitor Alexander, 1951

- Subgenus Dendrolimnophila Alexander, 1949

- L. albomanicata (Alexander, 1945)
- L. shikokuensis Alexander, 1953

- Subgenus Elporiomyia Alexander, 1964

- L. breviterebra Alexander, 1965
- L. crepuscula Wood, 1952
- L. nox Alexander, 1921
- L. woodiana Alexander, 1964

- Subgenus Habrolimnophila Alexander, 1968

- L. celestissima (Alexander, 1945)

- Subgenus Hesperolimnophila Alexander, 1966

- L. euxesta Alexander, 1924
- L. nycteris Alexander, 1943
- L. rubida Alexander, 1924

- Subgenus Hovalimnophila Alexander, 1963

- L. malitiosa (Alexander, 1951)

- Subgenus Idiolimnophila Alexander, 1934

- L. emmelina Alexander, 1914

- Subgenus Indolimnophila Alexander, 1968

- L. adicia Alexander, 1964
- L. benguetana Alexander, 1931
- L. bituminosa Alexander, 1931
- L. bivittata Edwards, 1928
- L. dravidica Alexander, 1971
- L. iota Alexander, 1964
- L. iotoides Alexander, 1968
- L. manipurensis Alexander, 1942
- L. subguttularis Alexander, 1932

- Subgenus Lasiomastix Osten Sacken, 1860

- L. macrocera (Say, 1823)
- L. subtenuicornis (Alexander, 1918)
- L. tenuicornis Osten Sacken, 1869

- Subgenus Limnophila Macquart, 1834

- L. abstrusa Alexander, 1929
- L. acuspinosa Alexander, 1931
- L. allosoma Speiser, 1908
- L. alpica Alexander, 1929
- L. angularis Alexander, 1929
- L. angusticellula Alexander, 1931
- L. angustilineata Alexander, 1926
- L. antennella Alexander, 1929
- L. araucania Alexander, 1928
- L. arnoudi Theowald, 1971
- L. aureola Skuse, 1890
- L. austroalpina Alexander, 1929
- L. basalis (Walker, 1856)
- L. bathrogramma Alexander, 1929
- L. bogongensis Alexander, 1929
- L. borchi Alexander, 1929
- L. brachyptera Alexander, 1931
- L. brunneistigma Alexander, 1931
- L. bryobia Mik, 1881
- L. buangensis Alexander, 1933
- L. campbelliana Alexander, 1932
- L. cancellata Alexander, 1962
- L. carteri Alexander, 1922
- L. casta Alexander, 1928
- L. charis Alexander, 1955
- L. charon Alexander, 1937
- L. chinggiskhani Podenas & Gelhaus, 2001
- L. cingulipes Alexander, 1928
- L. circumscripta Alexander, 1934
- L. clavigera Alexander, 1934
- L. colophallus Alexander, 1967
- L. defecta Alexander, 1929
- L. dictyoptera Alexander, 1922
- L. difficilis Alexander, 1920
- L. disposita Skuse, 1890
- L. dorrigana Alexander, 1933
- L. edita Alexander, 1928
- L. effeta Alexander, 1922
- L. egena Alexander, 1928
- L. electa (Alexander, 1924)
- L. eutheta Alexander, 1936
- L. expressa Alexander, 1937
- L. filiformis Alexander, 1929
- L. flavissima Alexander, 1960
- L. fundata Alexander, 1928
- L. guttulatissima Alexander, 1913
- L. hemmingseniana (Alexander, 1978)
- L. hilli Alexander, 1929
- L. hoffmanniana Alexander, 1938
- L. humidicola Alexander, 1929
- L. imitatrix Skuse, 1890
- L. implicita Alexander, 1929
- L. inculta Alexander, 1929
- L. inordinata Skuse, 1890
- L. intonsa Alexander, 1928
- L. japonica Alexander, 1913
- L. jordanica Alexander, 1949
- L. jucunda Alexander, 1928
- L. kaieturana Alexander, 1930
- L. kershawi Alexander, 1928
- L. kerteszi Alexander, 1914
- L. latistyla Alexander, 1923
- L. lepida lepida Alexander, 1928
- L. lepida subtilis Alexander, 1944
- L. leucostigma Alexander, 1937
- L. levidensis Skuse, 1890
- L. litigiosa Alexander, 1928
- L. lloydi Alexander, 1913
- L. longicellula Alexander, 1931
- L. luctuosa Skuse, 1890
- L. luteicauda Alexander, 1924
- L. madida Alexander, 1928
- L. martynovi Alexander, 1933
- L. melica Alexander, 1929
- L. micromera Alexander, 1979
- L. mira Alexander, 1926
- L. mirabunda Alexander, 1928
- L. miroides Alexander, 1932
- L. mitocera Alexander, 1929
- L. mitoceroides Alexander, 1933
- L. morosa Alexander, 1928
- L. morula Alexander, 1928
- L. nebulicola Alexander, 1929
- L. nebulifera Alexander, 1923
- L. nematocera (Alexander, 1939)
- L. nemorivaga Alexander, 1929
- L. nitidiceps Alexander, 1928
- L. nixor Alexander, 1965
- L. nocticolor Alexander, 1929
- L. novella Alexander, 1928
- L. obscura Riedel, 1914
- L. obscuripennis Skuse, 1890
- L. ocellata Skuse, 1890
- L. oiticicai Alexander, 1948
- L. oliveri Alexander, 1923
- L. otwayensis Alexander, 1934
- L. pallidistyla Alexander, 1934
- L. pauciseta Alexander, 1924
- L. penana Alexander, 1967
- L. pergracilis Alexander, 1943
- L. perscita Alexander, 1926
- L. pictipennis (Meigen, 1818)
- L. pilosipennis Alexander, 1922
- L. platyna Alexander, 1952
- L. politostriata Alexander, 1934
- L. polymoroides Alexander, 1929
- L. procella Alexander, 1944
- L. pullipes Alexander, 1938
- L. quaesita Alexander, 1923
- L. recedens Alexander, 1931
- L. recta Alexander, 1928
- L. referta Alexander, 1928
- L. reniformis Alexander, 1934
- L. roraima Alexander, 1931
- L. roraimicola Alexander, 1931
- L. rubecula Alexander, 1944
- L. schadei Alexander, 1926
- L. schranki Oosterbroek, 1992
- L. scitula Alexander, 1926
- L. serena Alexander, 1928
- L. sikorai Alexander, 1921
- L. soldatovi Alexander, 1934
- L. spinulosa Alexander, 1946
- L. subapterogyne Alexander, 1928
- L. subcylindrica Alexander, 1928
- L. subjucunda Alexander, 1928
- L. subtristis Alexander, 1928
- L. suspecta Alexander, 1928
- L. tasioceroides Alexander, 1933
- L. theresiae Alexander, 1945
- L. tigriventris Alexander, 1928
- L. tonnoiri Alexander, 1926
- L. undulata Bellardi, 1861
- L. unispinifera Alexander, 1955
- L. varicornis Coquillett, 1898
- L. vera Alexander, 1933
- L. vicaria (Walker, 1835)

- Subgenus Nesolimnophila Alexander, 1920

- L. grandidieri Alexander, 1920
- L. luteifemorata Alexander, 1963
- L. malagasya Alexander, 1920

- Unplaced

- L. bigladia Alexander, 1945
- L. bryanti Alexander, 1927
- L. byersi Alexander, 1973
- L. canifrons Edwards, 1932
- L. chilensis Blanchard, 1852
- L. decasbila (Wiedemann, 1828)
- L. flavicauda (Bigot, 1888)
- L. galactopoda Alexander, 1943
- L. lobifera Alexander, 1955
- L. mcdunnoughi Alexander, 1926
- L. micropriapus Alexander, 1981
- L. nigrofemorata Alexander, 1927
- L. pectinifera Alexander, 1964
- L. poetica Osten Sacken, 1869
- L. subpilosa Edwards, 1928
- L. tetonicola Alexander, 1945

== See also ==
- List of Limnophila species
