= Leptanillinae =

- Leptanilla swani gyne and worker

Scientific classification
- Kingdom: Animalia
- Phylum: Arthropoda
- Class: Insecta
- Order: Hymenoptera
- Family: Formicidae
- Subfamily: Leptanillinae; Emery, 1910

Type genus
- Leptanilla Emery, 1870

Diversity
- 3 genera (50-60 species)

Subfamily of ants

Leptanillinae is a subfamily of primitive ants consisting of three genera.

Ants of this subfamily have larvae that feed their hemolymph to the queen through specialized processes on their prothoraces and third abdominal segments. This behavior resembles that of the distantly related Adetomyrma, also called the Dracula ant, which pierces their larvae to obtain body fluids.

Members of Leptanilla are minute, yellow, blind ants that live below the surface.

== Distribution ==
The Leptanillinae are mainly spread out in tropical and warm temperate regions in Europe and Australian regions.

== Subdivisions ==
- Leptanillini Emery, 1910
  - Leptanilla Emery, 1870
  - Protanilla Taylor, 1990
- Opamyrmini Boudinot & Griebenow, 2024
  - Opamyrma Yamane et al, 2008
