= List of organisms named after the Harry Potter series =

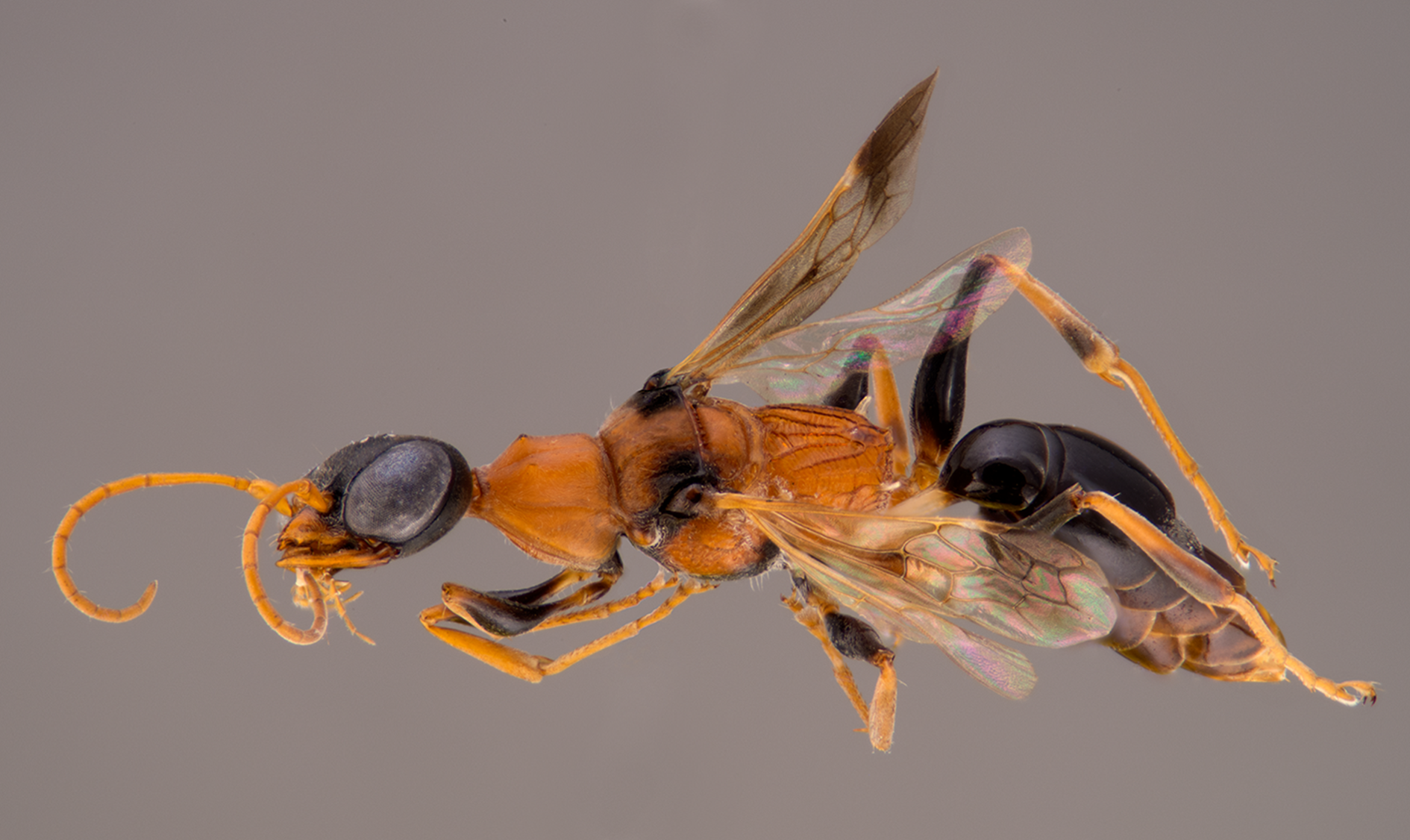
A female specimen of Ampulex dementor, named for dementors, magical creatures in the Harry Potter stories.

Newly created taxonomic names in biological nomenclature often reflect the discoverer's interests or honour those the discoverer holds in esteem. This is a list of real organisms with scientific names chosen to reference the fictional Harry Potter series by J.K. Rowling.

== Named after wizards ==
Taxon	Type	Named for	Notes	Ref
Eriovixia gryffindori Ahmed, Khalap & Sumukha, 2016	Orb-weaver spider	Sorting Hat & Godric Griffindor	"This uniquely shaped spider derives its name from the fabulous, sentient magical artifact, the sorting hat, owned by the (fictitious) medieval wizard Godric Gryffindor, one of the four founders of Hogwarts School of Witchcraft and Wizardry"	
Harryplax severus Mendoza & Ng, 2017	Pseudozioid crab	Harry Potter, Severus Snape	"The new genus is named primarily in honor of the intrepid field collector, the late Harry T. Conley, who collected many interesting crustaceans in the rubble beds of Guam, including the species presently being described. The name is also an allusion to a famous namesake, Harry Potter, the magical hero of the popular book series by J.K. Rowling, and Mr. Conley's uncanny ability to collect rare and interesting creatures as if by magic." "The specific epithet, severus (L., harsh, rough, rigorous), alludes to the rigorous and laborious process by which this crab was collected. It is also an allusion to a notorious and misunderstood character in the Harry Potter novels, Professor Severus Snape, for his ability to keep one of the most important secrets in the story, just like the present new species which has eluded discovery until now, nearly 20 years after it was first collected."	
Lusius malfoyi Saunders & Ward 2017	Wasp	Lucius Malfoy	"This species is named after Lucius Malfoy, a character in J. K. Rowling's Harry Potter stories, for two reasons. First, the study of parasitoid wasps can be described as an enjoyable and 'magical' experience. Second, the fictional namesake and his family have a sinister reputation in the Harry Potter stories. However, in the end their reputations are salvaged. This parallels the way in which many people view 'wasps' in a fearful way, even though only a small proportion of wasp species cause damage or harm."	
Leptanilla voldemort	Ant	Lord Voldemort	"The fearsome antagonists in Harry Potter and the Ant both have a ghostly and slender appearance and live in the shadows"	
Cardiomya minerva Carvalho de Lima, Oliveira & Absalão, 2020	Bivalve	Minerva McGonagall	"This species is named after the character Minerva McGonagall"	
Alastor moody Selis, 2020	Potter wasp	Alastor Moody	"The name of this species is dedicated to the fictional character Alastor Moody"	
Trimeresurus salazar Mirza et al., 2020	Pit viper	Salazar Slytherin	"The specific epithet is a noun in apposition for J.K. Rowling's fictional Hogwarts School of Witchcraft and Wizardry's co-founder, Salazar Slytherin. He was a Parselmouth that links him to serpents."	

== Named after magical creatures ==
Taxon	Type	Named for	Notes	Ref
Aname aragog Harvey et al, 2012	Trapdoor spider	Aragog	"This species is named for J. K. Rowling's fictional spider Aragog which first appeared in Harry Potter and the Chamber of Secrets."	
Ampulex dementor Ohl, 2014	Cockroach wasp	Dementor	"The new species is named after the 'dementors' [...] The dementor's fictional behavior and effects reminded us of the effect of the stinging behavior of Ampulex on the behavior of its cockroach prey. After being stung by the wasp, specific behaviors of the cockroach are inhibited (e.g. escape behavior) while others are unaffected (e.g. locomotion). The wasp grabs the partly paralyzed cockroach by one of the antennae and guides it to a suitable oviposition location, the prey following the wasp in a docile manner."	
Cis occamy Rosa-Oliveira & Lopes-Andrade, 2023	Minute tree-fungus beetle	Occamy	"The species name is inspired by the animal Occamy, from the story "Fantastic Beasts and Where to Find Them"."	
Thestral Faúndez & Rider, 2014	Stink bug	Thestral	"The ivory carinae and calluses on the dorsum of the new genus resemble the skeletal body of Rowling's thestral. Additionally, thestrals cannot be seen by everyone; the specimens of this new genus come from localities that have been fairly well collected, and yet the scarcity of specimens may be due to their not being easily seen by everyone."	
Leiocanthus nagini Sørensen et al, 2016	Kinorhynch	Nagini	"The species name, nagini, is the female version of Nāgá – the Sanskrit word for a group of divine dragons or serpent deities known from Hindu and Buddhist mythology. Nagini is furthermore Lord Voldemort's serpent, known from J. K. Rowling's Harry Potter novels."	
Graphorn Faúndez, Rider, & Carvajal, 2017	Stink bug	Graphorn	"Graphorn [...] from the fictional creature created by J.K. Rowling in the book 'Fantastic Beasts and Where to Find Them'. [...] These are known to have two large golden horns, similar to the humeral spines of this new genus. In addition, the crenulate pronotal margins and elevated pronotal disk resembles the large dorsal hump of the graphorns."	
Lycosa aragogi Nadolny & Zamani, 2017	Wolf spider	Aragog	"This species is named after Aragog, the famous fictional spider from "Harry Potter" book series by J.K. Rowling, in a reference to the similarities between this species and the animatronic puppet version of the character used in the film "Harry Potter and the Chamber of Secrets", which is actually based on a wolf spider."	
Attacobius demiguise Pereira-Filho, Saturnino & Bonaldo, 2018	Corinnid sac spider	Demiguise	"The Demiguise is described in the Magizoology compendium 'Fantastic Beasts and Where to Find Them' as being capable of making itself invisible when in danger. The name alludes to the behaviour of some Attacobius species, which appear to become invisible to ants while climbing onto their bodies."	
Ochyrocera aragogue Brescovit, Cizauskas & Mota, 2018	Spider	Aragog	"The specific name refers to Aragog, a spider capable of communicating with humans and a lover of human flesh"	
Macrobiotus naginae Vecchi et al., 2022	Tardigrade	Nagini	"Named after J. K. Rowling's Harry Potter book series character Nagini – Lord Voldemort's treasured snake companion. Formerly a cursed woman who is ultimately and irreversibly transformed into a limbless beast, this fictional character provides a fitting name for the new species in the pseudohufelandi complex, which in turn is characterized by reduced legs and claws."	

== Named after spells, objects, and locations ==
Taxon	Type	Named for	Notes	Ref
Macrocarpaea apparata J.R. Grant & Struwe	Gentianaceae	Apparating	"The term describes the magical ability to vanish and reappear at your destination (i.e. apparating). When we first found this new species, we could only find sterile individuals. After looking all afternoon, and only just before dusk, we finally found several flowering plants that seem to have 'apparated' in front of us, appearing out of nowhere."	
†Clevosaurus sectumsemper Bonaparte, 2015	Rhynchocephalian	Sectumsempra curse	"Latin meaning 'always cut', an allusion to the self-sharpening teeth that remain sharp by cutting against each other and the lower jaw throughout the animal's life." "It is also a nod to the Harry Potter character Severus Snape, who made a spell called sectumsempra."	
Metallactus bezoar Sassi, 2018	Leaf beetle	Bezoar	"A bezoar is an object believed to have the power of a universal antidote against any poison. The name is here used to recall the young wizard Harry Potter, the main character of a popular series of fantasy novels."	

== See also ==
- List of unusual biological names
- List of organisms named after works of fiction
- List of organisms named after famous people
