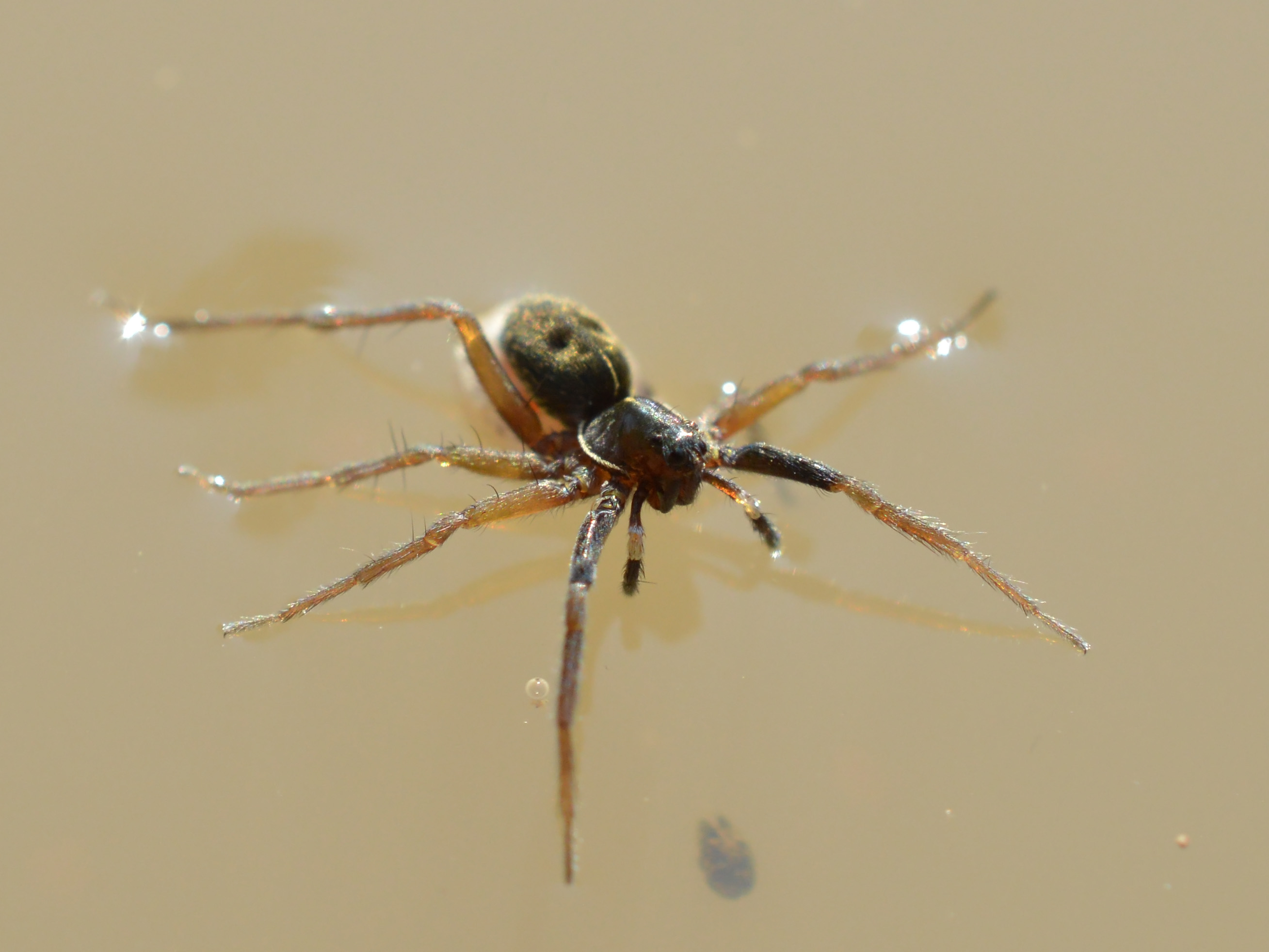
- female A. albimana
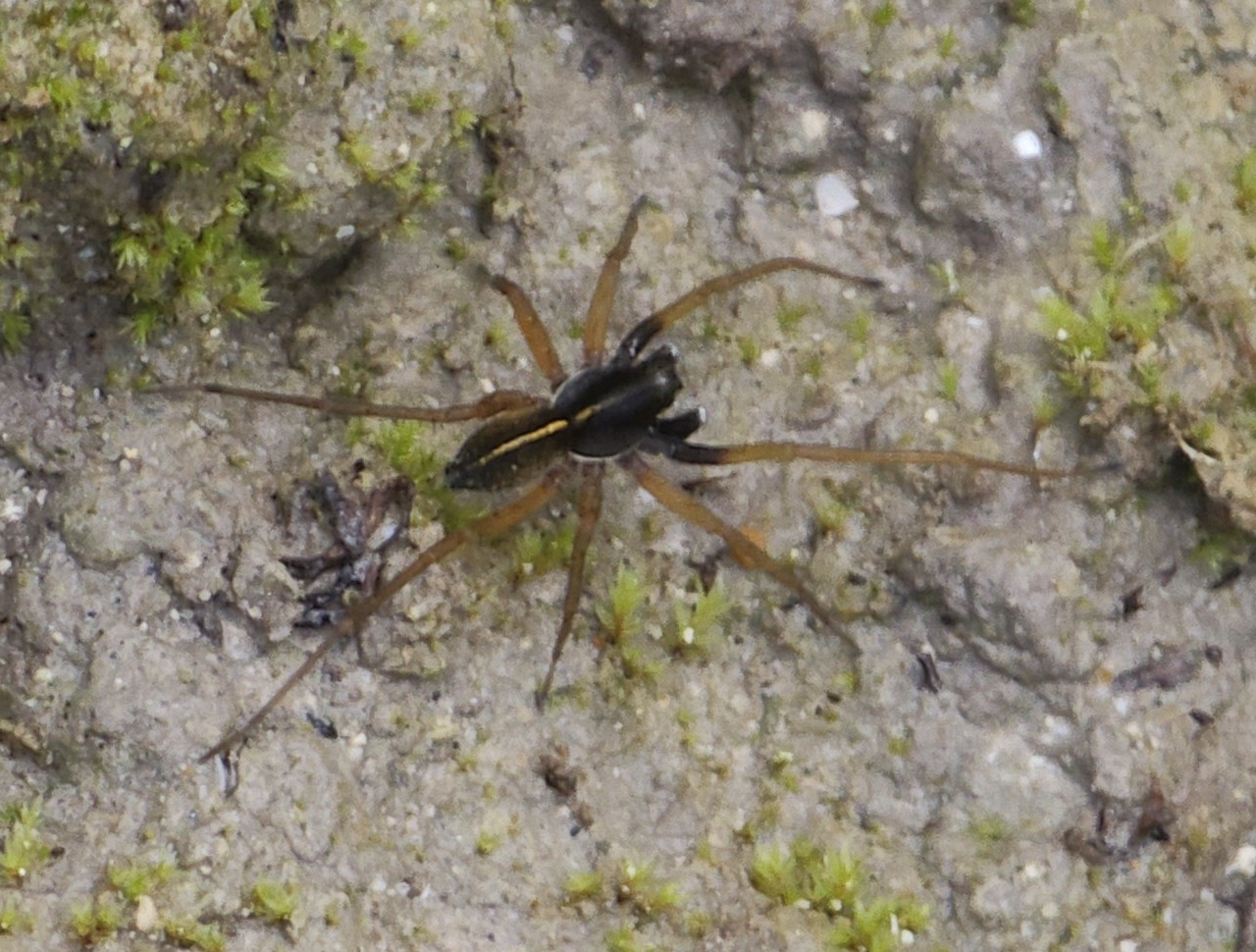
- male A. kratochvili

Scientific classification
- Kingdom: Animalia
- Phylum: Arthropoda
- Subphylum: Chelicerata
- Class: Arachnida
- Order: Araneae
- Infraorder: Araneomorphae
- Family: Lycosidae
- Genus: Aulonia; Koch, 1847

Species
- See text.

Synonyms
- Lycosa (Aulonia) Koch, 1847; Lycosina Simon, 1864

= Aulonia =

Genus of spiders

Aulonia is a genus of wolf spiders, family Lycosidae, first described as a subgenus by Carl Ludwig Koch in 1847. Its species are native from Europe to Central Asia.

== Taxonomy ==
In 1847, Carl Ludwig Koch created a subgenus of Lycosa, Lycosa (Aulonia), with the species Lycosa albimana. (Note: However, on page 16 of the index, published in 1851, Koch uses the name "Aulonia albimana" rather than "Lycosa (Aulonia) albimana".) In 1870, Tamerlan Thorell explicitly synonymized Koch's Lycosa subgenus Aulonia with the genus Aulonia, giving the type species as A. albimana. This treatment was followed in 1876 by Eugène Simon.

=== Species ===
As of October 2025, this genus included two species:

- Aulonia albimana (Walckenaer, 1805) – Europe, Turkey, Caucasus (type species)
- Aulonia kratochvili Dunin, Buchar & Absolon, 1986 – Greece, Cyprus, Turkey, Israel, Georgia, Azerbaijan, Iran, Turkmenistan
