= Lycosa bistriata =

Scientific classification
- Kingdom: Animalia
- Phylum: Arthropoda
- Subphylum: Chelicerata
- Class: Arachnida
- Order: Araneae
- Infraorder: Araneomorphae
- Family: Lycosidae
- Genus: Lycosa
- Species: L. bistriata

Binomial name
- Lycosa bistriata Gravely, 1924

Species of spider

Lycosa bistriata is a species of spiders of the genus Lycosa found in India and Bhutan. Males of this spider species exhibit different leg colouration. Of these one group of male spider resembles the female in coloration where as the other group the has black colour leg while the upper surface of tarsus is covered by thick white hair.
