= Lycosa perspicua =

Cape Town Lycosa Wolf Spider

Scientific classification
- Kingdom: Animalia
- Phylum: Arthropoda
- Subphylum: Chelicerata
- Class: Arachnida
- Order: Araneae
- Infraorder: Araneomorphae
- Family: Lycosidae
- Genus: Lycosa
- Species: L. perspicua

Binomial name
- Lycosa perspicua Roewer, 1960

Species of spider

Lycosa perspicua is a species of spider in the family Lycosidae. It is endemic to the Western Cape in South Africa and is commonly known as the Cape Town Lycosa wolf spider.

== Distribution ==
Lycosa perspicua is found in South Africa. In South Africa, it is known only from the type locality Cape Town at 7 m altitude.

== Habitat and ecology ==
Lycosa perspicua inhabits the Fynbos biome. These are free-living ground dwellers that live in open burrows.

== Conservation ==
Lycosa perspicua is listed as Data Deficient for Taxonomic reasons by the South African National Biodiversity Institute. The status of the species remains obscure and additional sampling is needed to collect the female and to determine the species' range.

== Taxonomy ==
Lycosa perspicua was described by Roewer in 1960 from Cape Town. The species has not been revised and is known only from the male.
