= Lycosa pachana =

East African Lycosa Wolf Spider

Scientific classification
- Kingdom: Animalia
- Phylum: Arthropoda
- Subphylum: Chelicerata
- Class: Arachnida
- Order: Araneae
- Infraorder: Araneomorphae
- Family: Lycosidae
- Genus: Lycosa
- Species: L. pachana

Binomial name
- Lycosa pachana Pocock, 1898

Species of spider

Lycosa pachana is a species of spider in the family Lycosidae. It is found in Africa and is commonly known as the East African Lycosa wolf spider.

== Distribution ==
Lycosa pachana is found in Malawi, Zimbabwe, and South Africa.

The species was originally described from Karagesi, Malawi. In South Africa, it is recorded from the four provinces Gauteng, KwaZulu-Natal, Mpumalanga, and North West at altitudes ranging from 17 to 1698 m.

== Habitat and ecology ==
Lycosa pachana inhabits the Grassland and Savanna biomes. These are ground dwellers that live in open burrows.

== Conservation ==
Lycosa pachana is listed as Least Concern by the South African National Biodiversity Institute. There are no significant threats to the species and due to its wide geographical range, it is therefore listed as being of Least Concern. Additional sampling is needed to collect the male.

== Taxonomy ==
Lycosa pachana was originally described by Pocock in 1898. The species was revised by Roewer in 1960 and is known only from the female.
