= Lycosa capensis =

Cape Lycosa Wolf Spider

Scientific classification
- Kingdom: Animalia
- Phylum: Arthropoda
- Subphylum: Chelicerata
- Class: Arachnida
- Order: Araneae
- Infraorder: Araneomorphae
- Family: Lycosidae
- Genus: Lycosa
- Species: L. capensis

Binomial name
- Lycosa capensis Simon, 1898

Species of spider

Lycosa capensis is a species of spider in the family Lycosidae. It is endemic to South Africa and is commonly known as the Cape Lycosa wolf spider.

== Distribution ==
Lycosa capensis is found in South Africa. The type locality is given only as "Prom. Bonae Spei" (Cape of Good Hope), without an exact location.

== Habitat and ecology ==
Lycosa capensis is a ground-dwelling spider.

== Conservation ==
Lycosa capensis is listed as Data Deficient by the South African National Biodiversity Institute. The status of the species remains obscure and additional sampling is needed to determine the species' range.

== Taxonomy ==
Lycosa capensis was originally described by Eugène Simon in 1898. The species was revised by Roewer in 1960 and is known from both sexes.
