= Thestral (bug) =

Scientific classification
- Kingdom: Animalia
- Phylum: Arthropoda
- Clade: Pancrustacea
- Class: Insecta
- Order: Hemiptera
- Suborder: Heteroptera
- Family: Pentatomidae
- Tribe: Carpocorini
- Genus: Thestral; Faúndez & Rider, 2014

Type species
- Thestral incognitus Faúndez & Rider, 2014

Genus of true bugs

Thestral is a genus of shield bug found in central Chile. As of 2018, it is monospecific, just consisting its type species T. incognitus.

The genus is named after the thestrals, a fictional horse-like creature from J.K. Rowling's Harry Potter series. The fictional animal has a skeletal body and is unable to be seen by the majority of people; Faúndez & Rider chose this name for the genus due to the bug's ivory coloring and scarcity of specimens.

== See also ==
- List of organisms named after the Harry Potter series
