= Lycosa rimicola =

Northern Cape Lycosa Wolf Spider

Scientific classification
- Kingdom: Animalia
- Phylum: Arthropoda
- Subphylum: Chelicerata
- Class: Arachnida
- Order: Araneae
- Infraorder: Araneomorphae
- Family: Lycosidae
- Genus: Lycosa
- Species: L. rimicola

Binomial name
- Lycosa rimicola Purcell, 1903

Species of spider

Lycosa rimicola is a species of spider in the family Lycosidae. It is found in South Africa and is commonly known as the Northern Cape Lycosa wolf spider.

== Distribution ==
Lycosa rimicola is found in South Africa. In South Africa, it is known from the Northern Cape and Western Cape. The type series was collected prior to 1903 from Hanover and three farms around Hanover in the Northern Cape, and the species is also known from Franshoek in the Western Cape. The species occurs at altitudes ranging from 227 to 1387 m.

== Habitat and ecology ==
Lycosa rimicola inhabits the Nama Karoo biome. These are ground dwellers that live in open burrows.

== Description ==
The abdomen is ventrally black.

== Conservation ==
Lycosa rimicola is listed as Data Deficient by the South African National Biodiversity Institute. Additional sampling is needed to determine the species' range. There are no known threats to the species.

== Taxonomy ==
Lycosa rimicola was originally described by Purcell in 1903. The species was revised by Roewer in 1960 and is known from both sexes.
