= Lycosa gigantea =

Rustenburg Lycosa Wolf Spider

Scientific classification
- Kingdom: Animalia
- Phylum: Arthropoda
- Subphylum: Chelicerata
- Class: Arachnida
- Order: Araneae
- Infraorder: Araneomorphae
- Family: Lycosidae
- Genus: Lycosa
- Species: L. gigantea

Binomial name
- Lycosa gigantea (Roewer, 1960)

Synonyms
- Allohogna gigantea Roewer, 1960

Species of spider

Lycosa gigantea is a species of spider in the family Lycosidae. It is endemic to South Africa and is commonly known as the Rustenburg Lycosa wolf spider.

== Distribution ==
Lycosa gigantea is known only from the type locality Rustenburg in the South African province North West at 1171 m altitude.

== Habitat and ecology ==
Lycosa gigantea inhabits the Savanna biome. These are free-living ground dwellers that live in open burrows.

== Conservation ==
Lycosa gigantea is listed as Data Deficient for Taxonomic reasons by the South African National Biodiversity Institute. The status of the species remains obscure and additional sampling is needed to collect the male and to determine the species' range.

== Taxonomy ==
Lycosa gigantea was originally described by Roewer in 1960 as Allohogna gigantea from Rustenburg. The species has not been revised and is known only from the female.
