= Lusius flummox =

Scientific classification
- Domain: Eukaryota
- Kingdom: Animalia
- Phylum: Arthropoda
- Class: Insecta
- Order: Hymenoptera
- Family: Ichneumonidae
- Genus: Lusius
- Species: L. flummox

Binomial name
- Lusius flummox Rousse & van Noort, 2013

Species of wasp

Lusius flummox is a parasitoid wasp found in Uganda and possibly Nigeria. The species is similar in appearance to Lusius tenuissimus, and the precise relationship between the species has yet to be determined. The etymology of the specific name is the word "flummox", in reference to the difficulty of assigning this species to a genus. It was first described by Pascal Rousse and Simon van Noort in 2013.
