= Lycosa indagatrix =

Scientific classification
- Kingdom: Animalia
- Phylum: Arthropoda
- Subphylum: Chelicerata
- Class: Arachnida
- Order: Araneae
- Infraorder: Araneomorphae
- Family: Lycosidae
- Genus: Lycosa
- Species: L. indagatrix

Binomial name
- Lycosa indagatrix Walckenaer, 1837

Synonyms
- Hogna indagairix Walckenaer, 1837

Species of spider

Lycosa indagatrix is a species of spiders of the genus Lycosa native to India and Sri Lanka. The species is about 22 mm (5/6 in) long. The habitats include tunnels and burrows and it is a purely nocturnal spider.
