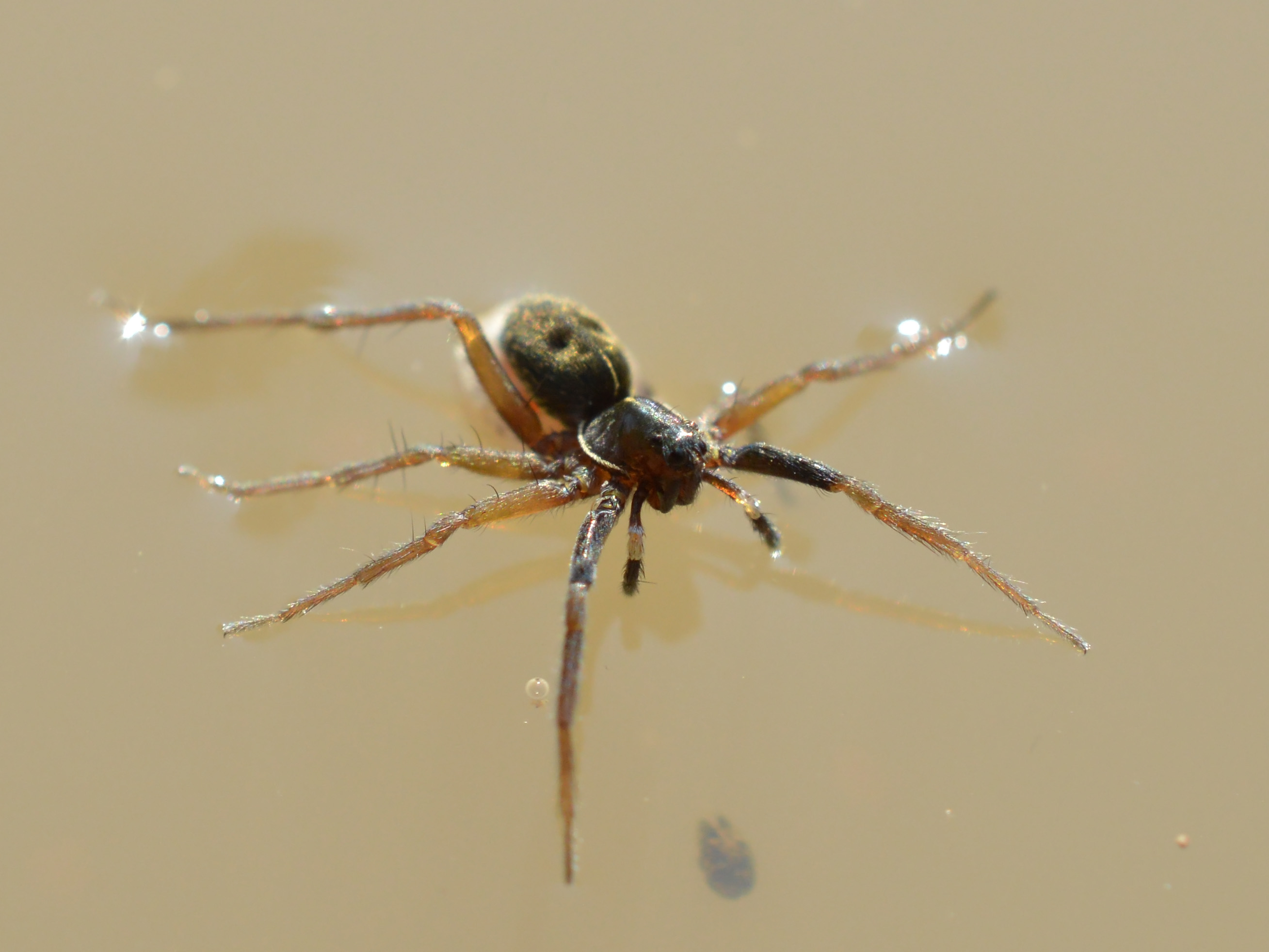
- Female with egg sac on water
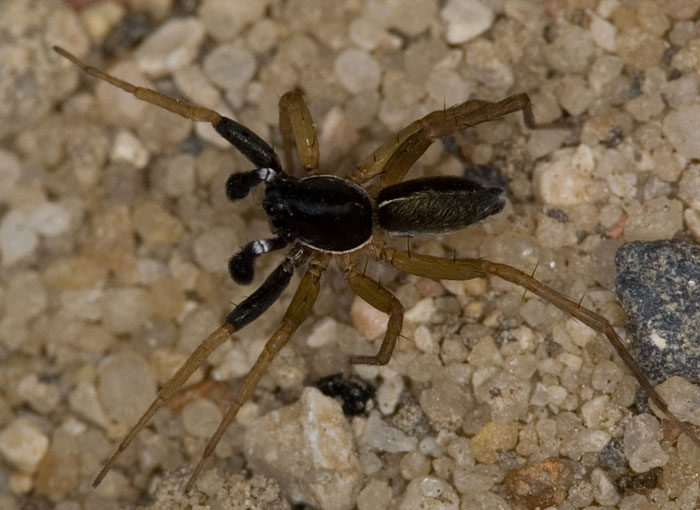
- Male

Scientific classification
- Kingdom: Animalia
- Phylum: Arthropoda
- Subphylum: Chelicerata
- Class: Arachnida
- Order: Araneae
- Infraorder: Araneomorphae
- Family: Lycosidae
- Genus: Aulonia
- Species: A. albimana

Binomial name
- Aulonia albimana (Walckenaer, 1805)

Synonyms
- Lycosa albimana Walckenaer, 1805

= Aulonia albimana =

Species of wolf spiders

Aulonia albimana is a mainly European species of wolf spider (family Lycosidae). It was first described as Lycosa albimana by Charles Walckenaer in his 1805 treatise on spiders.

== Taxonomy ==
Aulonia albimana was first described in 1805 by Charles Walckenaer as Lycosa albimana. The species name albimana is derived from the Latin words albus, "white", and manus, "hand", meaning "white-handed". In 1847, Carl Ludwig Koch described a new Lycosa subgenus, L. (Aulonia). In his description he used the name Aulonia albimana. In 1870, Tamerlan Thorell explicitly synonymized Koch's Lycosa subgenus Aulonia with the genus Aulonia, giving the type species as A. albimana.

== Description ==
Aulonia albimana has a body length of around 4 mm. Females may reach 4.5 mm; males usually only 3.5 mm. Both sexes are similar in overall appearance. The prosoma is dark brown with a narrow white border. The legs are of a light yellow with black first femurs. The opisthosoma is dark brown with some light hairs in front and sometimes some light hair tufts at the back. The palps have white patellae which form a striking contrast with the black tibiae and femurs.

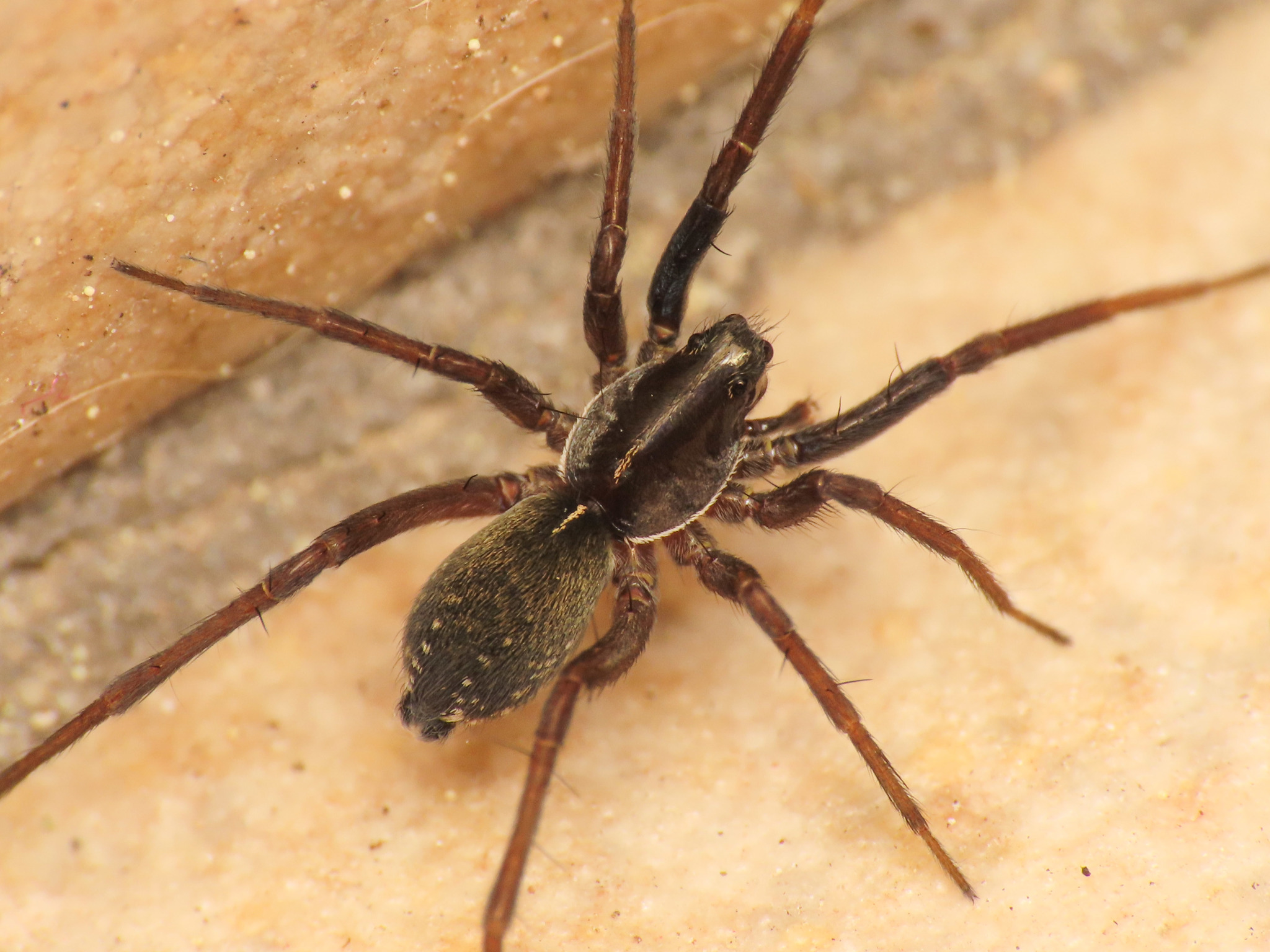
female

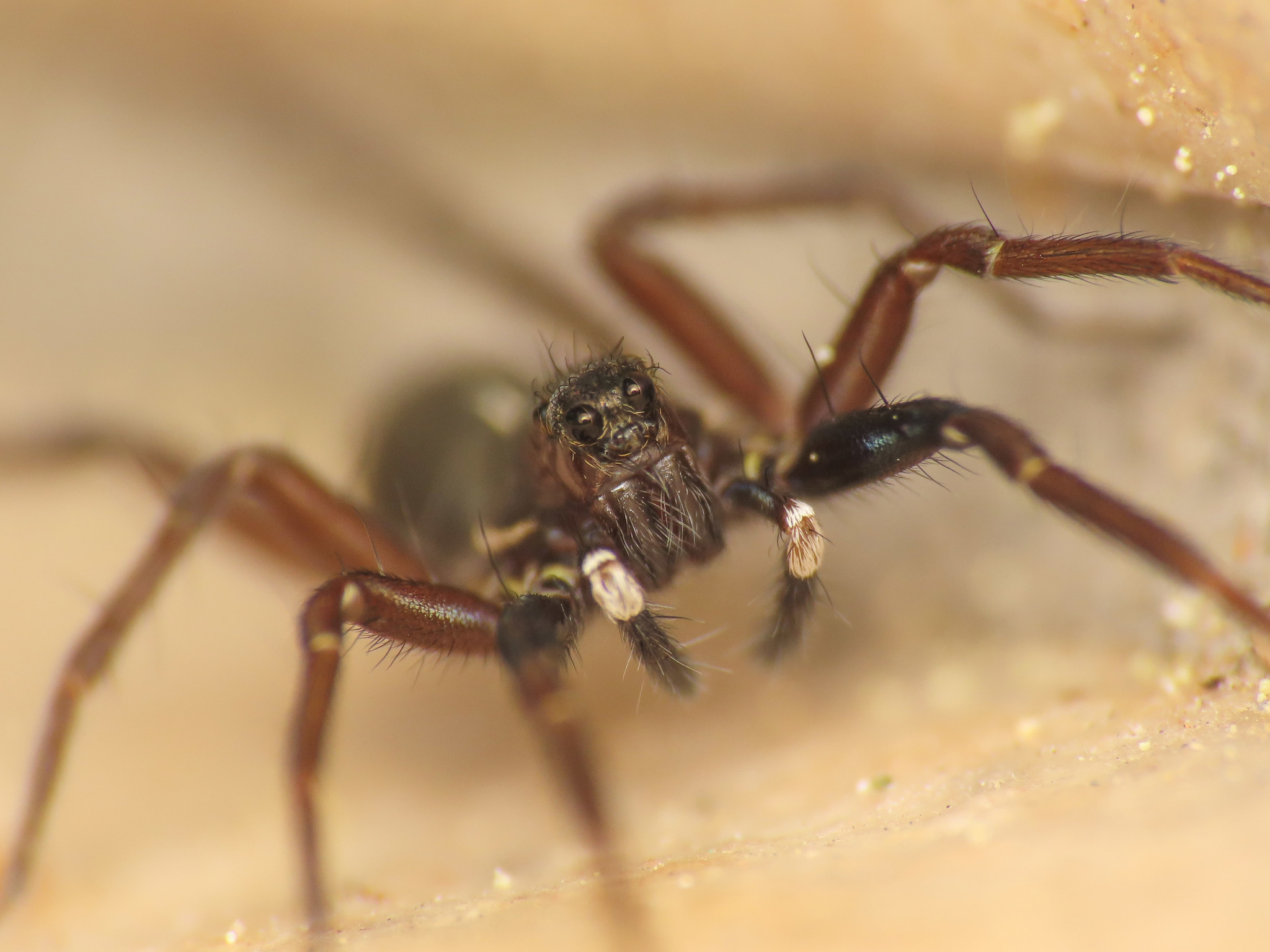
female

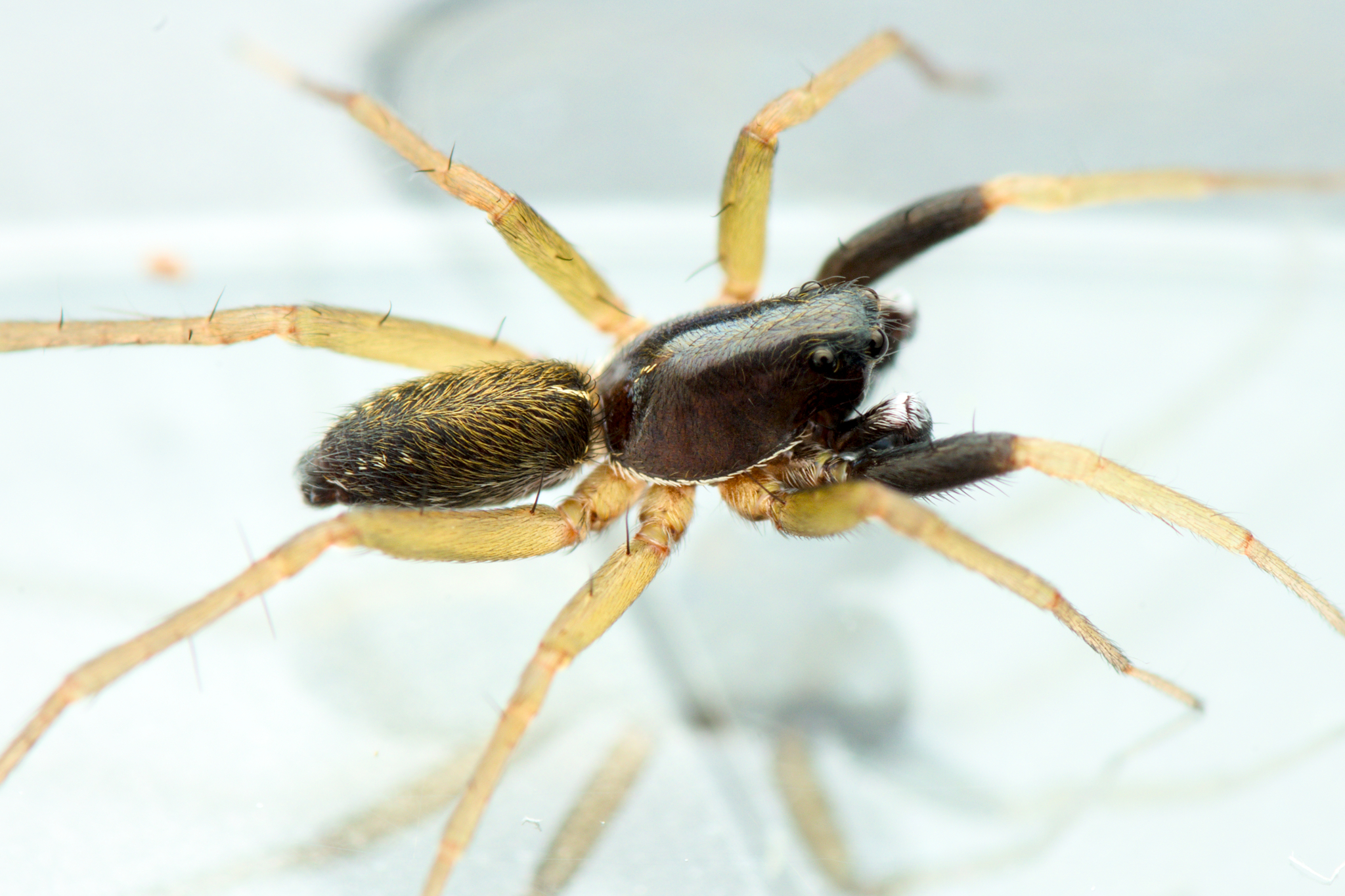
male

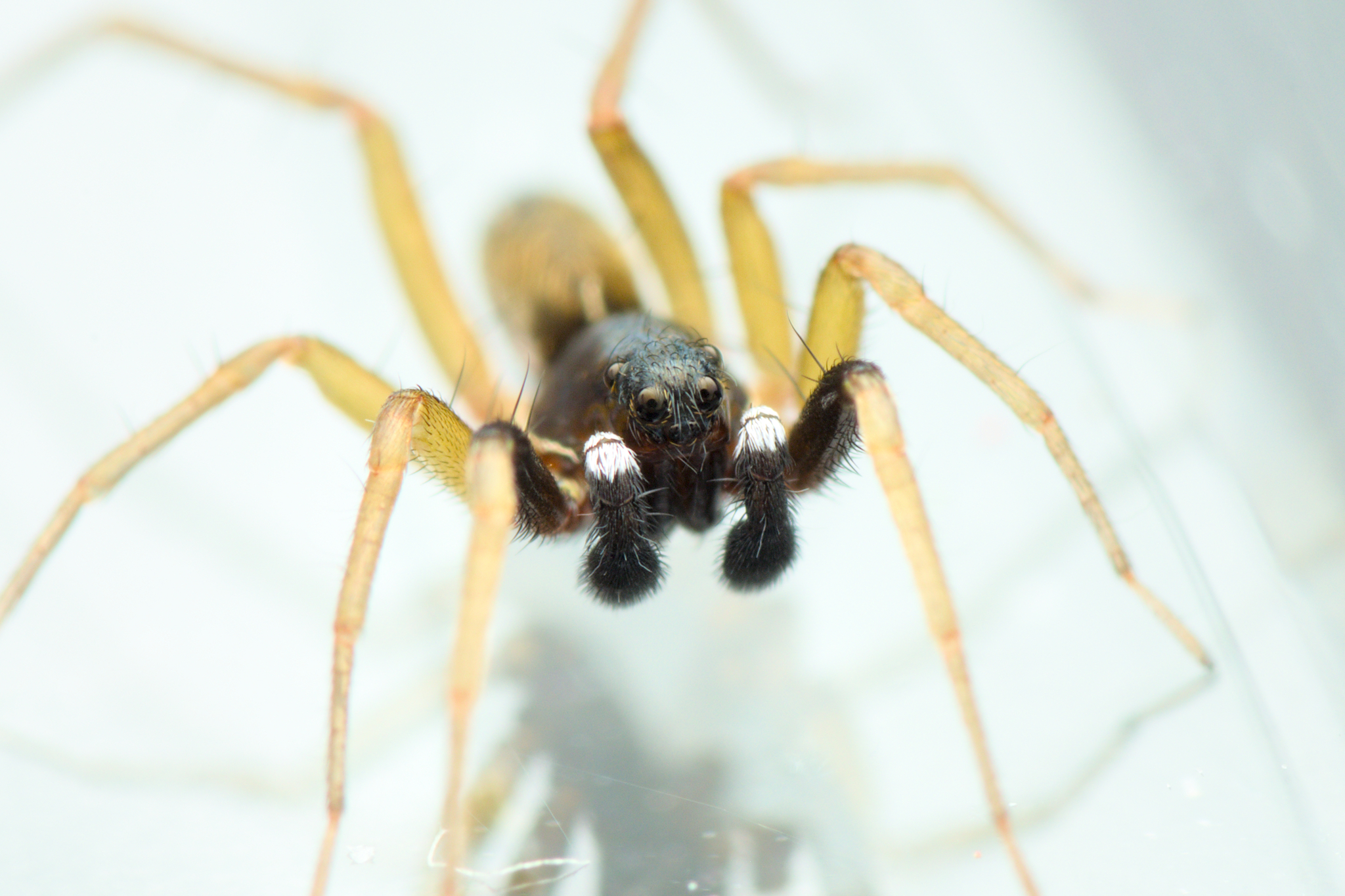
male

== Distribution and habitat ==
A. albimana is native to Europe, Turkey and the Caucasus. It is found under rocks and in moss at sunny and dry locations.

=== Rediscovery in England ===
In October 2025, it was reported that Aulonia albimana had been found at the Newtown nature reserve on the Isle of Wight, England, after not being recorded in the United Kingdom since 1985. It was informally named "white-knuckled wolf spider", alluding both to the pale "knuckles" on its pedipalps and to the fact that it was found in the closing minutes of a time-limited boat trip to an otherwise inaccessible part of the reserve. It had previously been recorded in the 1930s and between 1963 and 1974 at two quarries near Dunster, Somerset, but these habitats had since been destroyed by use as rubbish tips.

== Status ==
A 2017 report on "scarce and threatened spiders (Araneae) of Great Britain" identified Aulonia albimana as Critically endangered and "Nationally rare".
