= Lycosa yerburyi =

Scientific classification
- Kingdom: Animalia
- Phylum: Arthropoda
- Subphylum: Chelicerata
- Class: Arachnida
- Order: Araneae
- Infraorder: Araneomorphae
- Family: Lycosidae
- Genus: Lycosa
- Species: L. yerburyi

Binomial name
- Lycosa yerburyi Pocock, 1901

Species of spider

Lycosa yerburyi, is a species of spider of the genus Lycosa. It is endemic to Sri Lanka.

It is named after the collector of the type specimen, John William Yerbury.
