= Lycosa dacica =

Scientific classification
- Kingdom: Animalia
- Phylum: Arthropoda
- Subphylum: Chelicerata
- Class: Arachnida
- Order: Araneae
- Infraorder: Araneomorphae
- Family: Lycosidae
- Genus: Lycosa
- Species: L. dacica

Binomial name
- Lycosa dacica (Pavesi, 1898)

Species of spider

Lycosa dacica is a wolf spider species found in Romania. It was first described by Pavesi in 1898. According to the Catalogue of Life species Lycosa dacica does not have known subspecies.
