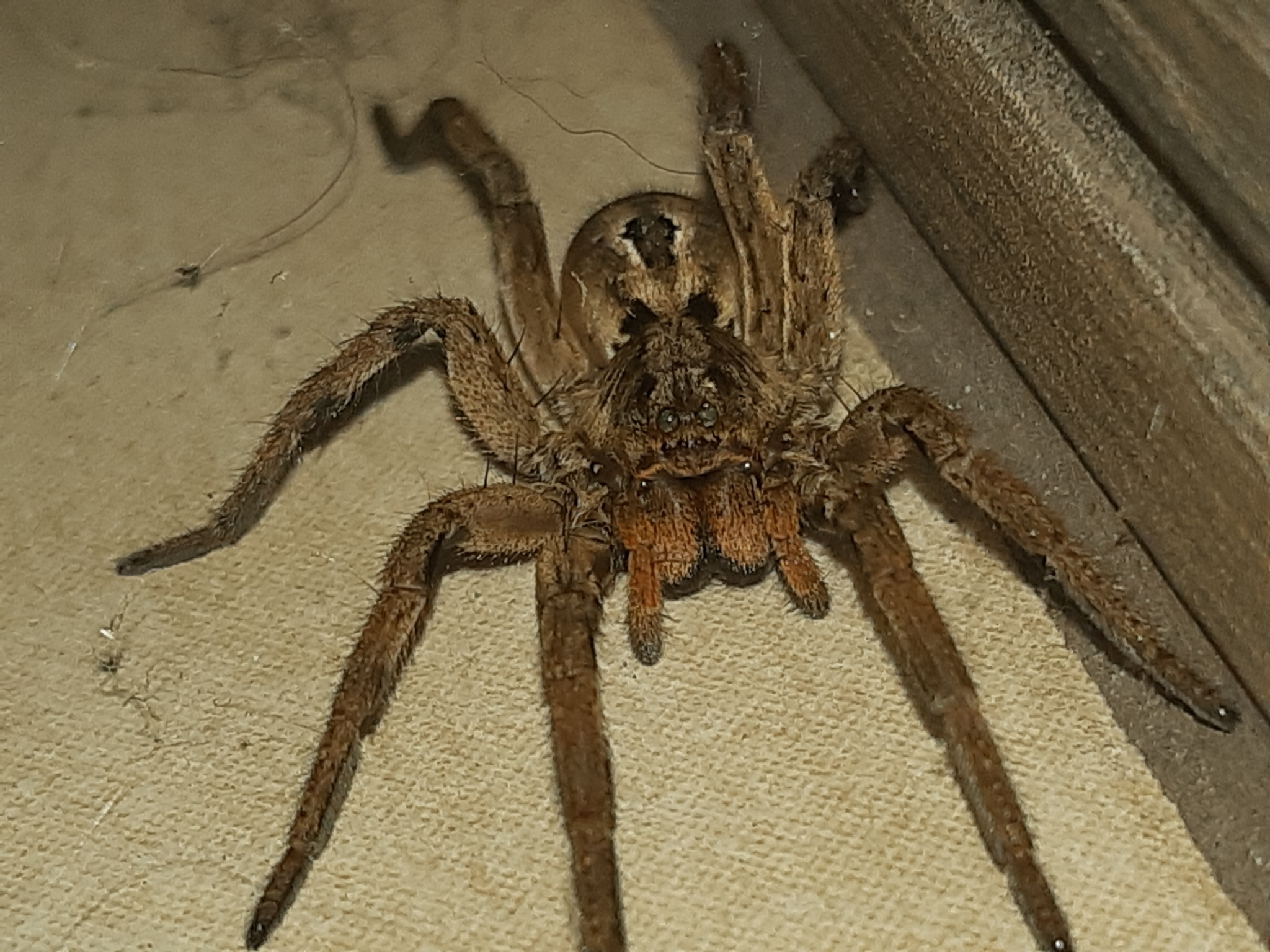

Scientific classification
- Kingdom: Animalia
- Phylum: Arthropoda
- Subphylum: Chelicerata
- Class: Arachnida
- Order: Araneae
- Infraorder: Araneomorphae
- Family: Lycosidae
- Genus: Lycosa
- Species: L. erythrognatha

Binomial name
- Lycosa erythrognatha Lucas, 1836

Synonyms
- Lycosa raptoria Walckenaer, 1837; Lycosa erythrostoma C.L. Koch, 1847; Lycosa rufimana C.L. Koch, 1847; Tarentula erythrostoma (C.L. Koch, 1847); Tarentula rufimana (C.L. Koch, 1847); Leimonia raptoria (Walckenaer, 1837); Tarentula raptoria (Walckenaer, 1837); Scaptocosa raptoria (Walckenaer, 1837)

= Lycosa erythrognatha =

Species of spider

Lycosa erythrognatha is a species of spider from the genus Lycosa. The species was originally described in 1836. It is the only spider known to feed on Rhinella ornata.

== Venom ==
Beginning in the 1920s, the venom of this species has been erroneously reported to cause necrosis in humans, based on undocumented clinical observations; careful empirical studies revealed that none of over 500 confirmed bites from this spider resulted in a necrotic wound.
