= Lycosa howarthi =

Scientific classification
- Kingdom: Animalia
- Phylum: Arthropoda
- Subphylum: Chelicerata
- Class: Arachnida
- Order: Araneae
- Infraorder: Araneomorphae
- Family: Lycosidae
- Genus: Lycosa
- Species: L. howarthi

Binomial name
- Lycosa howarthi Gertsch, 1973

Species of spider

Lycosa howarthi, the small-eyed big-eyed hunting spider, is a species of spider that lives in the volcanic caves of Hawaii.
