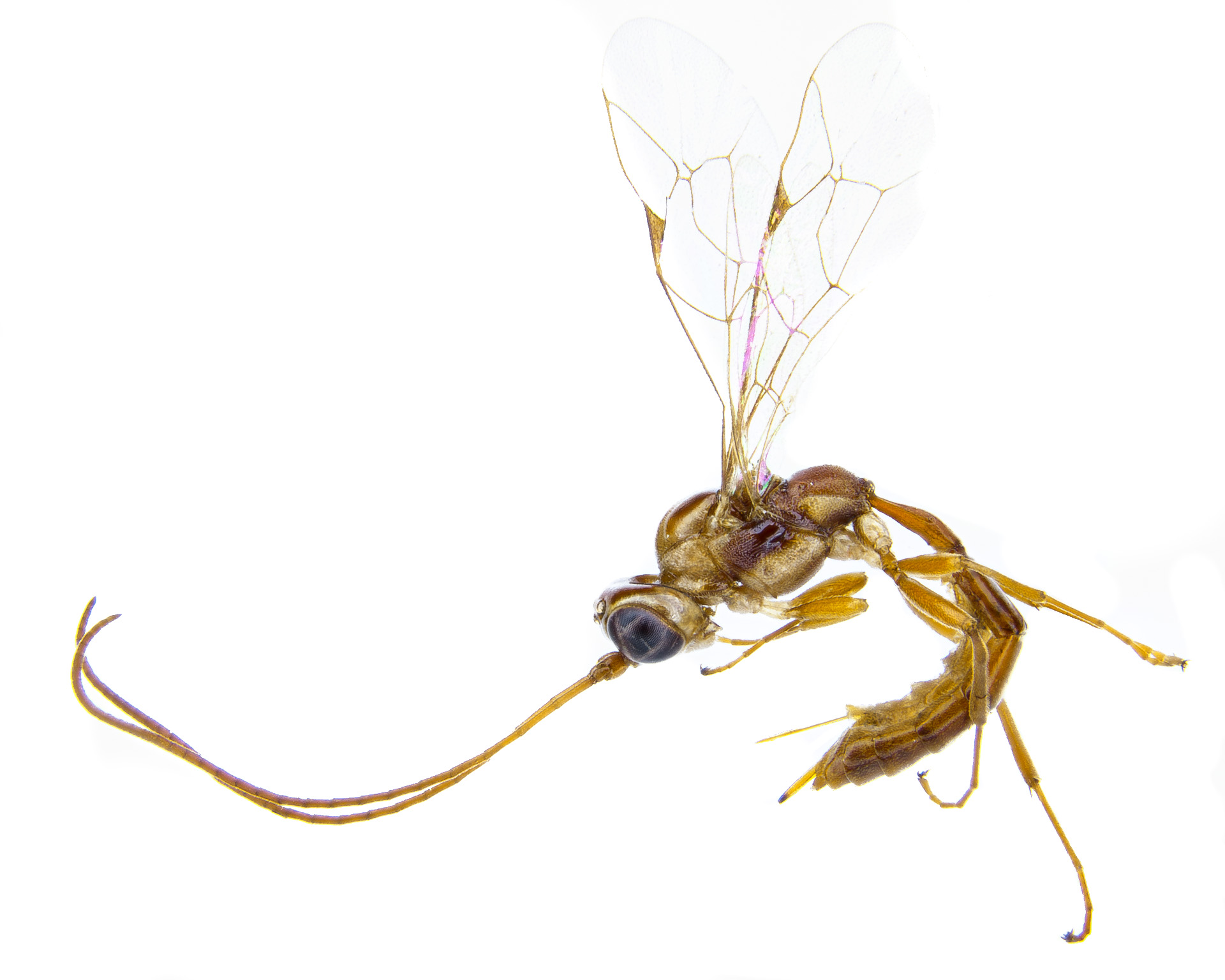
- Lateral view

Scientific classification
- Kingdom: Animalia
- Phylum: Arthropoda
- Clade: Pancrustacea
- Class: Insecta
- Order: Hymenoptera
- Family: Ichneumonidae
- Genus: Lusius
- Species: L. malfoyi

Binomial name
- Lusius malfoyi Saunders & Ward, 2017

= Lusius malfoyi =

Species of wasp

Lusius malfoyi is a parasitoid wasp found in New Zealand. The species is named for Lucius Malfoy, a character in the fictional Harry Potter series of books by J.K. Rowling, although the genus was described in 1903. The species is the first in its genus described in New Zealand; although the holotype specimen was captured in 1981, it was not described until 2017. The species is geographically widespread in New Zealand but rare.

== Description ==
The species is light brown or orange, with brown antennae. Female body length varies from 4.7 mm to 7.8 mm. Its coloration pattern, as well as its geographic range, distinguish it from other species in the genus. Its host is unknown but is likely to be one or several species of moth.

== Range ==
The species is known from both North and South Islands of New Zealand. It is not yet known from offshore islands or other locations, but this is likely due to a lack of sampling. Specimens were collected by malaise trap in spring to late summer (September through to March) in a wide range of habitats, in or near Nothofagus forests and other native forests and brush, from close to sea level up to 850 m. However very few specimens were collected from any one area, so the species appears to be naturally uncommon. It is the only member of the genus Lusius so far described from Australasia, though this may represent a lack of sampling.

== Etymology ==
The species was described by Thomas E. Saunders, then a Masters student at the University of Auckland supervised by Darren Ward from Landcare Research in Auckland, New Zealand. They chose the name in order to "redeem the reputation of wasps" in a manner similar to the redemption of Lucius Malfoy's character in the Harry Potter series.

== See also ==
- List of organisms named after the Harry Potter series
