= Lycosa connexa =

Bloemfontein Lycosa Wolf Spider

Scientific classification
- Kingdom: Animalia
- Phylum: Arthropoda
- Subphylum: Chelicerata
- Class: Arachnida
- Order: Araneae
- Infraorder: Araneomorphae
- Family: Lycosidae
- Genus: Lycosa
- Species: L. connexa

Binomial name
- Lycosa connexa Roewer, 1960

Species of spider

Lycosa connexa is a species of spider in the family Lycosidae. It is endemic to the Free State in South Africa and is commonly known as the Bloemfontein Lycosa wolf spider.

== Distribution ==
Lycosa connexa is known only from the South African type locality Bloemfontein at 1399 m altitude.

== Habitat and ecology ==
Lycosa connexa inhabits the Grassland biome. These are free-living ground dwellers that live in open burrows.

== Conservation ==
Lycosa connexa is listed as Data Deficient for Taxonomic reasons by the South African National Biodiversity Institute. The status of the species remains obscure and additional sampling is needed to collect the male and to determine the species' range.

== Taxonomy ==
Lycosa connexa was described by Roewer in 1960 from Bloemfontein. The species has not been revised and is known only from the female.
