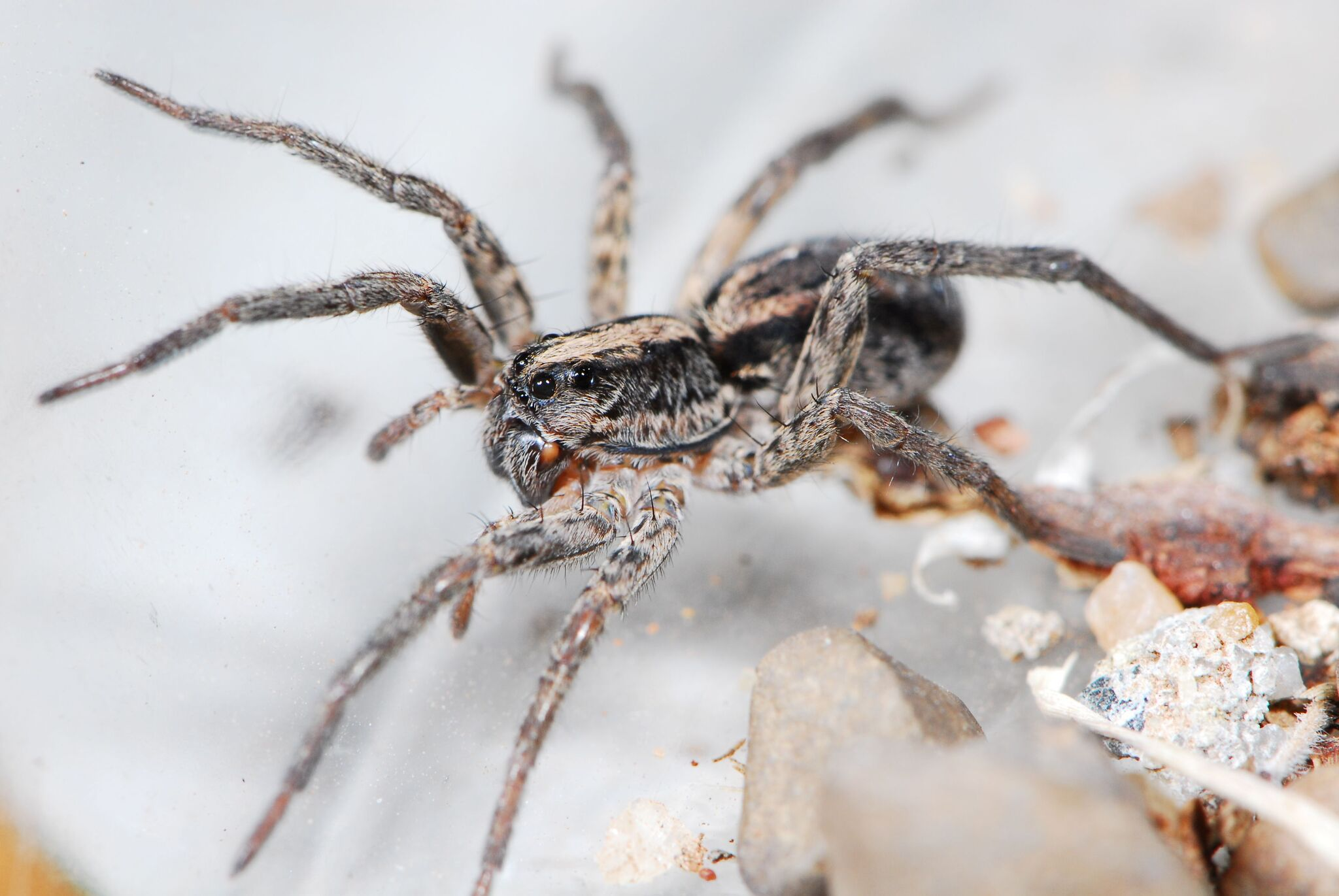
- Female
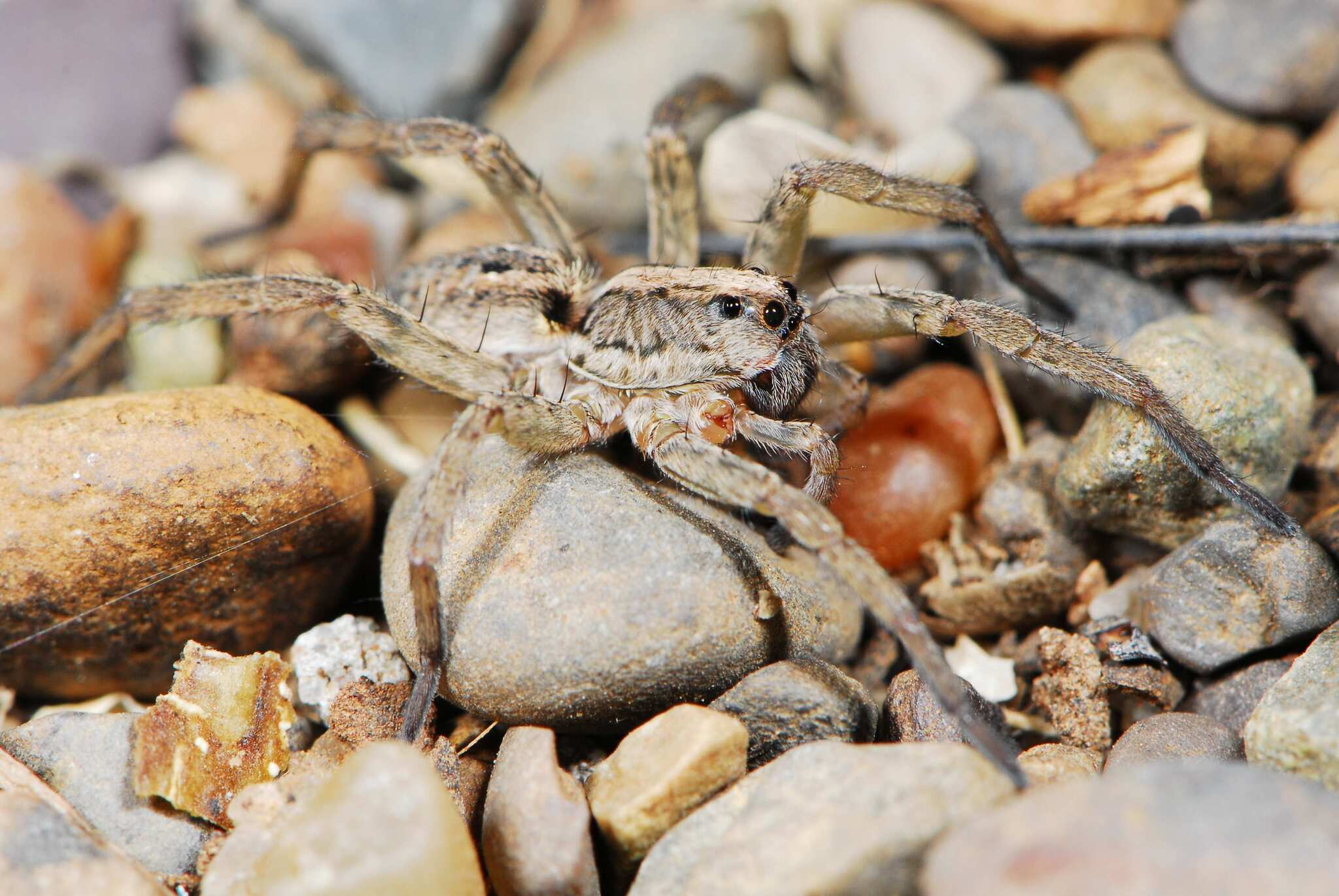
- Female

Scientific classification
- Kingdom: Animalia
- Phylum: Arthropoda
- Subphylum: Chelicerata
- Class: Arachnida
- Order: Araneae
- Infraorder: Araneomorphae
- Family: Lycosidae
- Genus: Lycosa
- Species: L. inviolata

Binomial name
- Lycosa inviolata Roewer, 1960

= Lycosa inviolata =

Kimberley Lycosa Wolf Spider

Species of spider

Lycosa inviolata is a species of spider in the family Lycosidae. It is endemic to the Northern Cape in South Africa and is commonly known as the Kimberley Lycosa wolf spider.

== Distribution ==
Lycosa inviolata is only known from the South African Northern Cape province, including the type locality Kimberley at 1218 m altitude and Rooipoort Nature Reserve.

== Habitat and ecology ==
Lycosa inviolata inhabits the Savanna biome. These are free-living ground dwellers that live in open burrows.

== Conservation ==
Lycosa inviolata is listed as Data Deficient for Taxonomic reasons by the South African National Biodiversity Institute. The status of the species remains obscure and additional sampling is needed to collect the male and to determine the species' range.

== Taxonomy ==
Lycosa inviolata was described by Roewer in 1960 from Kimberley. The species has not been revised and is known only from the female.
