= Lycosa shillongensis =

Scientific classification
- Kingdom: Animalia
- Phylum: Arthropoda
- Subphylum: Chelicerata
- Class: Arachnida
- Order: Araneae
- Infraorder: Araneomorphae
- Family: Lycosidae
- Genus: Lycosa
- Species: L. shillongensis

Binomial name
- Lycosa shillongensis Tikader & Malhotra, 1980

Species of spider

Lycosa shillongensis is a species of spiders of the genus Lycosa native to India In India this spider is reported from Manipur, Meghalaya and West Bengal.
