= Lycosa palliata =

Lycosa Wolf Spider

Scientific classification
- Kingdom: Animalia
- Phylum: Arthropoda
- Subphylum: Chelicerata
- Class: Arachnida
- Order: Araneae
- Infraorder: Araneomorphae
- Family: Lycosidae
- Genus: Lycosa
- Species: L. palliata

Binomial name
- Lycosa palliata Roewer, 1960

Species of spider

Lycosa palliata is a species of spider in the family Lycosidae. It is found in South Africa and is commonly known as the Lycosa wolf spider.

== Distribution ==
Lycosa palliata is found in South Africa. The type locality is given only as "Süd-Afrika" without specific location information.

== Habitat and ecology ==
Lycosa palliata is a free-living ground dweller that lives in open burrows.

== Conservation ==
Lycosa palliata is listed as Data Deficient for Taxonomic reasons by the South African National Biodiversity Institute. The status of the species remains obscure and additional sampling is needed to collect the male and to determine the species' range.

== Taxonomy ==
Lycosa palliata was described by Roewer in 1960. The species is known only from the female.
