= Graphorn =

Scientific classification
- Kingdom: Animalia
- Phylum: Arthropoda
- Class: Insecta
- Order: Hemiptera
- Suborder: Heteroptera
- Family: Pentatomidae
- Tribe: Carpocorini
- Genus: Graphorn; Faúndez, Rider, & Carvajal, 2017

Type species
- Graphorn bicornutus Faúndez, Rider, & Carvajal, 2017

Species
- Graphorn bicallosus (Pirán, 1959)

Genus of true bugs

Graphorn is a genus of shield bug found in Argentina. As of 2022, it is monospecific, just consisting of G. bicallosus (a senior synonym of the type species G. bicornutus). The genus is named after the graphorn, a magical creature from the Harry Potter series. It is found in Argentina, and Paraguay.

== See also ==
- List of organisms named after the Harry Potter series
