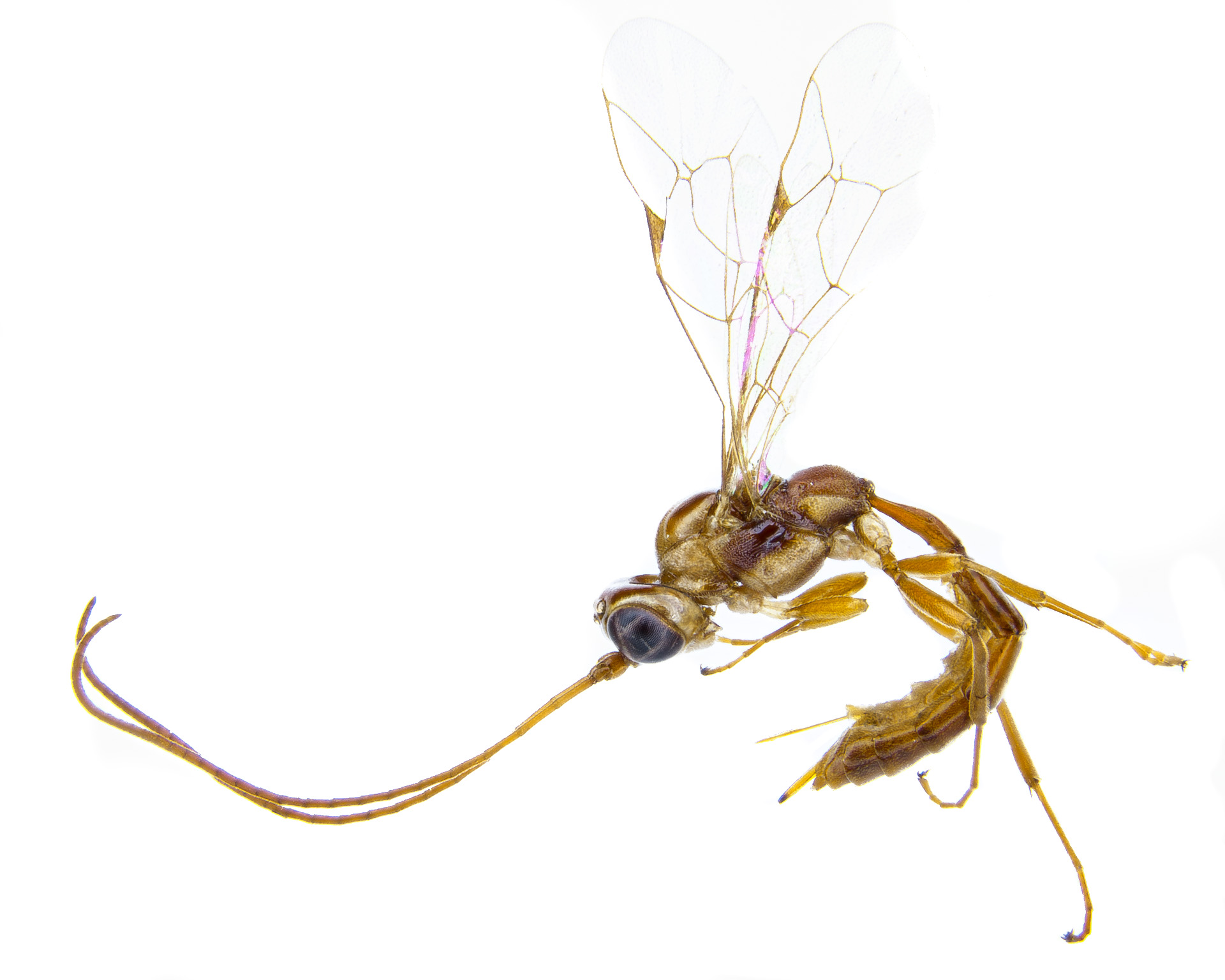
- Lusius malfoyi

Scientific classification
- Domain: Eukaryota
- Kingdom: Animalia
- Phylum: Arthropoda
- Class: Insecta
- Order: Hymenoptera
- Family: Ichneumonidae
- Subfamily: Ichneumoninae
- Tribe: Phaeogenini
- Genus: Lusius; Tosquinet 1903

= Lusius =

Genus of wasps

Lusius is a genus of parasitoid wasps in the tribe Phaeogenini Förster, 1869 or Alomyini Förster, 1869, first described by Pierre Jules Tosquinet in 1903, published after his death. The genus is similar in appearance to species in the genus Heterischnus. Lusius occurs in the Oriental, Afrotropical, Neotropical and Australasian biogeographical regions.

== Species ==
- Lusius aborensis (Morley 1914)
- Lusius anguinus (Cresson 1874)
- Lusius apollos (Morley 1913)
- Lusius flummox Rousse & van Noort 2013
- Lusius ferrugineus Graf 2000
- Lusius gracilis Kusigemati 1986
- Lusius macilentus Tosquinet 1903
- Lusius malfoyi Saunders & Ward 2017
- Lusius tenuissimus (Heinrich 1938)
