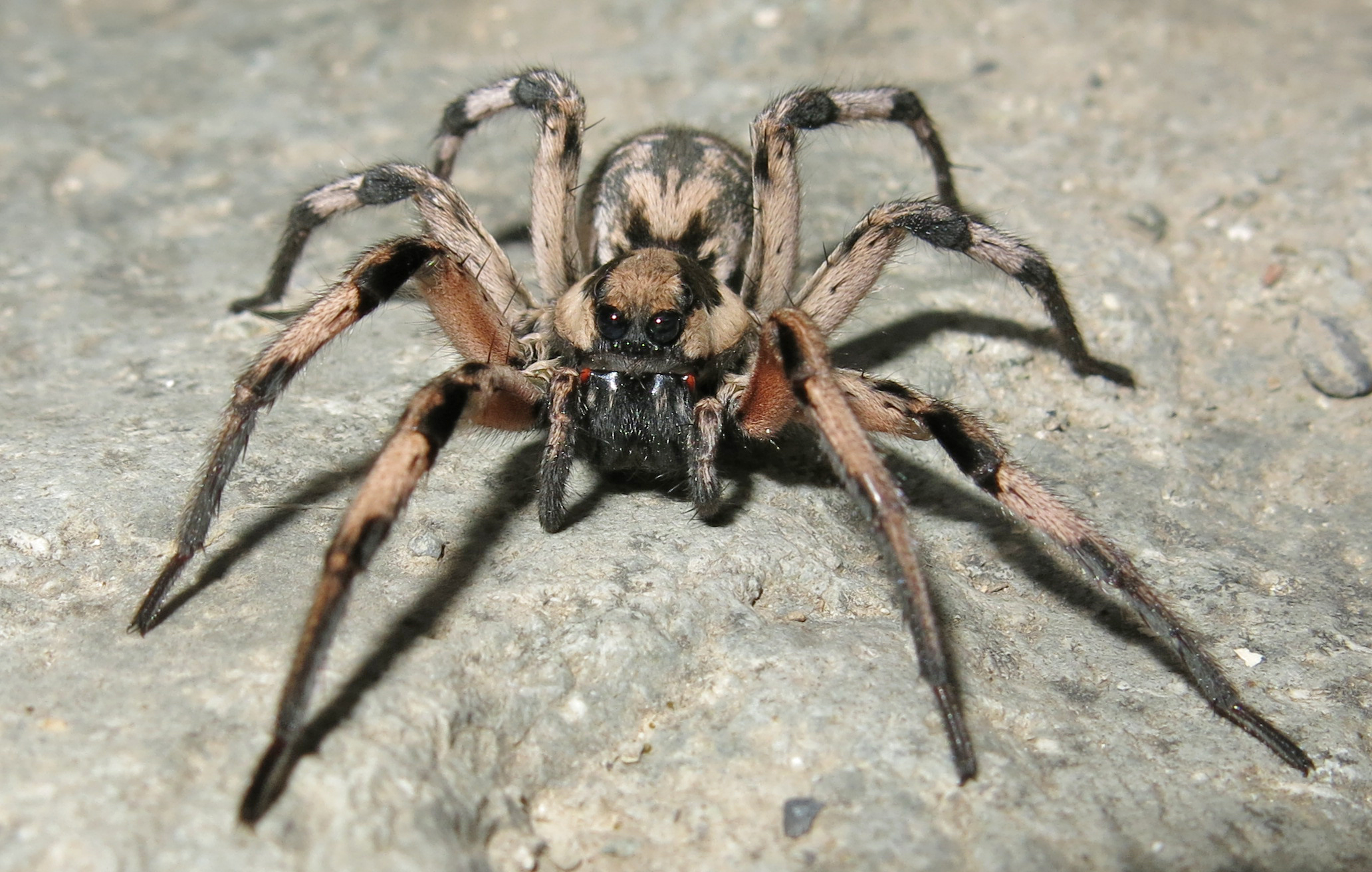
- Female L. aragogi
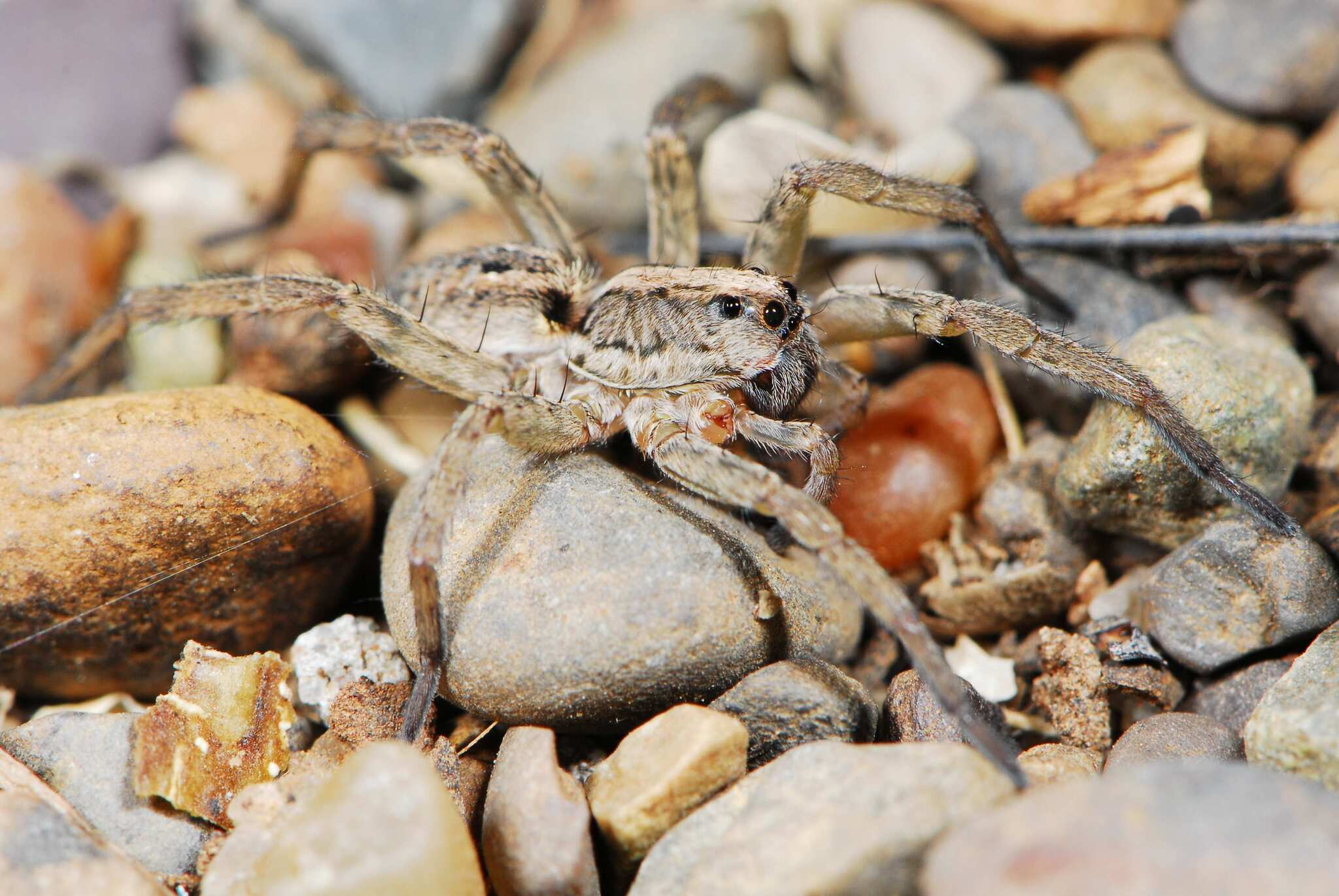
- Female L. inviolata

Scientific classification
- Kingdom: Animalia
- Phylum: Arthropoda
- Subphylum: Chelicerata
- Class: Arachnida
- Order: Araneae
- Infraorder: Araneomorphae
- Family: Lycosidae
- Genus: Lycosa; Latreille, 1804

Species
- > 200, see text.

= Lycosa =

Lycosa Temporal range: Palaeogene–present

Genus of spiders

Lycosa is a genus of wolf spiders distributed throughout most of the world, with more than two hundred described species.

Sometimes called the "true tarantula", though not closely related to the spiders most commonly called tarantulas today, Lycosa spp. can be distinguished from common wolf spiders by their relatively large size. This genus includes the European Lycosa tarantula, which was once associated with tarantism, a dubious affliction whose symptoms included shaking, cold sweats, and a high fever, asserted to be curable only by the traditional tarantella dance. No scientific substantiation of that myth is known; the venom of Lycosa spiders is generally not harmful.

== Life style ==
Species of Lycosa spin no web. The larger forms live in silk-lined burrows and under stones. Females carry the cocoon attached to their spinnerets, and after hatching the young swarm on the mother's back.

== Description ==
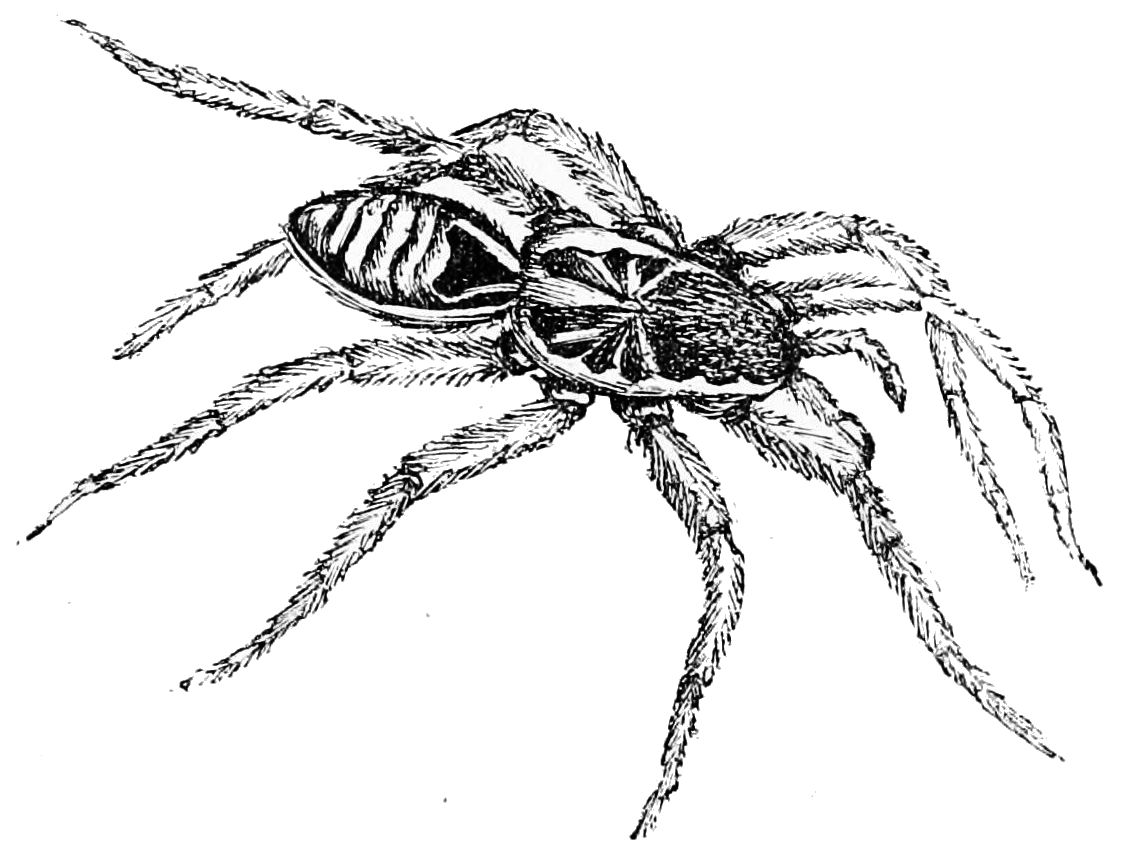
Lycosa tarantula, illustration

The carapace is long with a vertical facial area and slanting sides. The four posterior eyes are large and arranged in a quadrangle that is slightly wider behind than in front. In Lycosa, the eyes of the second row are larger than those of the third row.

The labium is always longer than wide with a prominent basal excavation that occupies usually one-third or more of the labium's length. The clypeus is not vertical.

The legs have tibiae I and II armed with three pairs of ventral spines. Metatarsus IV of leg IV is never longer than the tibia plus patella together.

== Taxonomy ==
The main diagnostic characters considered by Zyuzin and Logunov include the large size and the tongue-shaped septum of the epigyne with an elongated anterior part. The male palp of Lycosa currently includes many medium to large wolf spiders that are not congeneric with the type species L. tarantula, making Lycosa undoubtedly a polyphyletic taxon.

== Species ==
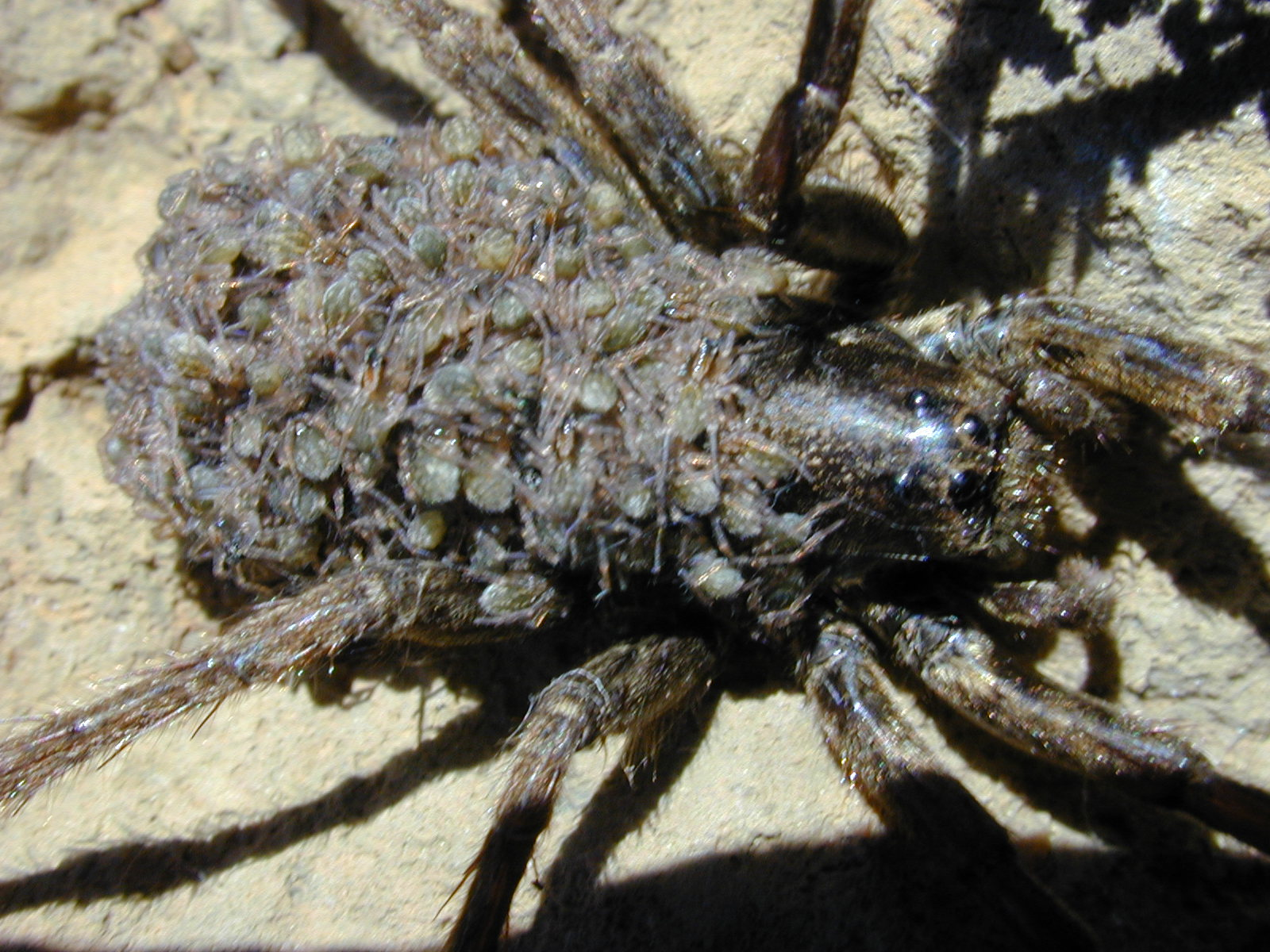
Lycosa hawaiiensis carrying young

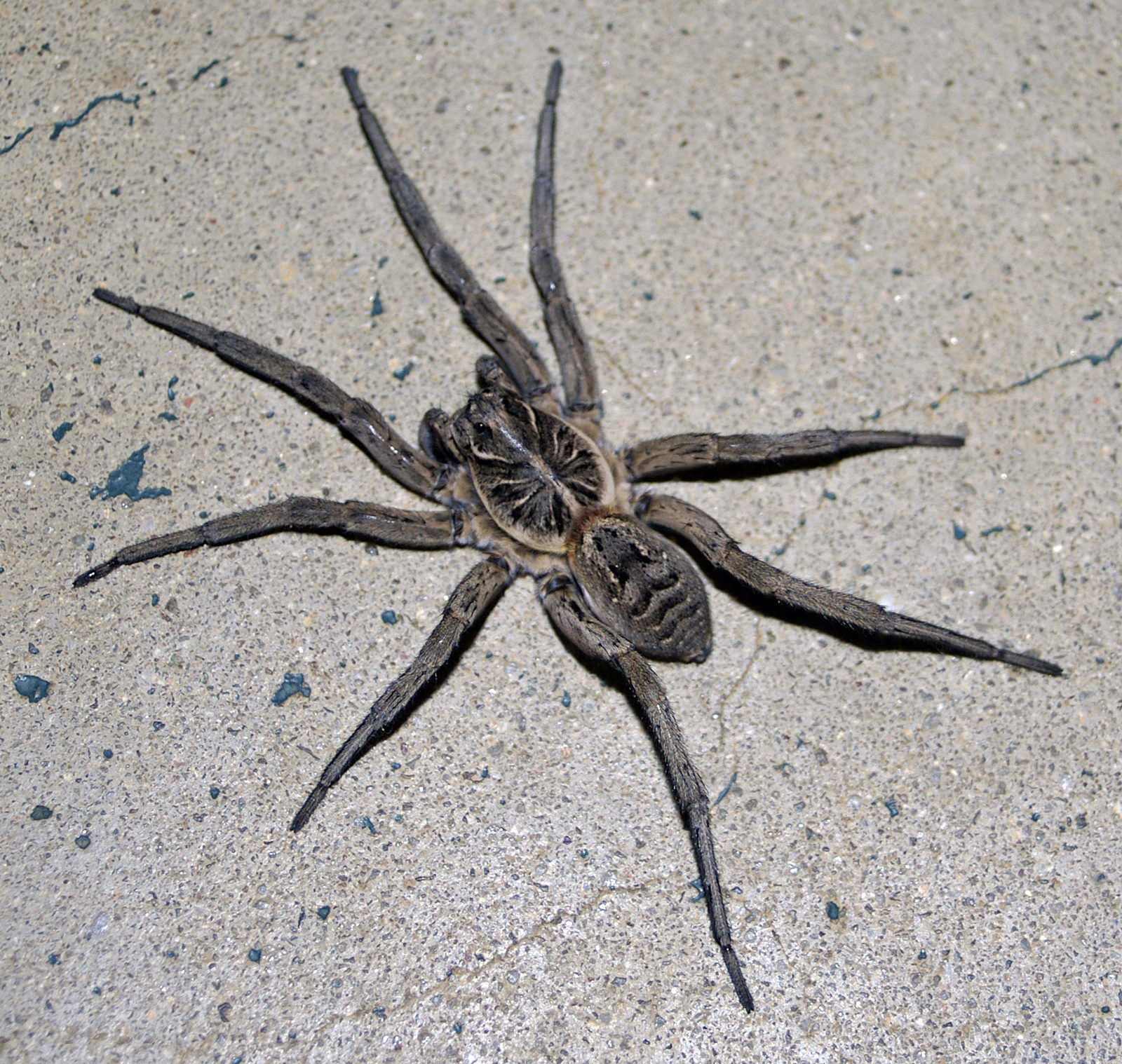
Lycosa leuckarti

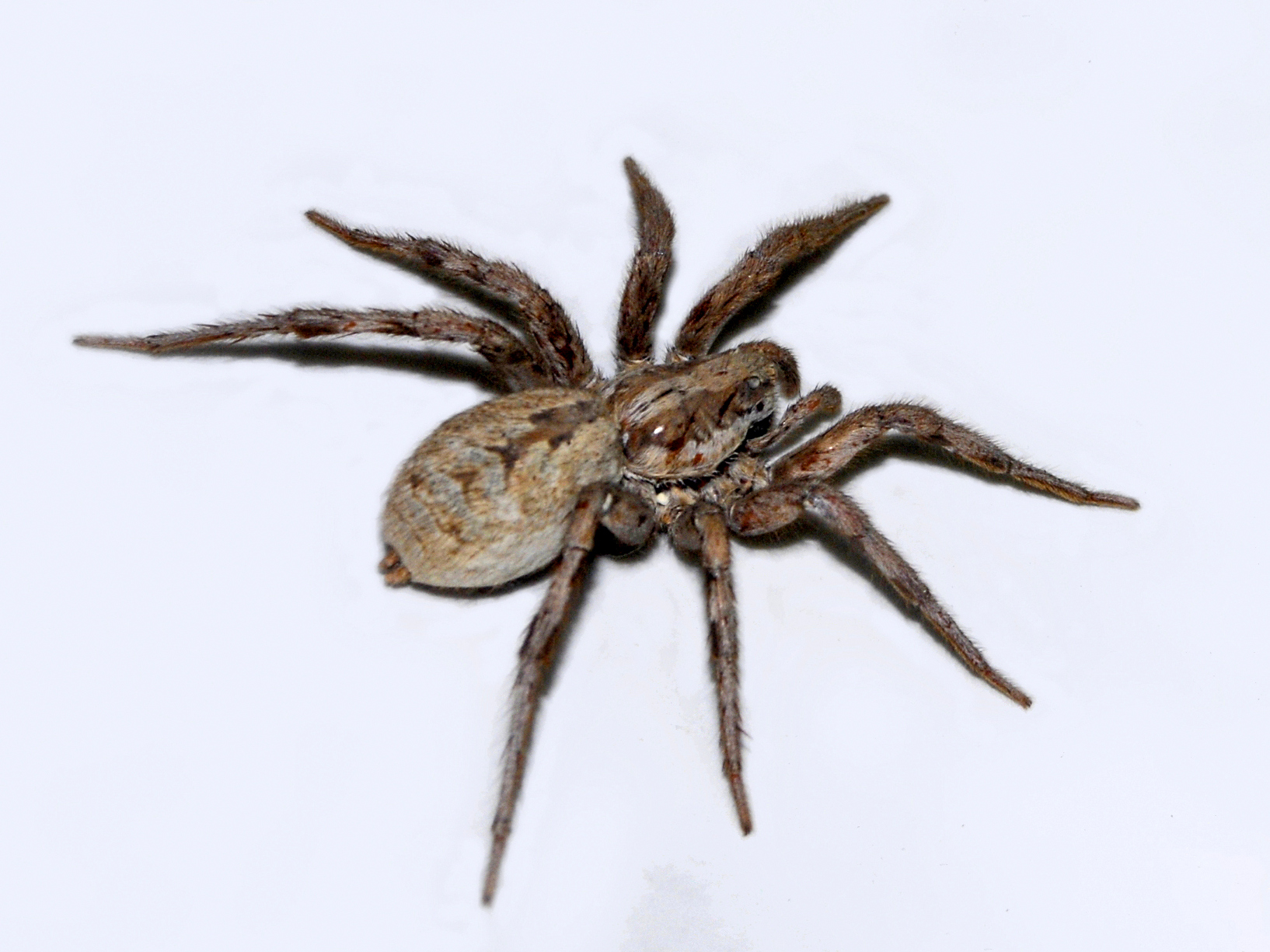
Lycosa narbonensis

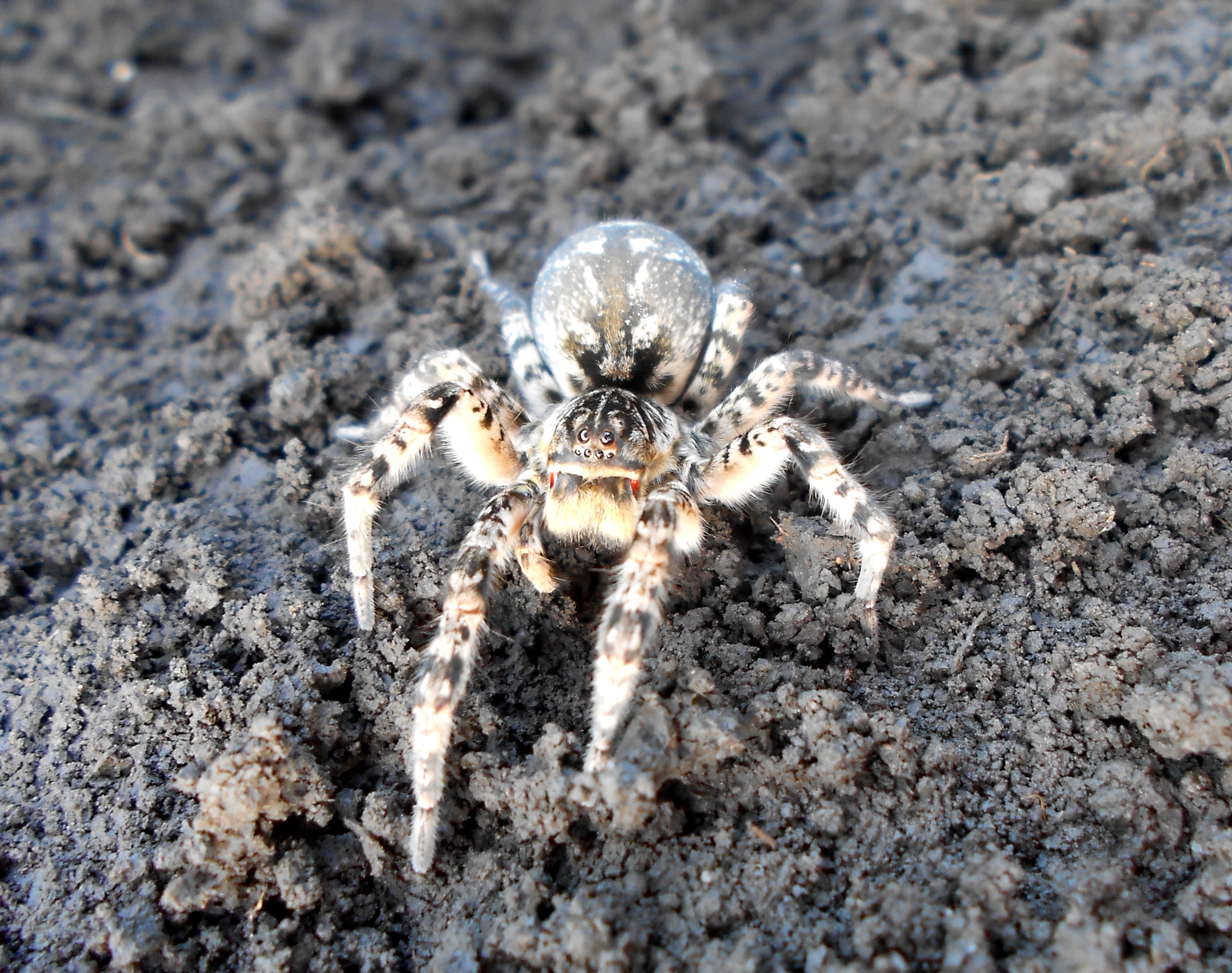
Lycosa singoriensis

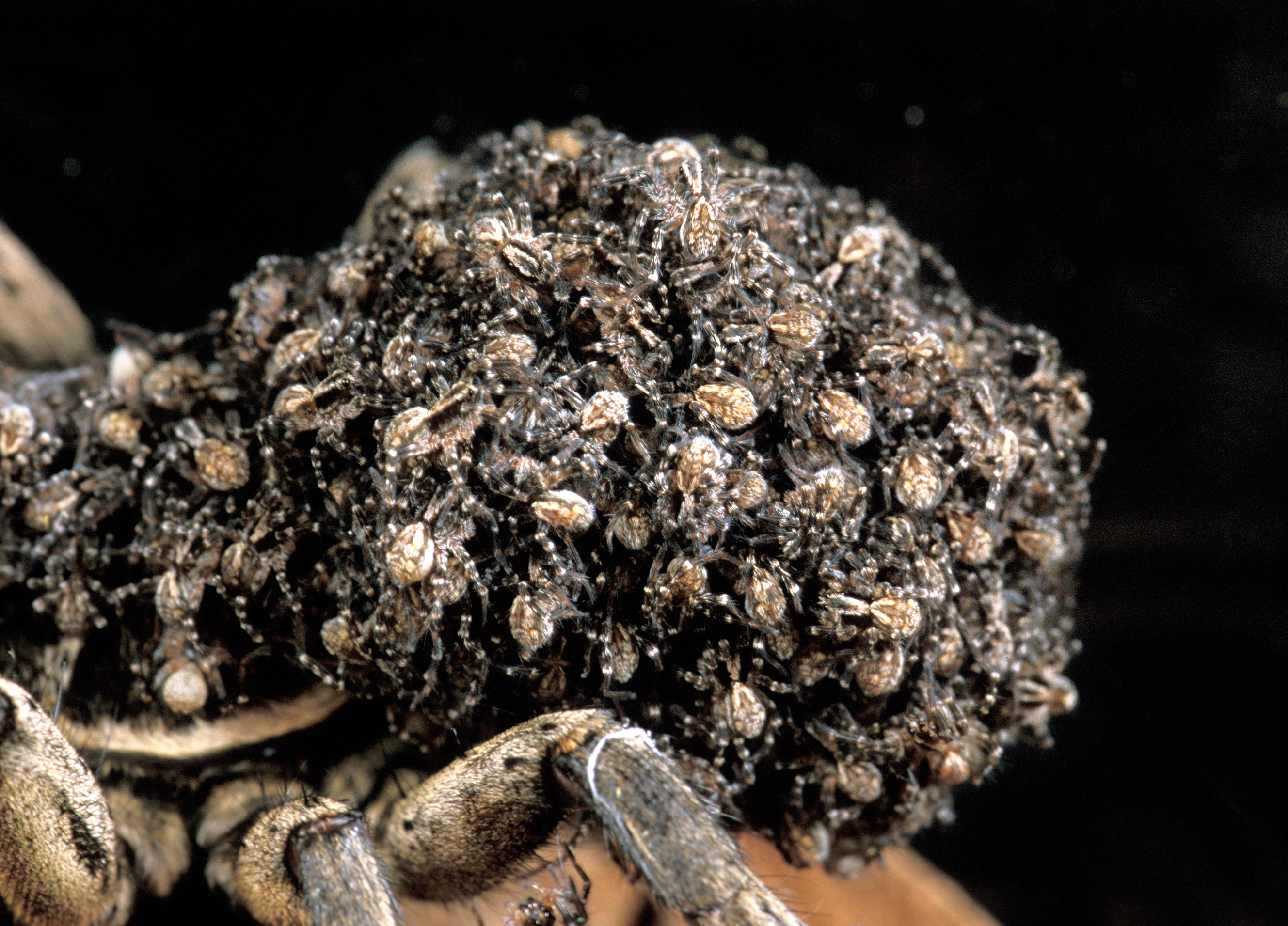
Lycosa godeffroyi carrying young

As of October 2025, this genus includes 213 species and five subspecies.

These species have articles on Wikipedia:

- Lycosa aragogi Nadolny & Zamani, 2017 – Iran
- Lycosa bistriata Gravely, 1924 – Pakistan, India, Bhutan
- Lycosa capensis Simon, 1898 – South Africa
- Lycosa connexa Roewer, 1960 – South Africa
- Lycosa dacica (Pavesi, 1898) – Romania
- Lycosa erythrognatha Lucas, 1836 – Brazil, Uruguay, Paraguay, Argentina
- Lycosa gigantea (Roewer, 1960) – South Africa
- Lycosa howarthi Gertsch, 1973 – Hawaii
- Lycosa indagatrix Walckenaer, 1837 – India, Sri Lanka
- Lycosa inviolata Roewer, 1960 – South Africa
- Lycosa pachana Pocock, 1898 – Malawi, Zimbabwe, South Africa
- Lycosa palliata Roewer, 1960 – South Africa
- Lycosa perspicua Roewer, 1960 – South Africa
- Lycosa rimicola Purcell, 1903 – South Africa
- Lycosa shillongensis Tikader & Malhotra, 1980 – India
- Lycosa singoriensis (Laxmann, 1770) – Central to eastern Europe, Turkey, Caucasus, Russia (Europe to South Siberia), Iran, Kazakhstan, Central Asia, China, Korea
- Lycosa tarantula (Linnaeus, 1758) – France, Italy, Balkans, Turkey, Middle East (type species)
- Lycosa yerburyi Pocock, 1901 – Sri Lanka

Complete list of species as of October 2025
- Lycosa abidae Sherwood, 2025 – Pakistan
- Lycosa abnormis Guy, 1966 – Morocco
- Lycosa accurata (Becker, 1886) – Mexico
- Lycosa adusta Banks, 1898 – Mexico
- Lycosa affinis Lucas, 1846 – Algeria
- Lycosa apacha Chamberlin, 1925 – United States
- Lycosa approximata (O. Pickard-Cambridge, 1885) – China (Yarkand)
- Lycosa aragogi Nadolny & Zamani, 2017 – Iran
- Lycosa arambagensis B. Biswas & K. Biswas, 1992 – India
- Lycosa ariadnae McKay, 1979 – Australia (Western Australia)
- Lycosa articulata Costa, 1875 – Israel
- Lycosa airy Hogg, 1896 – Central Australia
- Lycosa auroguttata (Keyserling, 1891) – Brazil
- Lycosa australicola (Strand, 1913) – Australia (Western Australia, Northern Territory)
- Lycosa australis Simon, 1884 – Chile
- Lycosa balaramai Patel & Reddy, 1993 – India
- Lycosa barnesi Gravely, 1924 – India
- Lycosa baulnyi Simon, 1876 – North Africa
- Lycosa bedeli Simon, 1876 – North Africa
- Lycosa beihaiensis Yin, Bao & Zhang, 1995 – China
- Lycosa bezzii Mello-Leitão, 1944 – Argentina
- Lycosa biolleyi Banks, 1909 – Costa Rica
- Lycosa bistriata Gravely, 1924 – Pakistan, India, Bhutan
- Lycosa boninensis Tanaka, 1989 – Taiwan, Japan, Korea
- Lycosa bonneti Guy & Carricaburu, 1967 – Algeria
- Lycosa brunnea F. O. Pickard-Cambridge, 1902 – Costa Rica, Guatemala, Mexico
- Lycosa caenosa Rainbow, 1899 – New Caledonia, Vanuatu
- Lycosa canescens Schenkel, 1963 – China
- Lycosa capensis Simon, 1898 – South Africa
- Lycosa carbonelli Costa & Capocasale, 1984 – Uruguay
- Lycosa carmichaeli Gravely, 1924 – India, Bhutan
- Lycosa cerrofloresiana Petrunkevitch, 1925 – El Salvador to Panama
- Lycosa chaperi Simon, 1885 – Pakistan, India
- Lycosa choudhuryi Tikader & Malhotra, 1980 – India, China
- Lycosa cingara (C. L. Koch, 1847) – Egypt
- Lycosa coelestis L. Koch, 1878 – China, Korea, Japan
- Lycosa connexa Roewer, 1960 – South Africa
- Lycosa contestata Montgomery, 1903 – United States
- Lycosa corallina McKay, 1974 – Australia (Western Australia)
- Lycosa coreana Paik, 1994 – Korea
- Lycosa cowlei Hogg, 1896 – Central Australia
- Lycosa cretacea Simon, 1898 – North Africa
- Lycosa dacica (Pavesi, 1898) – Romania
- Lycosa danjiangensis Yin, Zhao & Bao, 1997 – China
- Lycosa dilatata F. O. Pickard-Cambridge, 1902 – Mexico to El Salvador
- Lycosa dimota Simon, 1909 – Australia (Western Australia)
- Lycosa discolor Walckenaer, 1837 – United States
- Lycosa airy Zamani & Nadolny, 2022 – Iran
- Lycosa emuncta Banks, 1898 – Mexico
- Lycosa erjianensis Yin & Zhao, 1996 – China
- Lycosa erythrognatha Lucas, 1836 – Brazil, Uruguay, Paraguay, Argentina
- Lycosa eutypa Chamberlin, 1925 – Panama
- Lycosa falconensis Schenkel, 1953 – Venezuela
- Lycosa fasciiventris Dufour, 1835 – Portugal, Spain, Morocco
- Lycosa fernandezi (F. O. Pickard-Cambridge, 1899) – Chile (Juan Fernandez Is.)
- Lycosa ferriculosa Chamberlin, 1919 – United States
- Lycosa formosana Saito, 1936 – Taiwan
- Lycosa fuscana Pocock, 1901 – India
- Lycosa futilis Banks, 1898 – Mexico
- Lycosa geotubalis Tikader & Malhotra, 1980 – India
- Lycosa gesserit Armiach Steinpress, Cohen, Pétillon, Chipman & Gavish-Regev, 2022 – Israel
- Lycosa gibsoni McKay, 1979 – Australia (Western Australia)
- Lycosa gigantea (Roewer, 1960) – South Africa
- Lycosa gobiensis Schenkel, 1936 – Mongolia, China
- Lycosa goliathus Pocock, 1901 – India
- Lycosa grahami Fox, 1935 – China
- Lycosa gravelyi Biswas & Raychaudhuri, 2014 – Bangladesh
- Lycosa guayaquiliana Mello-Leitão, 1939 – Ecuador
- Lycosa hickmani (Roewer, 1955) – New Guinea, Australia (Northern Australia)
- Lycosa hildegardae Casanueva, 1980 – Chile
- Lycosa hispanica (Walckenaer, 1837) – Spain
  - L. h. dufouri (Simon, 1876) – Portugal, Spain
- Lycosa horrida (Keyserling, 1877) – Colombia
- Lycosa howarthi Gertsch, 1973 – Hawaii
- Lycosa hyraculus Armiach Steinpress, Cohen, Pétillon, Chipman & Gavish-Regev, 2022 – Egypt, Israel
- Lycosa illicita Gertsch, 1934 – Mexico
- Lycosa immanis L. Koch, 1879 – Russia (West Siberia, Far East)
- Lycosa impavida Walckenaer, 1837 – United States
- Lycosa implacida Nicolet, 1849 – Chile
- Lycosa indagatrix Walckenaer, 1837 – India, Sri Lanka
- Lycosa indomita Nicolet, 1849 – Chile
- Lycosa infesta Walckenaer, 1837 – United States
- Lycosa injusta Banks, 1898 – Mexico
- Lycosa innocua Doleschall, 1859 – Indonesia (Ambon)
- Lycosa inornata Blackwall, 1862 – Brazil
- Lycosa insulana (Bryant, 1923) – Barbados
- Lycosa insularis Lucas, 1857 – Cuba
- Lycosa intermedialis Roewer, 1955 – Libya
- Lycosa interstitialis (Strand, 1906) – Algeria
- Lycosa inviolata Roewer, 1960 – South Africa
- Lycosa iranii Pocock, 1901 – India
- Lycosa ishikariana (Saito, 1934) – Russia (Sakhalin, Kurile Is.), Japan
- Lycosa isolata Bryant, 1940 – Cuba
- Lycosa jagadalpurensis Gajbe, 2004 – India
- Lycosa japhlongensis Biswas & Raychaudhuri, 2014 – Bangladesh
- Lycosa kempi Gravely, 1924 – Pakistan, India, Nepal, Bhutan, China
- Lycosa koyuga McKay, 1979 – Australia (Western Australia)
- Lycosa kuryk Esyunin & Efimik, 2025 – Kazakhstan
- Lycosa labialis Mao & Song, 1985 – China, Korea
- Lycosa labialisoides Peng, Yin, Zhang & Kim, 1997 – China
- Lycosa laeta L. Koch, 1877 – Australia (Northern Territory, Queensland, New South Wales)
- Lycosa lambai Tikader & Malhotra, 1980 – India
- Lycosa lativulva F. O. Pickard-Cambridge, 1902 – Guatemala
- Lycosa lebakensis Doleschall, 1859 – Indonesia (Java)
- Lycosa leucogastra Mello-Leitão, 1944 – Argentina
- Lycosa leucophaeoides (Roewer, 1951) – Australia (Queensland)
- Lycosa leucophthalma Mello-Leitão, 1940 – Argentina
- Lycosa leucotaeniata (Mello-Leitão, 1947) – Brazil
- Lycosa liliputana Nicolet, 1849 – Chile
- Lycosa longivulva F. O. Pickard-Cambridge, 1902 – Guatemala
- Lycosa mackenziei Gravely, 1924 – Pakistan, India, Bangladesh
- Lycosa macrophthalma Nadolny & Zamani, 2020 – Iran
- Lycosa madagascariensis Vinson, 1863 – Madagascar
- Lycosa madani Pocock, 1901 – Pakistan, India
- Lycosa magallanica Karsch, 1880 – Chile
- Lycosa magnifica Hu, 2001 – China
- Lycosa mahabaleshwarensis Tikader & Malhotra, 1980 – India
- Lycosa masteri Pocock, 1901 – India
- Lycosa matusitai Nakatsudi, 1943 – Japan to Micronesia
- Lycosa maya Chamberlin, 1925 – Mexico
- Lycosa mexicana Banks, 1898 – Mexico
- Lycosa minae (Dönitz & Strand, 1906) – Japan
- Lycosa mordax Walckenaer, 1837 – United States
- Lycosa moulmeinensis Gravely, 1924 – Myanmar
- Lycosa mukana Roewer, 1960 – DR Congo
- Lycosa munieri Simon, 1876 – North Africa, Spain (Balearic Is.), Italy (Sardinia)
- Lycosa muntea (Roewer, 1960) – Congo
- Lycosa niceforoi Mello-Leitão, 1941 – Colombia
- Lycosa nigricans Butt, Anwar & Tahir, 2006 – Pakistan
- Lycosa nigromarmorata Mello-Leitão, 1941 – Colombia
- Lycosa nigropunctata Rainbow, 1915 – Australia (South Australia)
- Lycosa nigrotaeniata Mello-Leitão, 1941 – Colombia
- Lycosa nigrotibialis Simon, 1884 – India, Bhutan, Myanmar
- Lycosa nordenskjoldi Tullgren, 1905 – Brazil, Bolivia
- Lycosa oculata Simon, 1876 – Western Mediterranean
- Lycosa pachana Pocock, 1898 – Malawi, Zimbabwe, South Africa
- Lycosa palliata Roewer, 1960 – South Africa
- Lycosa pampeana Holmberg, 1876 – Paraguay, Argentina
- Lycosa paranensis Holmberg, 1876 – Brazil, Argentina
- Lycosa parvipudens Karsch, 1881 – Kiribati (Gilbert Is.)
- Lycosa patagonica Simon, 1886 – Chile
- Lycosa pavlovi Schenkel, 1953 – China
- Lycosa perkinsi Simon, 1904 – Hawaii
- Lycosa perspicua Roewer, 1960 – South Africa
- Lycosa philadelphiana Walckenaer, 1837 – United States
- Lycosa phipsoni Pocock, 1899 – India to China, Taiwan
  - L. p. leucophora (Thorell, 1887) – Myanmar
- Lycosa pia (Bösenberg & Strand, 1906) – Japan
- Lycosa picta Biswas & Raychaudhuri, 2014 – Bangladesh
- Lycosa pictipes (Keyserling, 1891) – Brazil, Argentina
- Lycosa pictula Pocock, 1901 – India
- Lycosa pintoi Mello-Leitão, 1931 – Brazil
- Lycosa piochardi Simon, 1876 – Turkey, Egypt, Israel, Palestine, Jordan, Lebanon, Syria, Iraq, Iran
- Lycosa poliostoma (C. L. Koch, 1847) – Brazil, Paraguay, Uruguay, Argentina
- Lycosa poonaensis Tikader & Malhotra, 1980 – India
- Lycosa porteri Simon, 1904 – Chile
- Lycosa praegrandis C. L. Koch, 1836 – Albania, North Macedonia, Bulgaria, Greece, Turkey, Ukraine, Russia (Europe), Caucasus, Kazakhstan, Iran, Central Asia
  - L. p. discoloriventer Caporiacco, 1949 – Albania
- Lycosa praestans Roewer, 1960 – Botswana
- Lycosa proletarioides Mello-Leitão, 1941 – Argentina
- Lycosa prolifica Pocock, 1901 – India
- Lycosa pulchella (Thorell, 1881) – New Guinea, Papua New Guinea (Bismarck Arch.)
- Lycosa punctiventralis (Roewer, 1951) – Mexico
- Lycosa quadrimaculata Lucas, 1858 – Gabon
- Lycosa rimicola Purcell, 1903 – South Africa
- Lycosa rufisterna Schenkel, 1953 – China
- Lycosa russea Schenkel, 1953 – China
- Lycosa sabulosa (O. Pickard-Cambridge, 1885) – China (Yarkand), and Tjikistan, Afghanistan
- Lycosa salifodina McKay, 1976 – Australia (Western Australia)
- Lycosa salvadorensis Kraus, 1955 – El Salvador
- Lycosa separata (Roewer, 1960) – Mozambique
- Lycosa septembris (Strand, 1906) – Ethiopia
- Lycosa sericovittata Mello-Leitão, 1939 – Brazil
- Lycosa serranoa Tullgren, 1901 – Chile
- Lycosa shahapuraensis Gajbe, 2004 – India
- Lycosa shaktae Bhandari & Gajbe, 2001 – India
- Lycosa shansia (Hogg, 1912) – China, Mongolia
- Lycosa shillongensis Tikader & Malhotra, 1980 – India
- Lycosa signata Lenz, 1886 – Madagascar
- Lycosa signiventris Banks, 1909 – El Salvador, Costa Rica
- Lycosa sigridae (Strand, 1917) – Mexico
- Lycosa similis Banks, 1892 – United States
- Lycosa singoriensis (Laxmann, 1770) – Central to eastern Europe, Turkey, Caucasus, Russia (Europe to South Siberia), Iran, Kazakhstan, Central Asia, China, Korea
- Lycosa soboutii Shafaie, Nadolny & Mirshamsi, 2022 – Georgia, Iran
- Lycosa sochoi Mello-Leitão, 1947 – Brazil
- Lycosa storeniformis Simon, 1909 – Guinea-Bissau
- Lycosa subfusca F. O. Pickard-Cambridge, 1902 – Mexico, Costa Rica
- Lycosa suboculata Guy, 1966 – North Africa
- Lycosa suzukii Kishida, 1960 – Russia (Far East), China, Korea, Japan
- Lycosa sylvatica (Roewer, 1951) – Algeria
- Lycosa tarantula (Linnaeus, 1758) – France, Italy, Balkans, Turkey, Middle East (type species)
  - L. t. carsica Caporiacco, 1949 – Italy
  - L. t. cisalpina Simon, 1937 – France
- Lycosa tarantuloides Perty, 1833 – Brazil
- Lycosa tasmanicola Roewer, 1960 – Australia (Tasmania)
- Lycosa teranganicola (Strand, 1911) – Indonesia (Aru Is.)
- Lycosa terrestris Butt, Anwar & Tahir, 2006 – Pakistan
- Lycosa tetrophthalma Mello-Leitão, 1939 – Paraguay
- Lycosa thoracica Patel & Reddy, 1993 – India
- Lycosa tista Tikader, 1970 – India, Bangladesh
- Lycosa transversa F. O. Pickard-Cambridge, 1902 – Guatemala
- Lycosa trichopus (Roewer, 1960) – Afghanistan
- Lycosa tula (Strand, 1913) – Australia (Western Australia)
- Lycosa u-album Mello-Leitão, 1938 – Argentina
- Lycosa uzbekistanica Logunov, 2023 – Uzbekistan, Kazakhstan?
- Lycosa vachoni Guy, 1966 – Algeria
- Lycosa vellutina Mello-Leitão, 1941 – Colombia
- Lycosa ventralis F. O. Pickard-Cambridge, 1902 – Mexico
- Lycosa vittata Yin, Bao & Zhang, 1995 – China
- Lycosa wadaiensis Roewer, 1960 – Chad
- Lycosa wangi Yin, Peng & Wang, 1996 – China
- Lycosa woonda McKay, 1979 – Australia (Western Australia)
- Lycosa wroughtoni Pocock, 1899 – Pakistan, India
- Lycosa wulsini Fox, 1935 – China
- Lycosa yalkara McKay, 1979 – Australia (Western Australia)
- Lycosa yerburyi Pocock, 1901 – Sri Lanka
- Lycosa yizhangensis Yin, Peng & Wang, 1996 – China
- Lycosa yunnanensis Yin, Peng & Wang, 1996 – China
