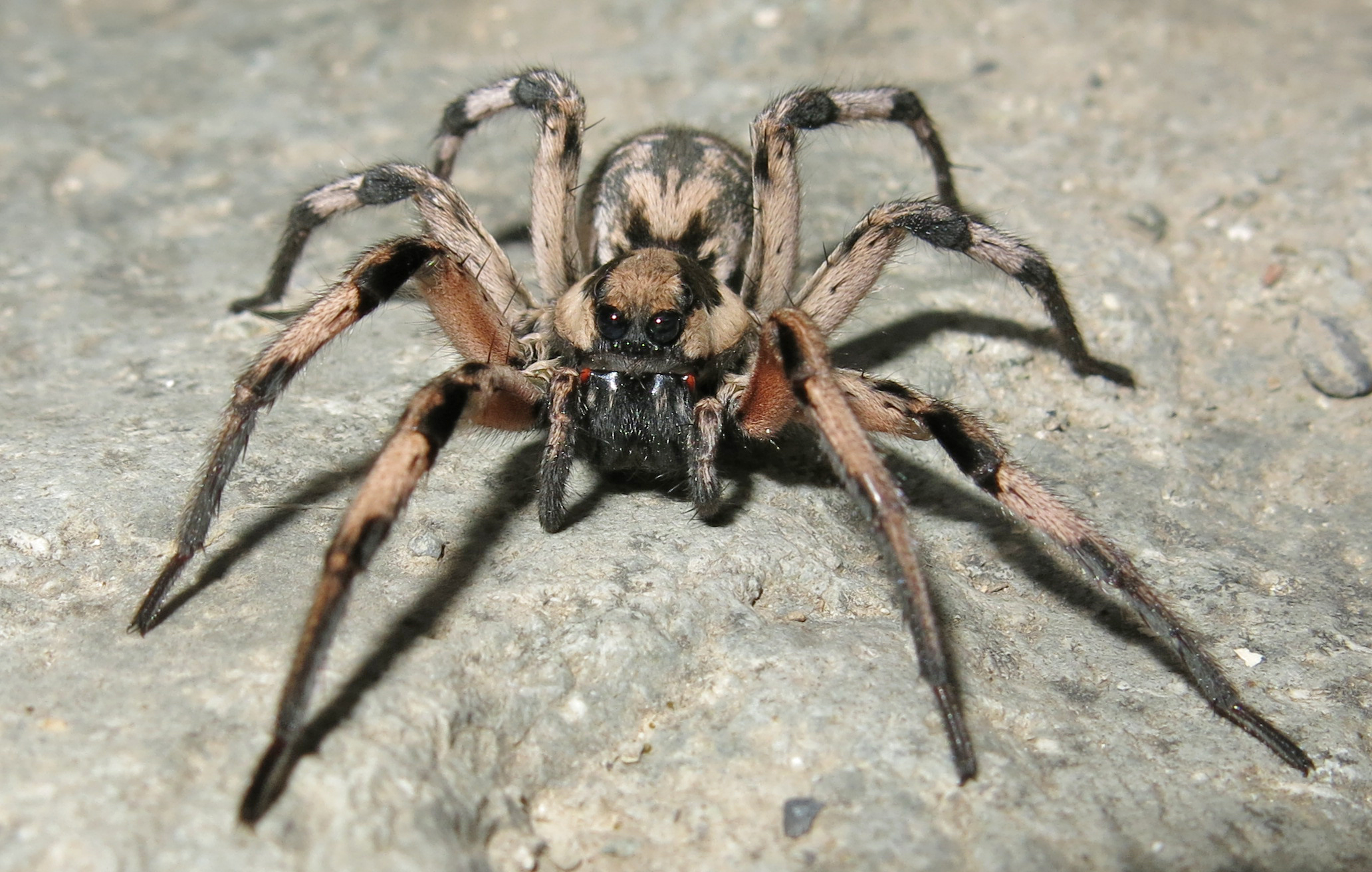
- Holotype female of Lycosa aragogi

Scientific classification
- Kingdom: Animalia
- Phylum: Arthropoda
- Subphylum: Chelicerata
- Class: Arachnida
- Order: Araneae
- Infraorder: Araneomorphae
- Family: Lycosidae
- Genus: Lycosa
- Species: L. aragogi

Binomial name
- Lycosa aragogi Nadolny & Zamani, 2017

= Lycosa aragogi =

Species of spider

Lycosa aragogi is a species of the araneomorph spider family Lycosidae endemic to Kerman province, Iran. The female holotype measured 26mm, (excluding the legs), with two black and three white stripes of setae on its cephalothorax, black setae on its chelicerae, and scattered dots and patterns of black and white setae on its abdomen.

== Discovery and naming ==
This species was named after Aragog, the fictional spider from the Harry Potter series by J.K. Rowling, as it resembled the animatronic puppet version of this character created for the movie Harry Potter and the Chamber of Secrets. Another reason for this eponymy was the celebration of the 20th anniversary of the whole Harry Potter series in 2017. The single specimen was collected by Iranian entomologist Alireza Zamani in a mountainous region of southeastern Iran's Kerman province on 26 April 2016, just over 19 years after Aragog died (20 April 1997, according to the Harry Potter series), and later described by arachnologists Anton Nadolny and Alireza Zamani in a paper published in the journal Zootaxa.
