= Caboverdensis =

Caboverdensis and caboverdense are Latin adjectives meaning "pertaining to, or originating in Cape Verde". It may refer to any of the following species:

- Allocosa caboverdensis, a wolf spider species
- Hottentota caboverdensis, a scorpion species
- Microlipophrys caboverdensis, a combtooth blenny species
- Pollicipes caboverdensis, a goose barnacle species
- Tritia caboverdensis, a mud snail (dog whelk) species
- Tyrannodoris caboverdensis, a sea slug species

== Synonyms ==
- Hinia caboverdensis, synonym of Tritia caboverdensis, a mud snail (dog whelk) species
- Nassarius caboverdensis, synonym of Tritia caboverdensis
