= Allocosa dufouri =

Scientific classification
- Kingdom: Animalia
- Phylum: Arthropoda
- Subphylum: Chelicerata
- Class: Arachnida
- Order: Araneae
- Infraorder: Araneomorphae
- Family: Lycosidae
- Genus: Allocosa
- Species: A. dufouri

Binomial name
- Allocosa dufouri (Simon, 1876)

Species of spider

Allocosa dufouri is a wolf spider (family Lycosidae) found in Portugal and Spain.
