= Allocosa schoenlandi =

Grahamstown Allocosa Wolf Spider

Scientific classification
- Kingdom: Animalia
- Phylum: Arthropoda
- Subphylum: Chelicerata
- Class: Arachnida
- Order: Araneae
- Infraorder: Araneomorphae
- Family: Lycosidae
- Genus: Allocosa
- Species: A. schoenlandi

Binomial name
- Allocosa schoenlandi (Pocock, 1900)

Synonyms
- Lycosa schönlandi Pocock, 1900; Allocosa schönlandi Roewer, 1955

Species of spider

Allocosa schoenlandi is a species of spider in the family Lycosidae. It is endemic to South Africa and is commonly known as the Grahamstown Allocosa wolf spider.

== Distribution ==
Allocosa schoenlandi is known only from Grahamstown (now Makhanda) in the Eastern Cape.

== Habitat and ecology ==
The species is a free running ground dweller sampled from the Thicket Biome at 552 m.

== Conservation ==
Allocosa schoenlandi is listed as Data Deficient for Taxonomic reasons by the South African National Biodiversity Institute. The status of the species remains obscure and additional sampling is needed to collect the male and to determine the species' range.

== Taxonomy ==
The species was described by Pocock in 1900 and is known only from the type locality Grahamstown. The species was revised by Roewer in 1959 and is known only from the female.
