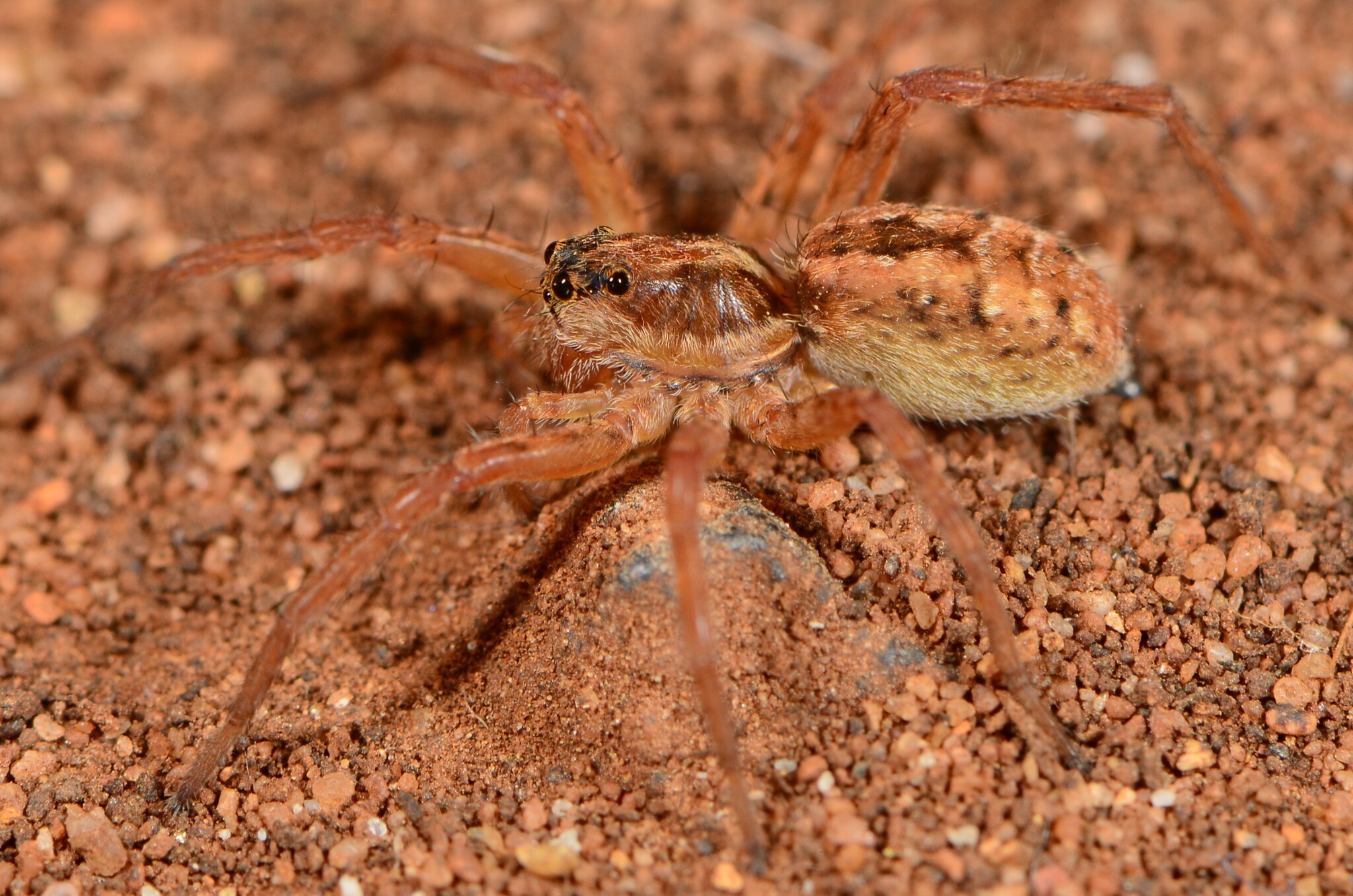
- female

Scientific classification
- Kingdom: Animalia
- Phylum: Arthropoda
- Subphylum: Chelicerata
- Class: Arachnida
- Order: Araneae
- Infraorder: Araneomorphae
- Family: Lycosidae
- Genus: Allocosa
- Species: A. exserta

Binomial name
- Allocosa exserta Roewer, 1959

= Allocosa exserta =

Gauteng Allocosa Wolf Spider

Species of spider

Allocosa exserta is a species of spider in the family Lycosidae. It is commonly known as the Gauteng Allocosa wolf spider.

== Distribution ==
Allocosa exserta is known from Botswana, Namibia, and South Africa.

In South Africa, the species is known from various localities in Gauteng and Limpopo.

== Habitat and ecology ==
The species is a free running ground dweller sampled from the Grassland and Savanna biomes at altitudes ranging from 866 to 1647 m.

== Conservation ==
Allocosa exserta is listed as Least Concern by the South African National Biodiversity Institute due to its wide geographical range. It is known from six protected areas.

== Taxonomy ==
The species was described by Roewer in 1959 from Namibia. It is known from both sexes.

== See also ==
- Citizen science observations for Allocosa exserta at iNaturalist
