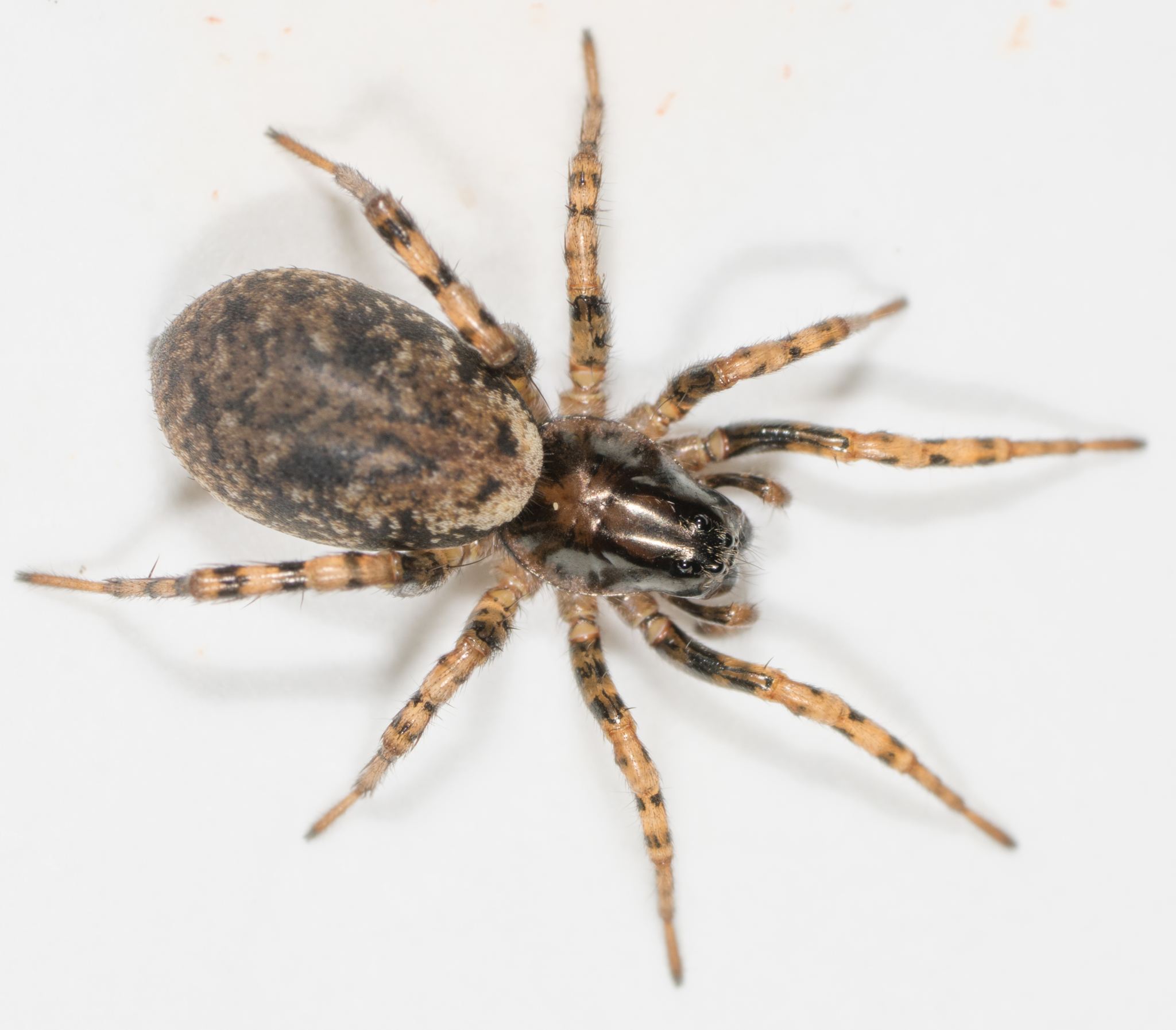
- Adult female

Scientific classification
- Kingdom: Animalia
- Phylum: Arthropoda
- Subphylum: Chelicerata
- Class: Arachnida
- Order: Araneae
- Infraorder: Araneomorphae
- Family: Lycosidae
- Genus: Allocosa
- Species: A. subparva

Binomial name
- Allocosa subparva Dondale & Redner, 1983

= Allocosa subparva =

Species of wolf spider

Allocosa subparva is a species of wolf spider in the family Lycosidae. They are found throughout western North America, as far north as Oregon to Idaho and as far south as Nayarit, Mexico.

== Description ==
Allocosa subpara is a small wolf spider with a body length ranging between 4.8–7.9 mm (0.19–0.31 in) for males and 5.7–9.3 mm (0.22–0.37 in) for females. The carapace varies from reddish-brown to black, with an indistinct median band (but lacking a pale submarginal band), dark lateral margins, and lacking setae. The sternum, chelicerae, and legs range from orange to black. Each femur and tibia has two black rings. The abdomen is typically a dull yellow with black spots on the dorsum and occasionally with paired, dark longitudinal bands on the venter.

=== Identification ===
Males of Allocosa subparva can be discerned from other visually similar species by the combination of the distal process of the median apophysis folded and covering (or nearly covering) the basal process, as well as the base of the embolus being visible when viewed ventrally. Females of A. subparva have an epigynum with a dorsal excavation visible through the ventral wall and open dorsally. More detailed descriptive diagnostic features with illustrations can be found in Dondale and Redner 1983.

==== Visual identification ====
Unlike many other wolf spiders, the cephalothorax of Allocosa subparva is dark and without a prominent coat of setae, giving the carapace a glossy appearance.

== Habitat ==
Allocosa subparva has been observed in various habitats, all at elevations of up to 2,200 meters, most often on lake and river shorelines, stream beds, and under stones. This species was observed less frequently on grasses and lawns.

== Seasonality ==
Mature females can be found year-round. Except March and November, mature males have been documented every month.
