= Allocosa chamberlini =

Scientific classification
- Kingdom: Animalia
- Phylum: Arthropoda
- Subphylum: Chelicerata
- Class: Arachnida
- Order: Araneae
- Infraorder: Araneomorphae
- Family: Lycosidae
- Genus: Allocosa
- Species: A. chamberlini

Binomial name
- Allocosa chamberlini (Gertsch, 1934)

Species of spider

Allocosa chamberlini is a species of wolf spider in the family Lycosidae. It is found in the United States.
