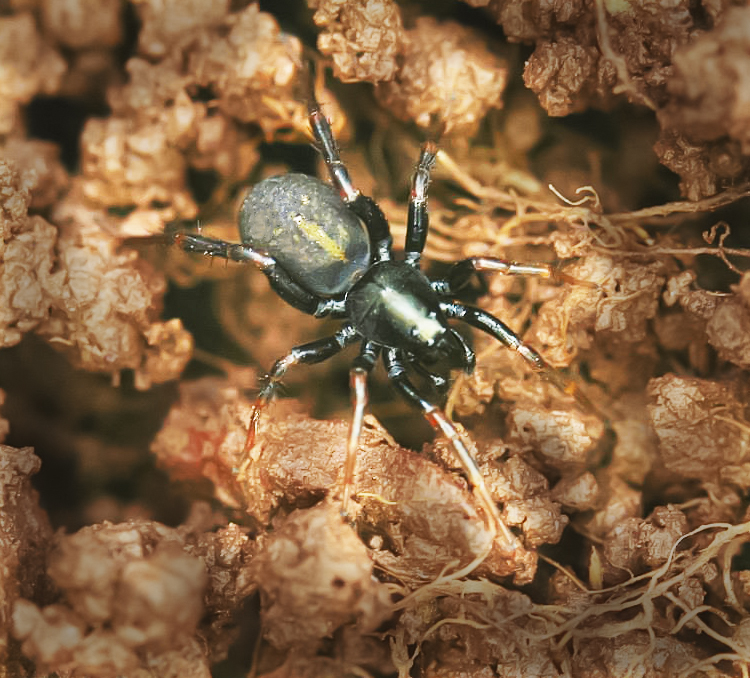

Scientific classification
- Kingdom: Animalia
- Phylum: Arthropoda
- Subphylum: Chelicerata
- Class: Arachnida
- Order: Araneae
- Infraorder: Araneomorphae
- Family: Lycosidae
- Genus: Allocosa
- Species: A. funerea

Binomial name
- Allocosa funerea (Hentz, 1844)

Synonyms
- Lycosa funerea Hentz, 1844 (basionym)

= Allocosa funerea =

Species of spider

Allocosa funerea is a species of wolf spider in the family Lycosidae. It is found in the United States, from Texas and Florida north to Kansas, Michigan, and Massachusetts. GBIF suggests a wider distribution reaching Canada.

Males measure 3.5–4.9 mm (0.14–0.19 in) and females 4–5.6 mm (0.16–0.22 in) in total length.

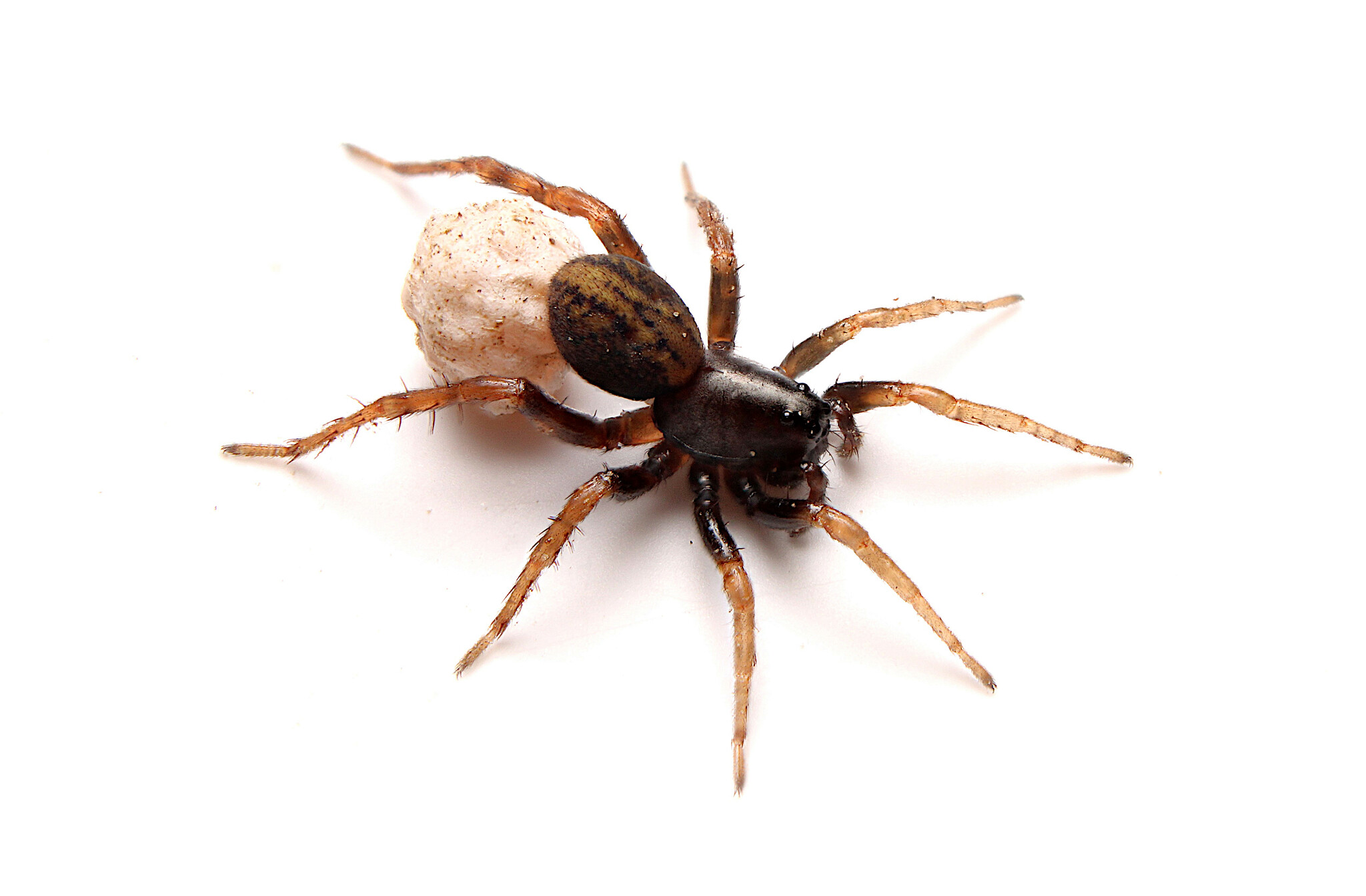
Female A. funerea with egg sac
