= Allocosa umtalica =

Zimbabwe Allocosa Wolf Spider

Scientific classification
- Kingdom: Animalia
- Phylum: Arthropoda
- Subphylum: Chelicerata
- Class: Arachnida
- Order: Araneae
- Infraorder: Araneomorphae
- Family: Lycosidae
- Genus: Allocosa
- Species: A. umtalica

Binomial name
- Allocosa umtalica (Purcell, 1903)

Synonyms
- Lycosa umtalica Purcell, 1903; Trochosa umtalica Caporiacco, 1947

Species of spider

Allocosa umtalica is a species of spider in the family Lycosidae. It is commonly known as the Zimbabwe Allocosa wolf spider.

== Distribution ==
Allocosa umtalica is known from Tanzania, Eswatini, Zimbabwe, and South Africa.

In South Africa, it is recorded from Gauteng and Limpopo.

== Habitat and ecology ==
The species is a free running ground dweller sampled from the Grassland and Savanna Biomes at altitudes ranging from 181 to 1486 m.

== Conservation ==
Allocosa umtalica is listed as Least Concern by the South African National Biodiversity Institute due to its wide geographical range. The species is protected in Blouberg Nature Reserve and Lekgalameetse Nature Reserve.

== Taxonomy ==
Allocosa umtalica was originally described by Purcell in 1903 from Zimbabwe. It was revised by Roewer in 1959 and is known from both sexes.
