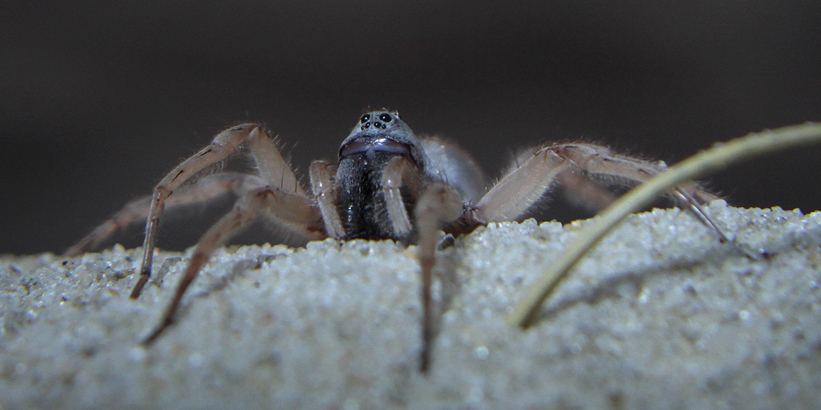
- male A. brasiliensis

Scientific classification
- Kingdom: Animalia
- Phylum: Arthropoda
- Subphylum: Chelicerata
- Class: Arachnida
- Order: Araneae
- Infraorder: Araneomorphae
- Family: Lycosidae
- Genus: Allocosa
- Species: A. brasiliensis

Binomial name
- Allocosa brasiliensis (Petrunkevitch, [1910])

Synonyms
- Allocosa difficilis (Mello-Leitão, 1951); Allocosa senex (Mello-Leitão, 1945); Araucaniocosa difficilis Mello-Leitão, 1951; Glieschiella senex Mello-Leitão, 1945; Lycosa difficilis (Mello-Leitão, 1951); Moenkhausiana brasiliensis Petrunkevitch, [1910]

= Allocosa brasiliensis =

Species of spider

Allocosa brasiliensis is a burrowing wolf spider species from southern South America. Long known to science, it remained almost unstudied until its unusual sexual behavior was described in the early 21st century.

This ground-dwelling spider is native to mainly coastal areas, from southeastern Brazil via Uruguay and Argentina to southern Chile, though its known occurrences are patchy. To what extent it is found on the Atlantic coast south of the Río de la Plata remains largely unknown, for example. While the males have been known for over a century, the females were only described in 1980.

== Description ==
A. brasiliensis is a mid-sized cryptic light brown spider of robust build, with a body size of well over 1 cm (0.5 in and more) when fully grown, up to almost twice this size in the largest specimens. The cephalothorax has an inconspicuous darker stripe pattern reminiscent of that found in many lycosids, but the opisthosoma is patterned with yellower and darker spots the approximate size of sand grains. Males and females look alike in color, but differ in size and genitals.

Adult females have a cephalothorax carapace some 4–5 mm wide and some 6–7 mm long on average. Quite unusually for spiders in general, adult males are about 20% larger. Still, as usual for wolf spiders the females are more robustly built, wider-bodied and shorter-legged. In both sexes the four middle legs are shortest, the hind pair longest and the front pair intermediate. Even the shortest four legs of the adult females usually measure more than 1 cm. The longest leg pair is usually 2 cm or more in adult males and may measure up to about 2.5 cm (1 in). In females, it may grow to almost 1 in, but is usually around 2 cm.

== Taxonomy ==
A. brasiliensis was first described to the New York Academy of Sciences in 1909 by Russian-American arachnologist A. Petrunkevitch; the description was based on a male from Brazil and published in the academy's annual volume released in 1910. Petrunkevitch placed the species in a new genus Moenkhausiana, due to its unusual and distinct spinnerets and leg proportions. Initially considered monotypic, C.F. de Mello-Leitão later described a presumed relative "M." argentinensis.

But soon thereafter, when he studied spiders from northern Argentina, he became so convinced of their distinctness as to consider them ant spiders (Zodariidae) and in 1945 re-described the present species as Glieschiella senex, perhaps not recognizing it because he misidentified his specimen as a female (it was actually also a male, like the type specimen of A. brasiliensis). In the supposed ant spider genus, it was associated with "G." alticeps (see below) and the type species of Glieschiella, "G." halophila.

Yet in 1951 Mello-Leitão, when studying some spiders caught at Maullin (Chile), again described A. brasiliensis anew, in yet another monotypic genus Araucaniocosa. Subsequently, it was mainly studied under the 1951 name – Araucaniocosa difficilis –, and affiliated closely with the "European tarantulas" (Lycosa), even included there as a sub-genus. When the females were first described, they were also treated under the 1951 name, as they were also based on individuals from Chile.

Today, Moenkhausiana and Glieschiella are treated as junior synonym of the large genus Allocosa, which is not considered to be very close to Lycosa as wolf spiders go. As regards the species which were historically affiliated with A. brasiliensis, A. alticeps is generally considered valid, while "A. argentinensis" and "A. halophila" are apparently based on immature specimens and considered nomina dubia. The former at least was described from outside the known range of A. brasiliensis – from Isla Tehuel Malal, Río Negro Province, southeastern Argentina –, but restudy would be needed to determine whether any of them is a distinct taxon. Whether the (possibly widely allopatric) Chilean population is a taxonomically distinct subspecies has not been studied in detail; certainly however, it does not seem to be a distinct species and has no conspicuous difference in size.

== Ecology and behavior ==
A. brasiliensis is nocturnal, resting at daytime in burrows in sand dunes along river mouths and the coast of at least part of the Southern Cone. The burrows of adults are quite exactly 1 cm wide and usually run steeply down, with a length of a few cm (1–3 in). Male burrows tend to be longer/deeper, up to 10 cm and more (4 in). The spiders are more frequently found on the land-side of dunes, which is better protected against strong winds, and prefer open habitat to vegetation when outside their burrows. The reproductive peak takes place in January (after midsummer), with the highest surface and foraging activity shown during Southern hemisphere summer.

In general, the habitat is cool and humid for its region, at best subtropical, the air being constantly moistened, usually by brine that is carried from the sea by the wind. In typical habitat at El Pinar, Uruguay, average air and ground temperatures were measured just around 20 °C (68 °F) in November (early summer). Relative humidity was almost 100%, even though the air was constantly exchanged even in the area of ground effect. The vegetation was rather monotonous, dominated by ragwort (Senecio) and Panicum grass. Potential A. brasiliensis prey that was commonly encountered were Acromyrmex ants, Tetragonoderus ground beetles and striped earwigs of genus Labidura. Rhino beetles of the genus Thronistes were also common in that habitat, but presumably too tough for the spiders to eat. As a possible predator of the spiders, a dune-adapted species of tree iguana (Liolaemus) was noted.

Owing to its harsh habitat, with high variability of weather conditions and prey availability, A. brasiliensis is a highly opportunistic free-roaming predator, feeding mostly on spiders, beetles, flies and ants. Altogether, the species prefers to feed on spiders, which make up about one-third of its diet; indeed, other Allocosa are typically eaten more often than any other kind of prey during the life of any wild-living A. brasiliensis. But the mainstay food actually varies quite a lot between the seasons, and in general these spider's food choice is shaped by availability more than by preference. Less frequently other arthropods are caught, e.g. true bugs (Hemiptera) or crickets, grasshoppers etc. (Orthoptera). Ants such as Acromyrmex or Dorymyrmex are often caught on their trails or during their nuptial flights, and the nimble and well-camouflaged spiders manage to surprise Lepidoptera (butterflies and moths) resting on the ground surprisingly often. As regards cannibalism, the adult female A. brasiliensis are if anything less prone to eat conspecifics than spiders in general, let alone the adult females which in many species are famous for habitually feeding on their mates. In A. brasiliensis by contrast, immatures are voraciously cannibalistic on each other and even more often eat females of the smaller sympatric relative A. alticeps. Most remarkably however, the adult males include a considerable number of conspecific females in their diet.

Adults reach maturity at around 9–10 months of age and after around 10 (up to one dozen) moults; females grow up somewhat faster than males, and often have one moult less. On average females tend to be slightly shorter-lived than males at least in captivity, where the latter typically live for almost 500 days. An extreme age of almost 2 years has been recorded in a captive female; generally the species seems to be semelparous.

In captivity, these spiders have been maintained from wild-collected eggs to maturity and senescence in petri dishes, one spider per dish. A thin layer of sea sand and a watered lump of clean cotton wool create a favorable microclimate and allow the spiders to drink. Spiderlings fared well in dishes of 3.5 cm diameter and about 1 cm height; as they grow (around the third to fourth instar) they will need to be housed in larger dishes (about 10 cm in diameter and over 1 cm in height). As captive-bred food, Drosophila flies up to the fourth instar and subsequently Tenebrio mealworms of appropriate size, and for adults also small Orange-spotted Cockroaches (Blaptica dubia), were used with success. Adults will need three such food items per week. Captive breeding attempts require sizeable terraria due to the spiders' burrowing and cannibalistic habits; a 15-cm (>5 in) sand bottom with 5 cm (2 in) air above has been found to work; the base area should not be much less than 450 cm^{2} (0.5 ft^{2}). The mating terrarium needs to be divided by a barrier, the above ground part of which is removed when male and female have constructed their burrow.

=== Sexual role reversal ===
A. brasiliensis males use pheromones to attract females, in contrast to most other burrowing wolf spiders, where the females attract the males. Males have been observed to specifically cannibalize on older females that were lured into the male's burrow, while preferring mating with virgins. The first egg sac of A. brasiliensis females contains more eggs than later ones, which, together with the harsh habitat, gives this behavior an evolutionary advantage.

The smaller and stronger-marked relative Allocosa alticeps, which lives sympatrically in the same habitat, seems to show a similar sexual role reversal. Although cannibalism is not rare among spiders, the selective hunting of females by males is as of 2010 unknown in any other spider species; even A. alticeps does not seem to be conspicuously cannibalistic.

These Allocosa are the only known wolf spiders adapted to living on the Uruguayan coastline (though see above for possible relatives). Sexual size dimorphism seems to be more pronounced in A. brasiliensis, while A. alticeps females and males are often enough about the same size. Both sexes of the present species are usually found equally frequently; in A. alticeps females appear to outnumber males by far. Reproductive isolation is ultimately achieved via behavior and genital anatomy, but quite often inspecting the differently-sized and differently-smelling burrow entrance will already allow these spiders to identify conspecifics. In addition, the species also seem to have different microhabitat preferences.
