= Allocosa gracilitarsis =

Polokwane Allocosa Wolf Spider

Scientific classification
- Kingdom: Animalia
- Phylum: Arthropoda
- Subphylum: Chelicerata
- Class: Arachnida
- Order: Araneae
- Infraorder: Araneomorphae
- Family: Lycosidae
- Genus: Allocosa
- Species: A. gracilitarsis

Binomial name
- Allocosa gracilitarsis (Purcell, 1903)

Synonyms
- Lycosa gracilitarsis Purcell, 1903

Species of spider

Allocosa gracilitarsis is a species of spider in the family Lycosidae. It is commonly known as the Polokwane Allocosa wolf spider.

== Distribution ==
Allocosa gracilitarsis is known from Namibia and South Africa. In South Africa, the species is known from the five provinces Eastern Cape, Gauteng, Limpopo, Mpumalanga, and Northern Cape.

== Habitat and ecology ==
The species is a free-running ground dweller sampled from the Grassland, Nama Karoo, and Savanna Biomes at altitudes ranging from 1096 to 1762 m.

== Conservation ==
Allocosa gracilitarsis is listed as Least Concern by the South African National Biodiversity Institute due to its wide geographical distribution range. The species is protected in the Tsolwana Nature Reserve and Klipriviersberg Nature Reserve.

== Taxonomy ==
The species was originally described in 1903 from a Mission Station near Pietersburg (now Polokwane). The species was revised by Roewer in 1959 and is known from both sexes.
