= Allocosa aurichelis =

Kimberley Allocosa Wolf Spider

Scientific classification
- Kingdom: Animalia
- Phylum: Arthropoda
- Subphylum: Chelicerata
- Class: Arachnida
- Order: Araneae
- Infraorder: Araneomorphae
- Family: Lycosidae
- Genus: Allocosa
- Species: A. aurichelis

Binomial name
- Allocosa aurichelis Roewer, 1959

Species of spider

Allocosa aurichelis is a species of spider in the family Lycosidae. It is endemic to South Africa and is commonly known as the Kimberley Allocosa wolf spider.

== Distribution ==
Allocosa aurichelis is known from several localities in the Northern Cape.

== Habitat and ecology ==
The species is a free running ground dweller sampled from the Savanna Biome at altitudes ranging from 1146 to 1218 m.

== Conservation ==
Allocosa aurichelis is listed as Data Deficient for Taxonomic reasons by the South African National Biodiversity Institute. The status of the species remains obscure and additional sampling is needed to collect the male and to determine the species' range. It is protected in the Benfontein Game Reserve and Tswalu Kalahari Reserve.

== Taxonomy ==
The species was described by Roewer in 1959 from Kimberley. It is known only from the female.
