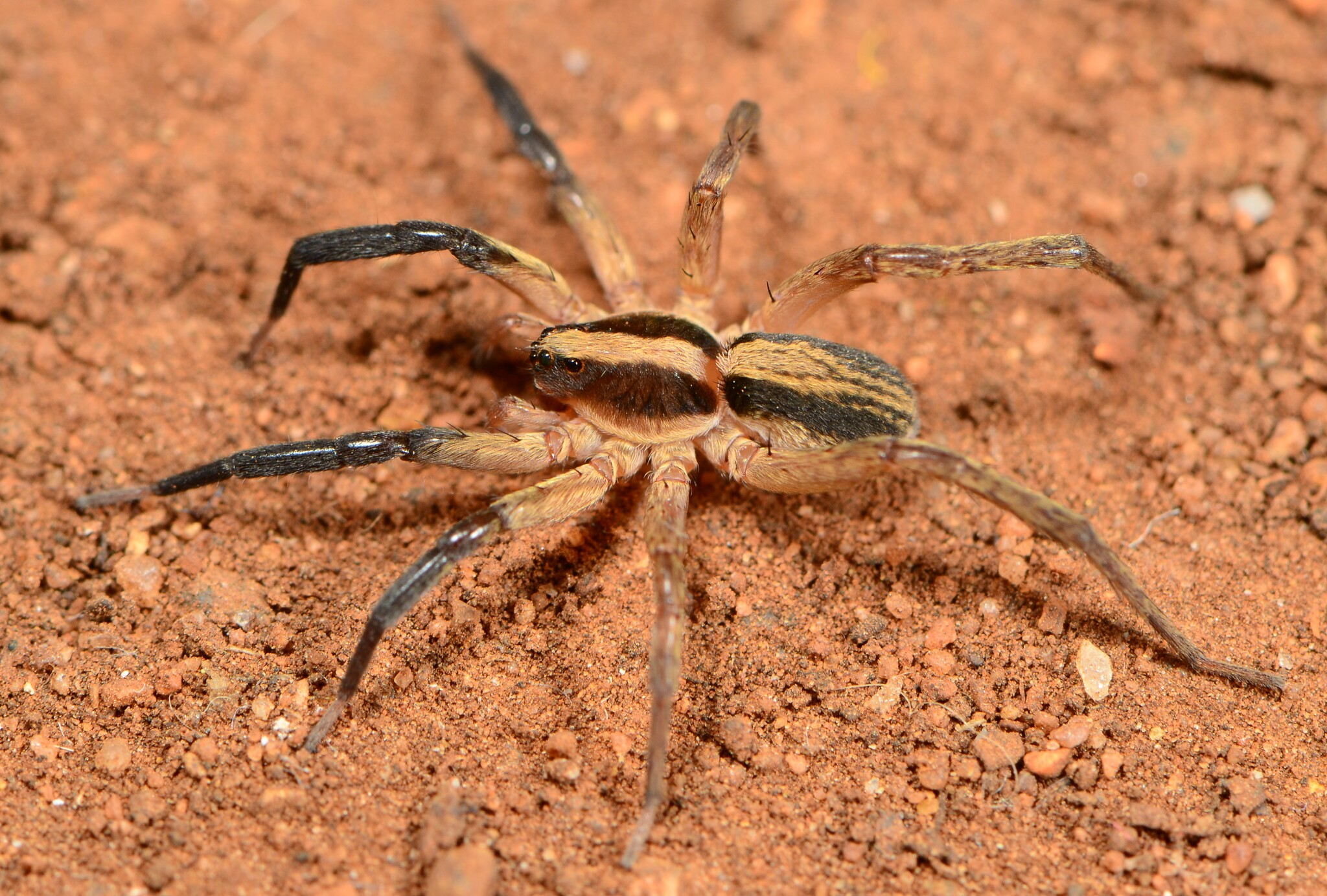
- female
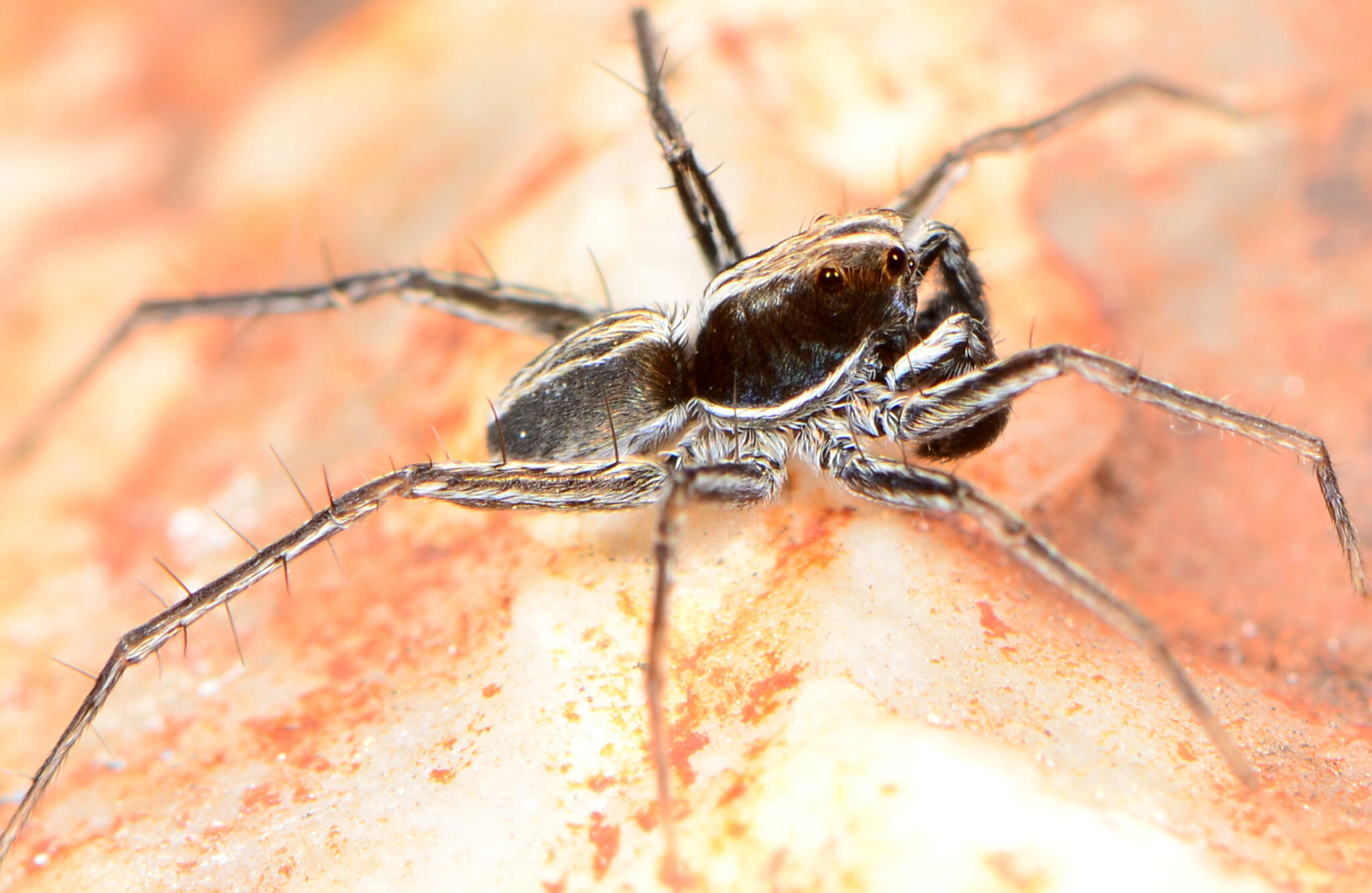
- male

Scientific classification
- Kingdom: Animalia
- Phylum: Arthropoda
- Subphylum: Chelicerata
- Class: Arachnida
- Order: Araneae
- Infraorder: Araneomorphae
- Family: Lycosidae
- Genus: Allocosa
- Species: A. lawrencei

Binomial name
- Allocosa lawrencei (Roewer, 1951)

Synonyms
- Lycosa maritima Lawrence, 1938; Lycosa lawrencei Roewer, 1951; Hogna lawrencei Roewer, 1955

= Allocosa lawrencei =

Lawrence's Allocosa Wolf Spider

Species of spider

Allocosa lawrencei is a species of spider in the family Lycosidae. It is commonly known as Lawrence's Allocosa wolf spider.

== Distribution ==
Allocosa lawrencei is known from Eswatini and the South African provinces Gauteng, KwaZulu-Natal, Limpopo, Mpumalanga, and Northern Cape.

== Habitat and ecology ==
Allocosa lawrencei is a free running ground dweller sampled from the Grassland, Savanna, and Thicket Biomes at altitudes ranging from 4 to 1730 m. It has also been sampled from vineyards.

== Conservation ==
Allocosa lawrencei is listed as Least Concern by the South African National Biodiversity Institute due to its wide geographical distribution range. It is protected in more than 15 protected areas.

== Etymology ==
The species is named after Reginald Frederick Lawrence, a South African zoologist who made significant contributions to arachnology.

== Taxonomy ==
The species was originally described by Lawrence in 1938 as Lycosa maritima from Umhlali in KwaZulu-Natal, but this name was preoccupied by Hentz, 1844. Roewer provided the replacement name lawrencei in 1951. The species is known from both sexes.
