= Allocosa montana =

Tanzania Allocosa Wolf Spider

Scientific classification
- Kingdom: Animalia
- Phylum: Arthropoda
- Subphylum: Chelicerata
- Class: Arachnida
- Order: Araneae
- Infraorder: Araneomorphae
- Family: Lycosidae
- Genus: Allocosa
- Species: A. montana

Binomial name
- Allocosa montana Roewer, 1959

Species of spider

Allocosa montana is a species of spider in the family Lycosidae. It is commonly known as the Tanzania Allocosa wolf spider.

== Distribution ==
Allocosa montana is known from Botswana, Tanzania, Zimbabwe, and South Africa.

In South Africa, the species is known from the provinces Gauteng, Limpopo, Mpumalanga, and KwaZulu-Natal.

== Habitat and ecology ==
Allocosa montana is a free-running ground dweller sampled from the Grassland and Savanna biomes at altitudes ranging from 33 to 1624 m.

== Conservation ==
Allocosa montana is listed as Least Concern by the South African National Biodiversity Institute due to its wide geographical range. The species is known from two protected areas: uMkhuze Game Reserve and Atherstone Nature Reserve.

== Taxonomy ==
Allocosa montana was described by Roewer in 1959 from Tanzania. It is known from both sexes.
