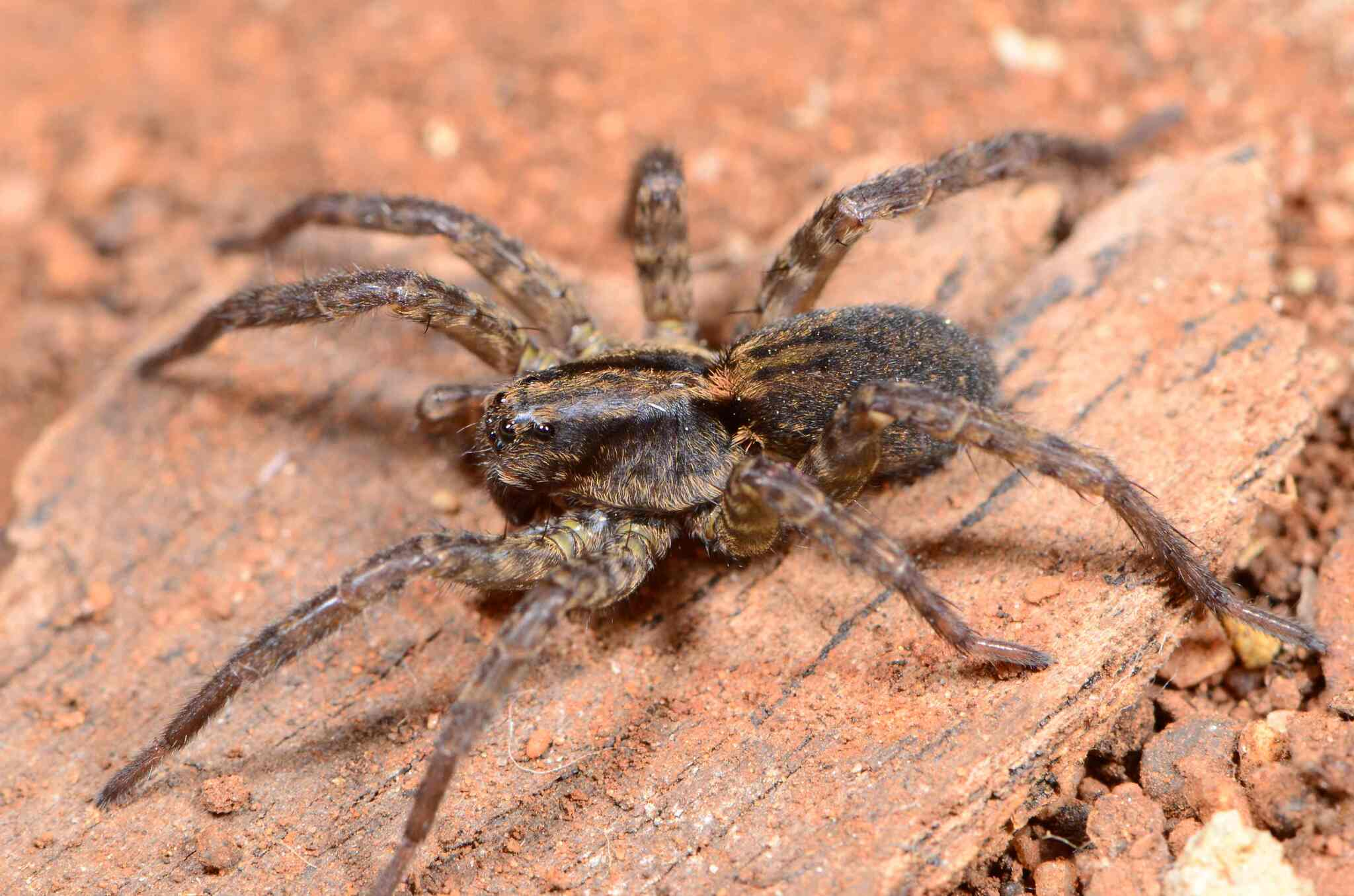
- female
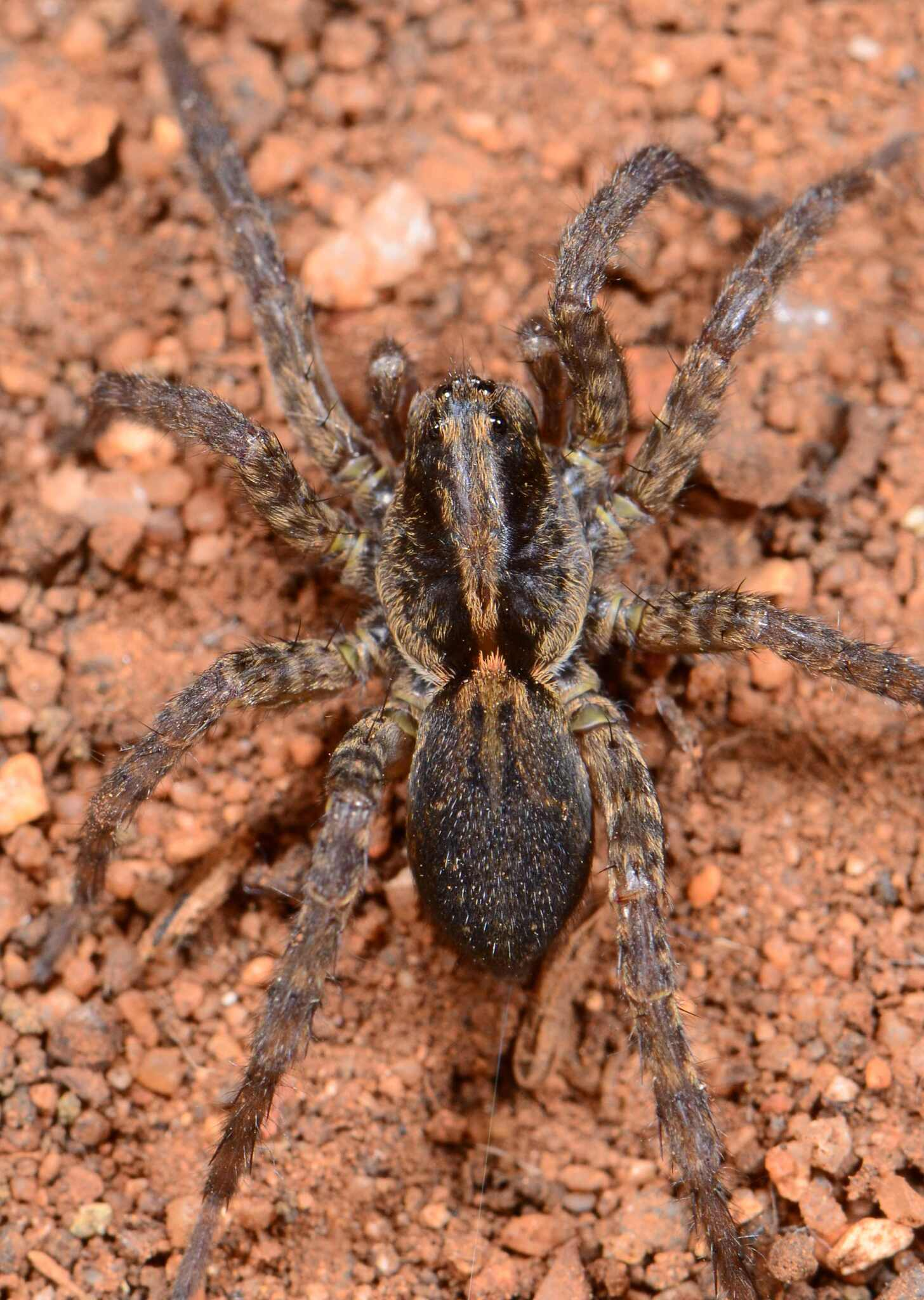
- female

Scientific classification
- Kingdom: Animalia
- Phylum: Arthropoda
- Subphylum: Chelicerata
- Class: Arachnida
- Order: Araneae
- Infraorder: Araneomorphae
- Family: Lycosidae
- Genus: Allocosa
- Species: A. aurata

Binomial name
- Allocosa aurata (Purcell, 1903)

Synonyms
- Lycosa aurata Purcell, 1903

= Allocosa aurata =

Barberton Allocosa Wolf Spider

Species of spider

Allocosa aurata is a species of spider in the family Lycosidae. It is endemic to South Africa and is commonly known as the Barberton Allocosa wolf spider.

== Distribution ==
Allocosa aurata is known from four provinces of South Africa: Free State, KwaZulu-Natal, Limpopo, and Mpumalanga.

== Habitat and ecology ==
The species is a free running ground-dweller sampled from the Savanna Biome at altitudes ranging from 563 to 1816 m.

== Description ==
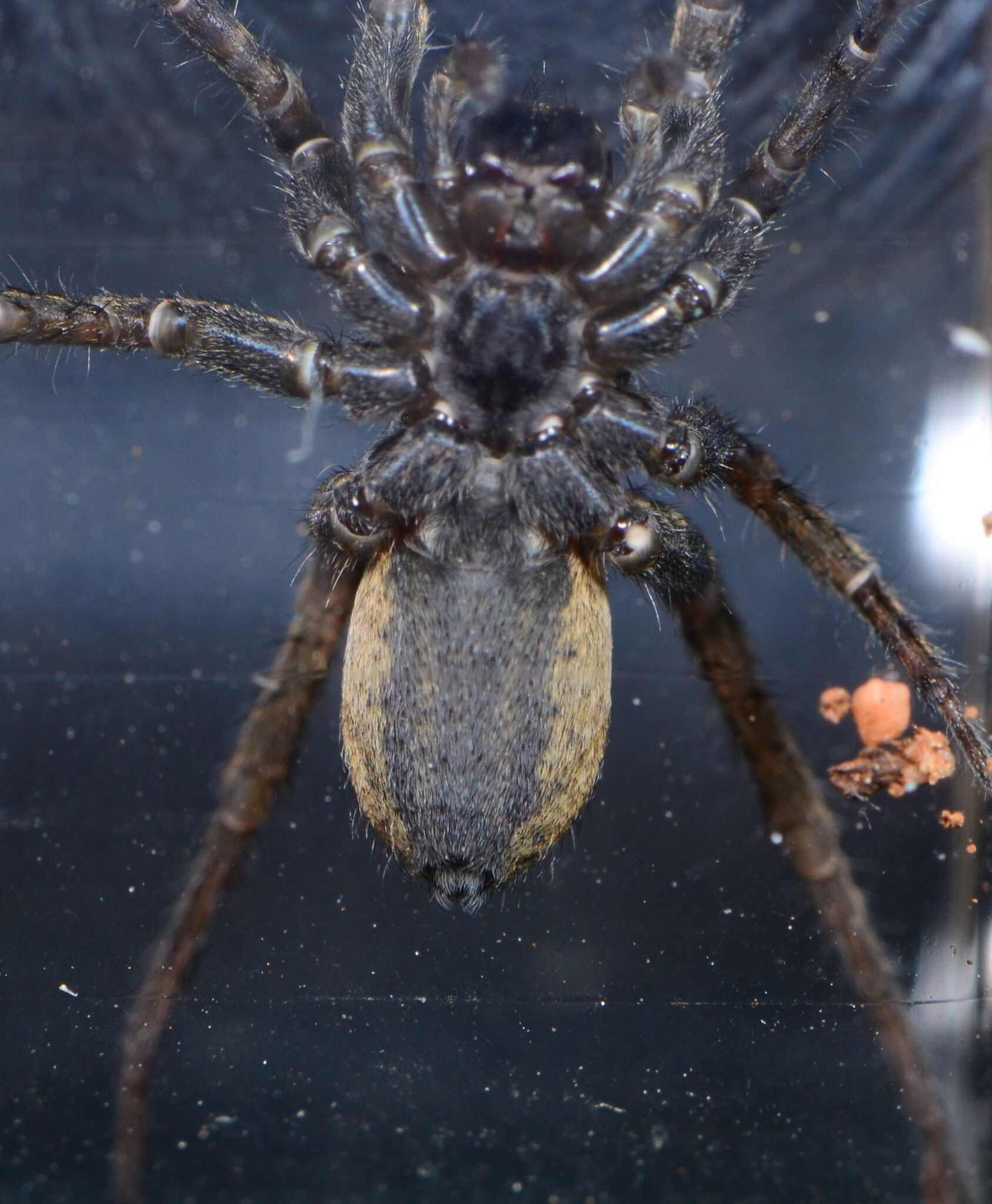
female, ventral view

== Conservation ==
Allocosa aurata is listed as Least Concern by the South African National Biodiversity Institute due to its wide geographical range. The species is protected in the Lekgalameetse Nature Reserve.

== Taxonomy ==
The species was originally described by Purcell in 1903 from Barberton in Mpumalanga. The species was revised by Roewer in 1959 and is known only from the female.
