= Allocosa algoensis =

Port Elizabeth Allocosa Wolf Spider

Scientific classification
- Kingdom: Animalia
- Phylum: Arthropoda
- Subphylum: Chelicerata
- Class: Arachnida
- Order: Araneae
- Infraorder: Araneomorphae
- Family: Lycosidae
- Genus: Allocosa
- Species: A. algoensis

Binomial name
- Allocosa algoensis (Pocock, 1900)

Synonyms
- Lycosa algoensis Pocock, 1900; Lycosa bessiana Pocock, 1900

Species of spider

Allocosa algoensis is a species of spider in the family Lycosidae. It is endemic to South Africa and is commonly known as the Port Elizabeth Allocosa wolf spider.

== Distribution ==
Allocosa algoensis is known only from Port Elizabeth in the Eastern Cape.

== Habitat and ecology ==
The species is a free-living ground dweller sampled from the Thicket Biome at 7 m above sea level.

== Conservation ==
Allocosa algoensis is listed as Data Deficient by the South African National Biodiversity Institute. The species has a very limited known range and the status remains obscure. Additional sampling is needed to determine the species' range.

== Taxonomy ==
The species was originally described by Pocock in 1900 from Port Elizabeth. The species has not been revised and is known from both sexes.
