= Allocosa sublata =

Scientific classification
- Kingdom: Animalia
- Phylum: Arthropoda
- Subphylum: Chelicerata
- Class: Arachnida
- Order: Araneae
- Infraorder: Araneomorphae
- Family: Lycosidae
- Genus: Allocosa
- Species: A. sublata

Binomial name
- Allocosa sublata (Montgomery, 1902)

Species of spider

Allocosa sublata is a species of wolf spider in the family Lycosidae. It is found in the United States.
