= Allocosa nebulosa =

Zaire Allocosa Wolf Spider

Scientific classification
- Kingdom: Animalia
- Phylum: Arthropoda
- Subphylum: Chelicerata
- Class: Arachnida
- Order: Araneae
- Infraorder: Araneomorphae
- Family: Lycosidae
- Genus: Allocosa
- Species: A. nebulosa

Binomial name
- Allocosa nebulosa Roewer, 1959

Species of spider

Allocosa nebulosa is a species of spider in the family Lycosidae. It is commonly known as the Zaire Allocosa wolf spider.

== Distribution ==
Allocosa nebulosa is known from Namibia, Democratic Republic of the Congo, and South Africa.

In South Africa, the species is recorded from the provinces Eastern Cape, Free State, and Gauteng.

== Habitat and ecology ==
Allocosa nebulosa is a free running ground dweller sampled from the Grassland Biome at altitudes ranging from 1385 to 1795 m.

== Conservation ==
Allocosa nebulosa is listed as Least Concern by the South African National Biodiversity Institute due to its wide geographical range in Africa. The species is protected in the National Botanical Gardens in Bloemfontein, Klipriviersberg Nature Reserve, and Suikerbosrand Nature Reserve.

== Taxonomy ==
Allocosa nebulosa was described by Roewer in 1959 from Zaire, now the Democratic Republic of the Congo. It is known from both sexes.
