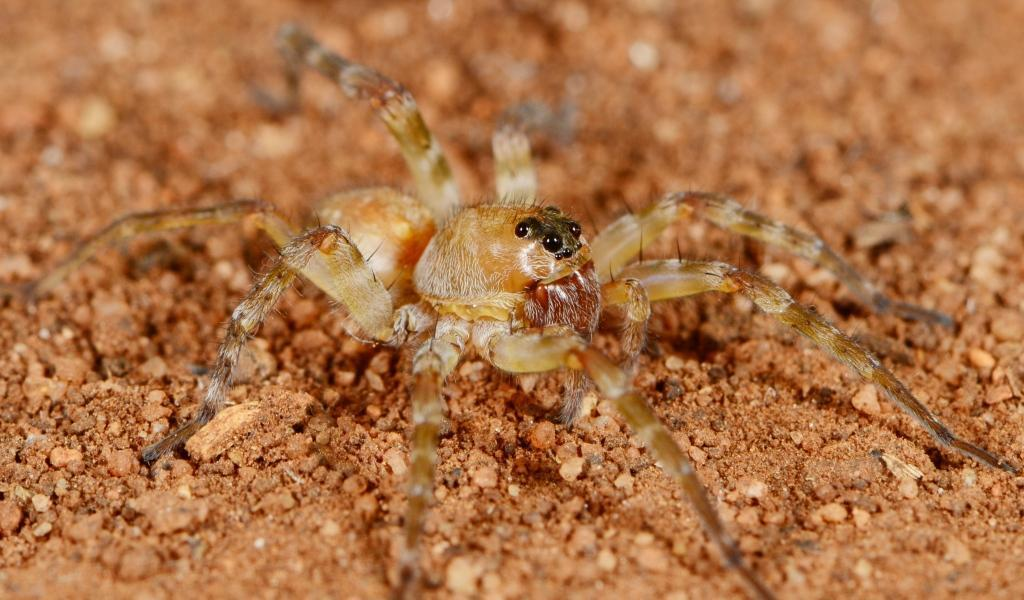

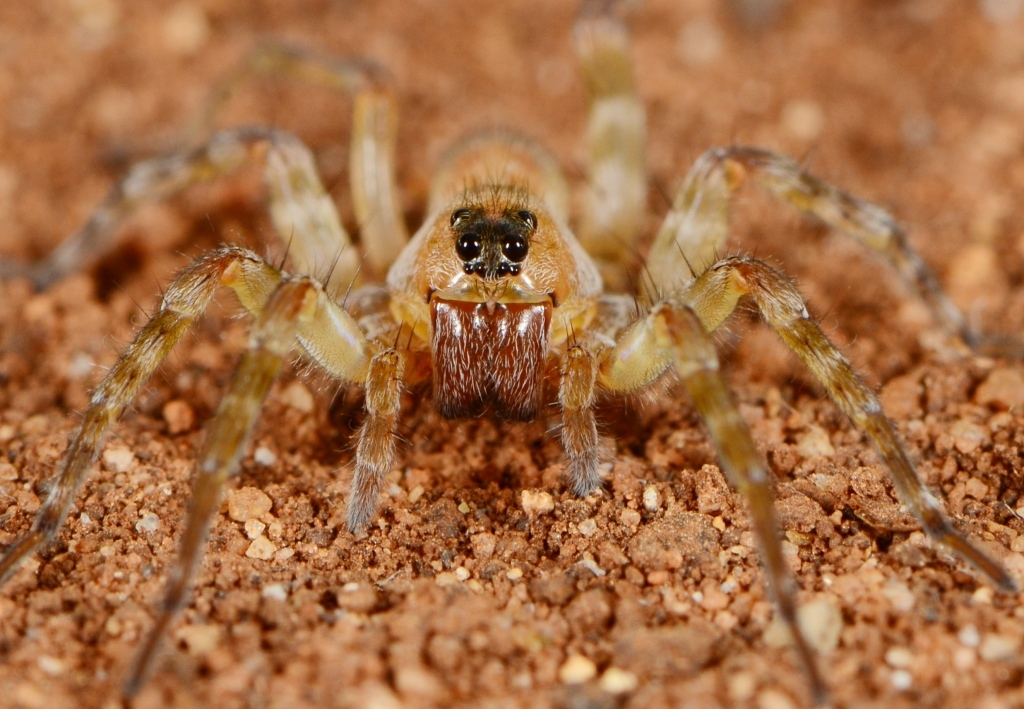

Scientific classification
- Kingdom: Animalia
- Phylum: Arthropoda
- Subphylum: Chelicerata
- Class: Arachnida
- Order: Araneae
- Infraorder: Araneomorphae
- Family: Lycosidae
- Genus: Allocosa
- Species: A. testacea

Binomial name
- Allocosa testacea Roewer, 1959

= Allocosa testacea =

Lhuvhondo Allocosa Wolf Spider

Species of spider

Allocosa testacea is a species of spider in the family Lycosidae. It is endemic to South Africa and is commonly known as the Lhuvhondo Allocosa wolf spider.

== Distribution ==
Allocosa testacea is known from the South African provinces Gauteng, Limpopo, North West, and Mpumalanga.

== Habitat and ecology ==
The species is a free running ground dweller sampled from the Savanna Biome at altitudes ranging from 475 to 1341 m.

== Description ==
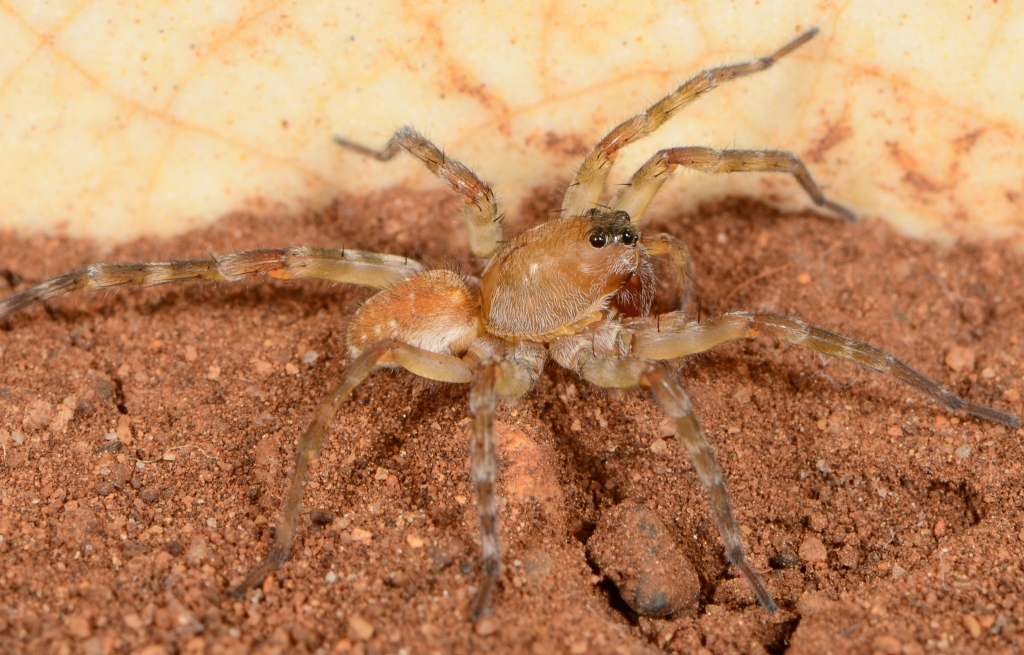
female

== Conservation ==
Allocosa testacea is listed as Data Deficient for Taxonomic reasons by the South African National Biodiversity Institute. Too little is known about the location, habitat and threats to this taxon for an assessment to be made. Placement of the species is also still problematic as only one sex is known. Additional sampling is needed to collect the male and determine the distribution range. The species is protected in the Lhuvhondo Nature Reserve.

== Taxonomy ==
The species was described by Roewer in 1959 with the type locality only given as "Ost-Transvaal". The species is known only from the female.
