= Allocosa faberrima =

Kalahari Allocosa Wolf Spider

Scientific classification
- Kingdom: Animalia
- Phylum: Arthropoda
- Subphylum: Chelicerata
- Class: Arachnida
- Order: Araneae
- Infraorder: Araneomorphae
- Family: Lycosidae
- Genus: Allocosa
- Species: A. faberrima

Binomial name
- Allocosa faberrima (Simon, 1910)

Synonyms
- Lycosa faberrima Simon, 1910

Species of spider

Allocosa faberrima is a species of spider in the family Lycosidae. It is commonly known as the Kalahari Allocosa wolf spider.

== Distribution ==
Allocosa faberrima is known from Namibia, Botswana, and South Africa.

In South Africa, the species is known only from the Western Cape.

== Habitat and ecology ==
The species is a free running ground dweller sampled from the Fynbos Biome at altitudes ranging from 143 to 1850 m.

== Conservation ==
Allocosa faberrima is listed as Least Concern by the South African National Biodiversity Institute due to its wide African distribution range. The species is protected in the Cederberg Wilderness Area.

== Taxonomy ==
The species was originally described by Simon in 1910 from Botswana. The species was revised by Roewer in 1959 and is known from both sexes.
