= Allocosa caboverdensis =

Scientific classification
- Kingdom: Animalia
- Phylum: Arthropoda
- Subphylum: Chelicerata
- Class: Arachnida
- Order: Araneae
- Infraorder: Araneomorphae
- Family: Lycosidae
- Genus: Allocosa
- Species: A. caboverdensis

Binomial name
- Allocosa caboverdensis Schmidt & Krause 1995

Species of spider

Allocosa caboverdensis is a species of wolf spider of the family Lycosidae, endemic to Cape Verde. The species was first described by Günter E. W. Schmidt and Rolf Harald Krause in 1995. Its species name refers to Cape Verde, where it is found.
