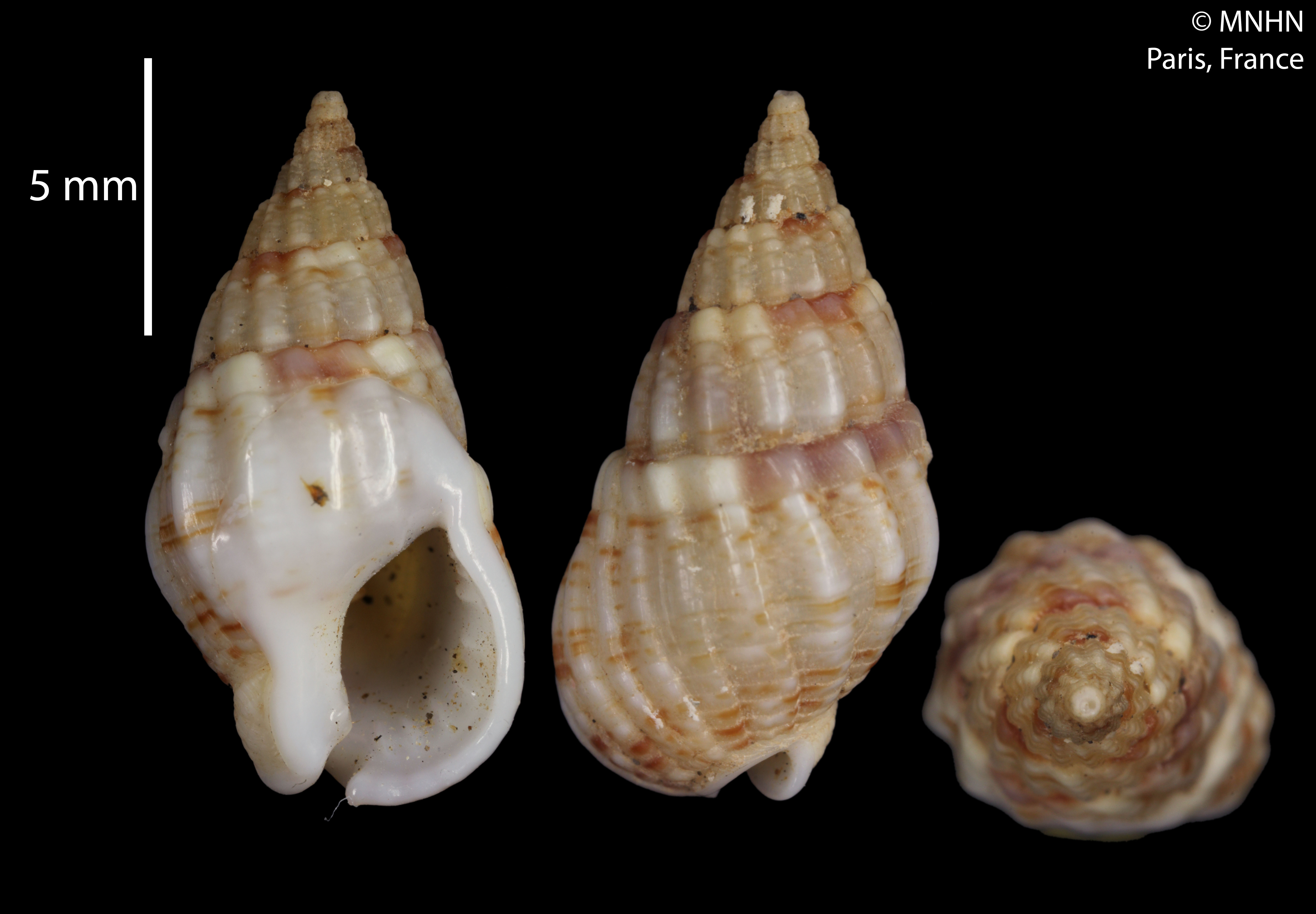
- Shell of Tritia caboverdensis (paratype at MNHN, Paris)

Scientific classification
- Kingdom: Animalia
- Phylum: Mollusca
- Class: Gastropoda
- Subclass: Caenogastropoda
- Order: Neogastropoda
- Family: Nassariidae
- Genus: Tritia
- Species: T. caboverdensis

Binomial name
- Tritia caboverdensis (Rolán, 1984)

Synonyms
- Hinia caboverdensis Rolán, 1984 (original combination); Nassarius ferussaci auct.non Payraudeau, B.-C., 1826; Nassarius (Nassarius) caboverdensis (Rolán, 1984)

= Tritia caboverdensis =

Species of gastropod

Tritia caboverdensis is a species of sea snail, a marine gastropod mollusk in the family Nassariidae, the Nassa mud snails or dog whelks.

== Description ==
The length of the shell varies between 8 mm and 18 mm. The shell of Tritia caboverdensis is typically elongated and ovate, with a moderately high spire and a well-defined aperture. The surface is sculptured with axial ribs and fine spiral striae, giving it a slightly textured appearance. Coloration generally ranges from light brown to grayish tones, often with darker banding or mottled patterns that provide camouflage in sandy and rocky substrates. The outer lip is thin, and the siphonal canal is short but distinct.

== Distribution ==
This species occurs in the Atlantic Ocean off the Cape Verde Islands.
