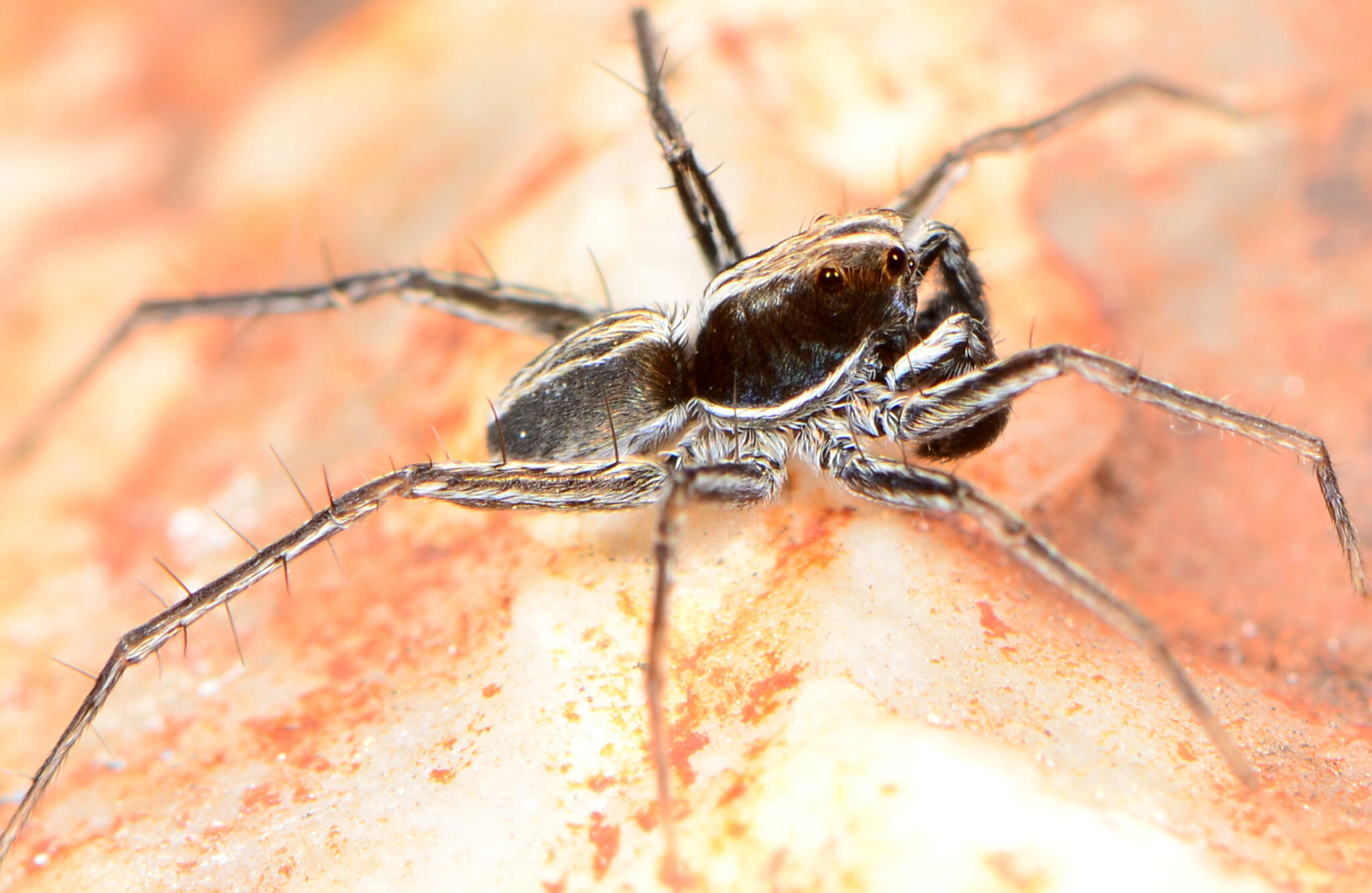
- male A. lawrencei
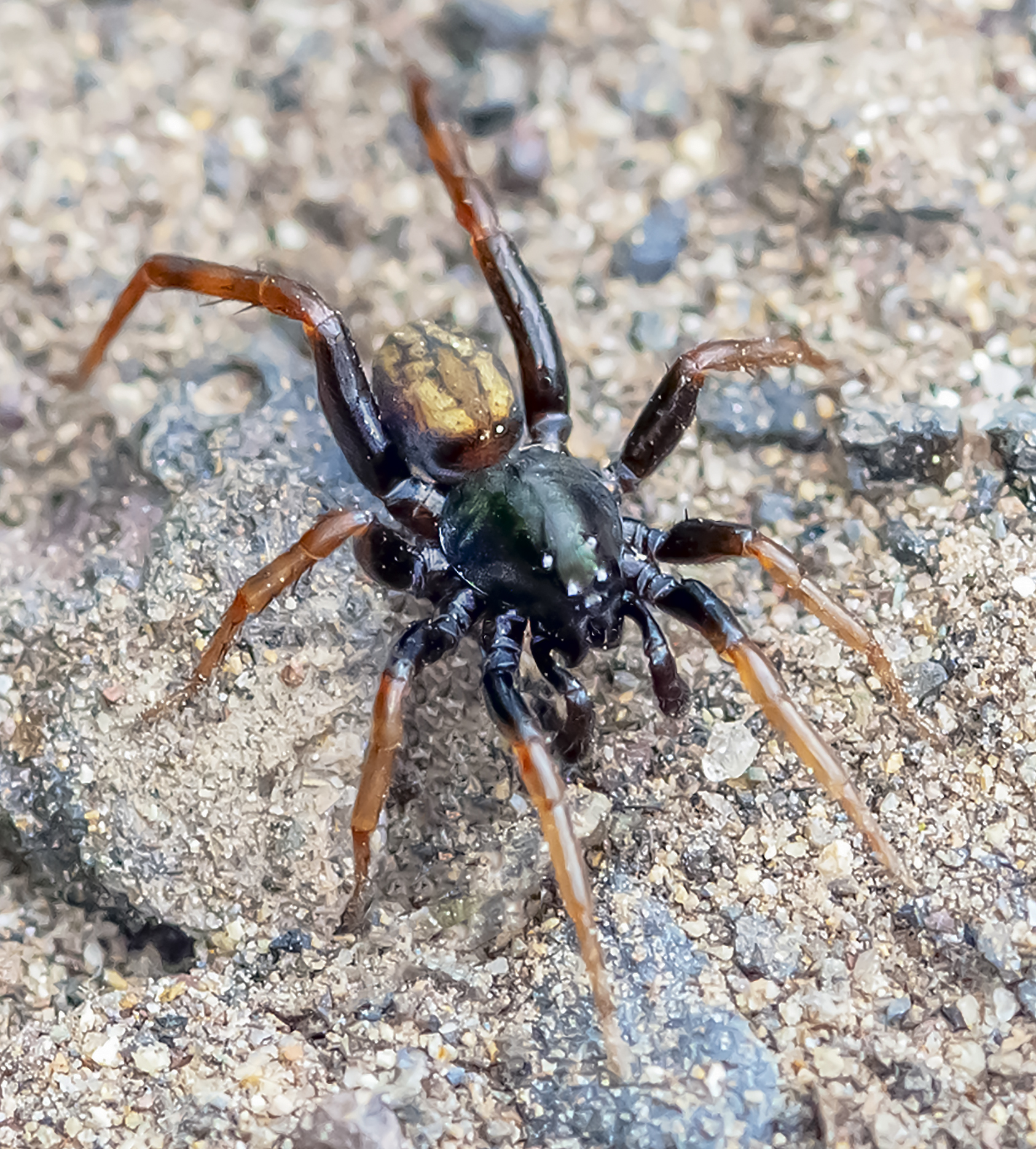
- A. funerea

Scientific classification
- Kingdom: Animalia
- Phylum: Arthropoda
- Subphylum: Chelicerata
- Class: Arachnida
- Order: Araneae
- Infraorder: Araneomorphae
- Family: Lycosidae
- Genus: Allocosa; Banks, 1900

Type species
- Lycosa funerea Hentz, 1844

Diversity
- 130 species

= Allocosa =

Genus of spiders

Allocosa is a spider genus of the wolf spider family, Lycosidae. The more than hundred recognized species are spread worldwide.

== Description ==
The carapace is sometimes dark but usually has a pale median band and pale submarginal bands, with setae usually restricted to the eye area and mid-dorsal line. Viewed from above, the carapace is convex at the lateral margins and narrowed at the level of legs I.

The anterior eye row is slightly procurved, equal in length to the middle row or somewhat shorter, with anterior median eyes larger than anterior laterals and slightly closer to anterior laterals than to each other. The anterior median eyes are located on a small prominence. The sternum is yellow, orange, brown, or black.

The chelicerae have 2 or 3 promarginal and 3 retromarginal teeth. The legs are usually dark orange or red-brown with notched trochanters. The abdomen is ovoid with the dorsum usually dull yellow with fine to dense black spots or reticulation. The venter is dull yellow or orange, sometimes with small black spots or paired longitudinal dark bands. The anterior end has a cluster of dark, curved, erect setae.

== Lifestyle ==
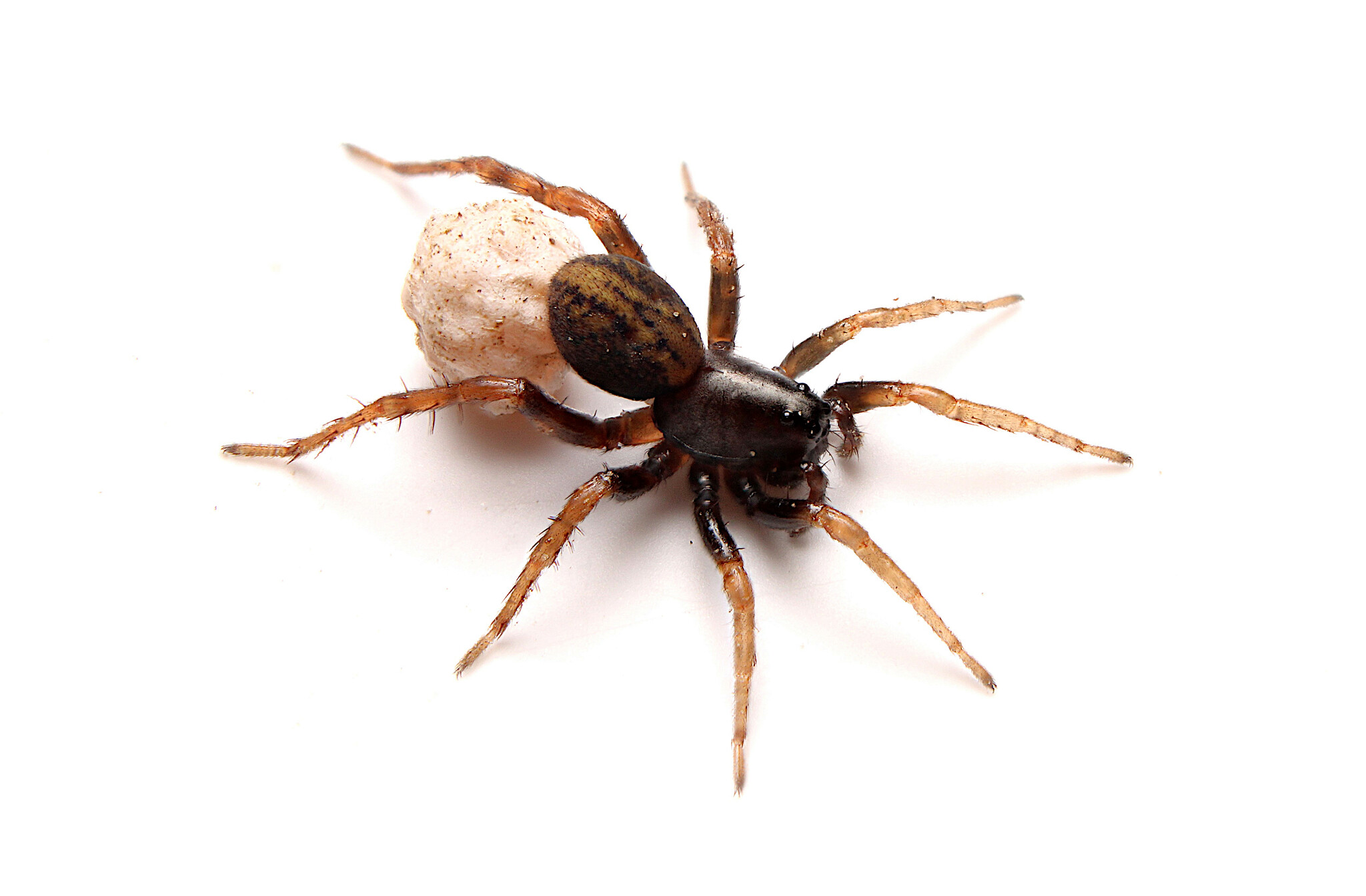
female A. funerea with egg sac

Species in this genus are free running ground dwellers.

== Taxonomy ==
The genus Allocosa was described by Nathan Banks in 1900 with the type species Allocosa funerea (Hentz, 1844). Roewer in 1959 and the World Spider Catalog list numerous species of this genus from Africa.

However, Dondale and Redner in 1983 revised the genus in North and Central America and found one of the important characters to be a bifid median apophysis of the male palp.

According to Russell-Smith, he has never observed this character in the thousands of African lycosids he has examined, including South African specimens, and is reasonably convinced that the genus is confined to the Americas.

The true placement of the African species assigned to Allocosa remains uncertain and would require re-examination of all the species assigned to the genus by Roewer.

== Species ==
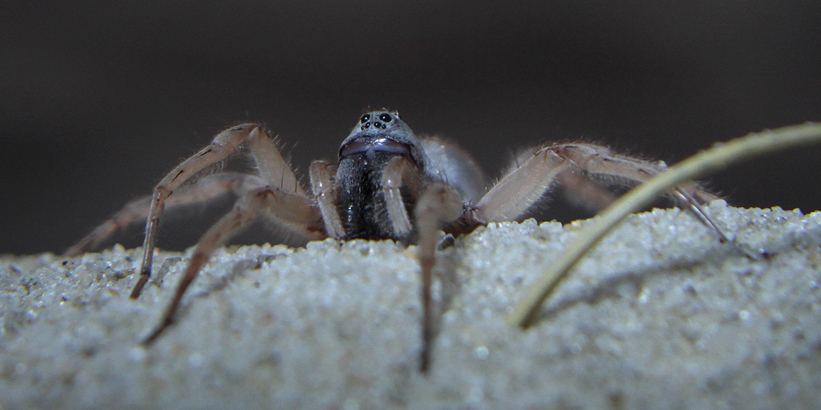
male A. brasiliensis

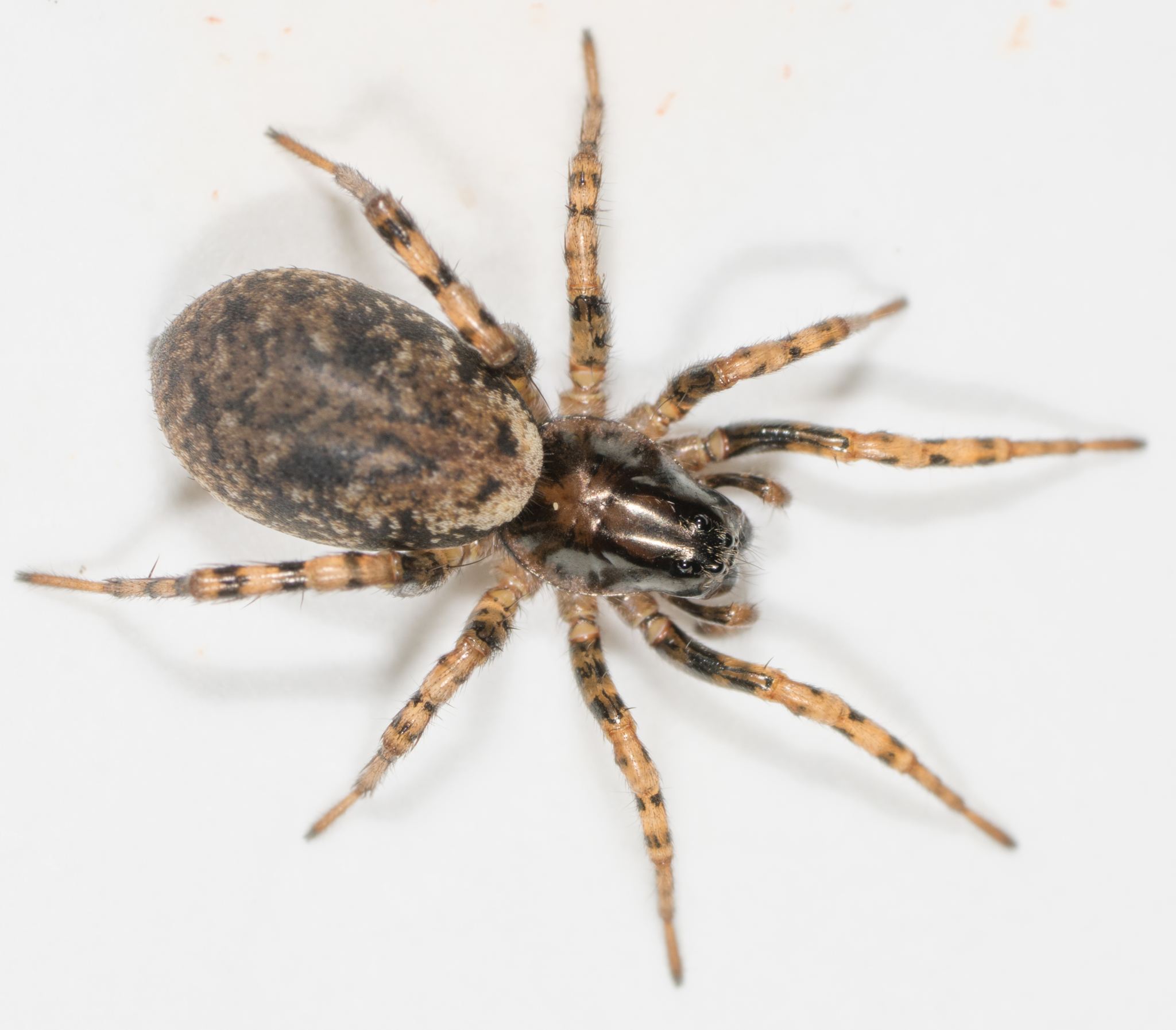
female A. subparva

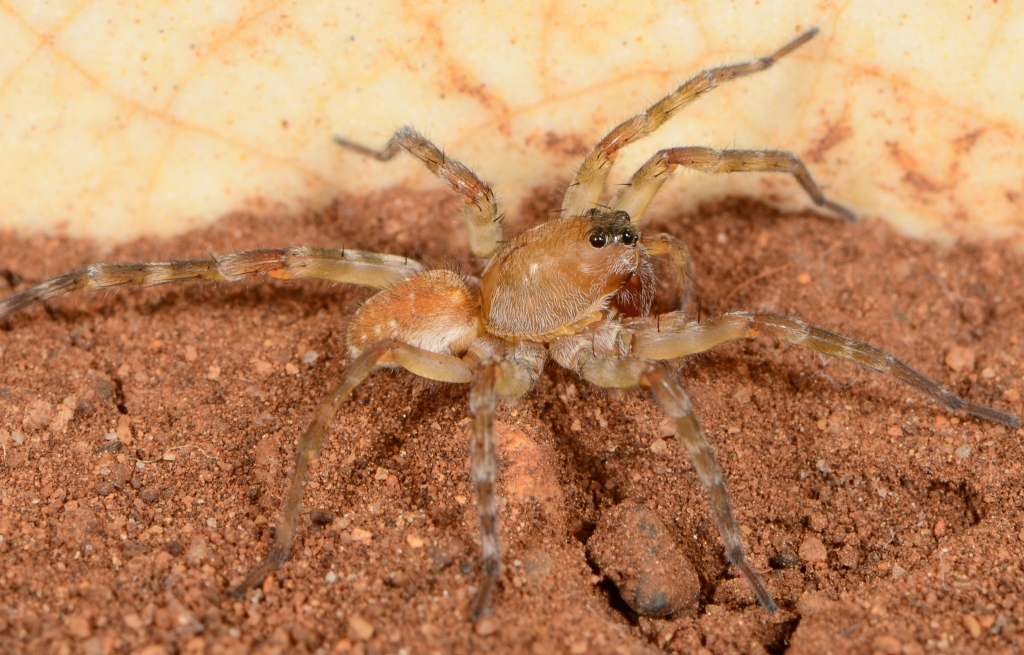
female A. testacea

As of October 2025, this genus includes 130 species.

These species have articles on Wikipedia:

- Allocosa algoensis (Pocock, 1900) – South Africa
- Allocosa aurata (Purcell, 1903) – South Africa
- Allocosa aurichelis Roewer, 1959 – South Africa
- Allocosa brasiliensis (Petrunkevitch, 1910) – Brazil
- Allocosa caboverdensis Schmidt & Krause, 1995 – Cape Verde
- Allocosa chamberlini (Gertsch, 1934) – United States
- Allocosa exserta Roewer, 1959 – Namibia, Botswana, South Africa
- Allocosa faberrima (Simon, 1910) – Namibia, Botswana, South Africa
- Allocosa funerea (Hentz, 1844) – United States (type species)
- Allocosa gracilitarsis (Purcell, 1903) – Namibia, South Africa
- Allocosa lawrencei (Roewer, 1951) – South Africa, Eswatini
- Allocosa montana Roewer, 1959 – Tanzania, Botswana, Zimbabwe, South Africa
- Allocosa nebulosa Roewer, 1959 – DR Congo, Namibia, South Africa
- Allocosa schoenlandi (Pocock, 1900) – South Africa
- Allocosa senex (Mello-Leitão, 1945) – Argentina, Brazil, Uruguay
- Allocosa sublata (Montgomery, 1902) – United States
- Allocosa subparva Dondale & Redner, 1983 – United States, Mexico
- Allocosa testacea Roewer, 1959 – South Africa
- Allocosa umtalica (Purcell, 1903) – Tanzania, Zimbabwe, South Africa, Eswatini

Complete species list as of October 2025
- Allocosa abmingani (Hickman, 1944) – Australia (South Australia)
- Allocosa absoluta (Gertsch, 1934) – United States, Mexico
- Allocosa adolphifriederici (Strand, 1913) – Central, East Africa, Zanzibar
- Allocosa albiconspersa Roewer, 1959 – Rwanda
- Allocosa algoensis (Pocock, 1900) – South Africa
- Allocosa alticeps (Mello-Leitão, 1944) – Argentina
- Allocosa apora (Gertsch, 1934) – USA to Costa Rica
- Allocosa aurata (Purcell, 1903) – South Africa
- Allocosa aurichelis Roewer, 1959 – South Africa
- Allocosa bersabae Roewer, 1959 – Namibia
- Allocosa biserialis Roewer, 1959 – DR Congo
- Allocosa brasiliensis (Petrunkevitch, 1910) – Brazil
- Allocosa caboverdensis Schmidt & Krause, 1995 – Cape Verde
- Allocosa calamarica (Strand, 1914) – Colombia
- Allocosa cambridgei (Simon, 1876) – Turkey, Syria
- Allocosa chamberlini (Gertsch, 1934) – United States
- Allocosa clariventris (Guy, 1966) – Morocco
- Allocosa comotti (Thorell, 1887) – Myanmar
- Allocosa danneili (Dahl, 1908) – Papua New Guinea (Bismarck Arch.)
- Allocosa delagoa Roewer, 1959 – Mozambique
- Allocosa delesserti (Caporiacco, 1941) – Ethiopia
- Allocosa deserticola (Simon, 1898) – Egypt
- Allocosa dingosaeformis (Guy, 1966) – Morocco
- Allocosa dubia (Walckenaer, 1837) – Brazil
- Allocosa edeala Roewer, 1959 – Cameroon
- Allocosa efficiens Roewer, 1959 – Congo, Rwanda
- Allocosa excusor (L. Koch, 1867) – Australia (Queensland)
- Allocosa exserta Roewer, 1959 – Namibia, Botswana, South Africa
- Allocosa faberrima (Simon, 1910) – Namibia, Botswana, South Africa
- Allocosa finkei (Hickman, 1944) – Australia (South Australia)
- Allocosa flavisternis (L. Koch, 1877) – Australia (Queensland, New South Wales)
- Allocosa floridiana (Chamberlin, 1908) – United States
- Allocosa funerea (Hentz, 1844) – United States (type species)
- Allocosa furtiva (Gertsch, 1934) – United States
- Allocosa gabesia Roewer, 1959 – Tunisia
- Allocosa glochidea Roewer, 1959 – Namibia
- Allocosa gorontalensis (Merian, 1911) – Indonesia (Sulawesi)
- Allocosa gracilitarsis (Purcell, 1903) – Namibia, South Africa
- Allocosa guianensis (Caporiacco, 1947) – Guyana
- Allocosa halei (Hickman, 1944) – Australia (Northern Territory)
- Allocosa handschini (Schenkel, 1937) – Morocco
- Allocosa hasselti (L. Koch, 1877) – Australia (Queensland, South Australia)
- Allocosa hirsuta (Bösenberg & Lenz, 1895) – Central, East Africa
- Allocosa hostilis (L. Koch, 1877) – Fiji
- Allocosa hugonis (Strand, 1911) – Indonesia (Aru Is.)
- Allocosa illegalis (Strand, 1906) – Ethiopia
- Allocosa ituriana (Strand, 1913) – Central Africa
- Allocosa iturianella Roewer, 1959 – Kenya, Uganda
- Allocosa kalaharensis (Simon, 1910) – Botswana, South Africa
- Allocosa karissimbica (Strand, 1913) – Central, East Africa
- Allocosa kazibana Roewer, 1959 – Congo, Rwanda, Tanzania
- Allocosa laetella (Strand, 1907) – Indonesia (Moluccas)
- Allocosa lawrencei (Roewer, 1951) – South Africa, Eswatini
- Allocosa leucotricha Roewer, 1959 – Congo
- Allocosa lombokensis (Strand, 1913) – Indonesia (Lombok)
- Allocosa mafensis (Lawrence, 1927) – Namibia
- Allocosa mahengea Roewer, 1959 – Tanzania
- Allocosa manmaka Roewer, 1960 – Afghanistan
- Allocosa marindia Simó, Lise, Pompozzi & Laborda, 2017 – Brazil, Uruguay
- Allocosa maroccana Roewer, 1959 – Morocco
- Allocosa marshalli (Pocock, 1901) – Zimbabwe
- Allocosa martinicensis (Strand, 1910) – Martinique
- Allocosa marua Roewer, 1959 – Cameroon
- Allocosa mascatensis (Simon, 1898) – Oman
- Allocosa mexicana (Banks, 1898) – Mexico
- Allocosa millica (Strand, 1906) – United States
- Allocosa mirabilis (Strand, 1906) – Ethiopia
- Allocosa mogadorensis (Simon, 1909) – Morocco
- Allocosa mokiensis Gertsch, 1934 – United States, Mexico
- Allocosa molicola (Strand, 1906) – Ethiopia
- Allocosa montana Roewer, 1959 – Tanzania, Botswana, Zimbabwe, South Africa
- Allocosa morelosiana (Gertsch & Davis, 1940) – United States, Mexico
- Allocosa mossambica Roewer, 1959 – Mozambique
- Allocosa mossamedesa Roewer, 1959 – Angola
- Allocosa mulaiki (Gertsch, 1934) – United States
- Allocosa mutilata Mello-Leitão, 1937 – Brazil
- Allocosa nanahuensis (Badcock, 1932) – Paraguay
- Allocosa nebulosa Roewer, 1959 – DR Congo, Namibia, South Africa
- Allocosa nigella (Caporiacco, 1940) – Ethiopia
- Allocosa nigripes (Guy, 1966) – Morocco
- Allocosa nigriventris (Guy, 1966) – Morocco
- Allocosa nigrofulva (Caporiacco, 1955) – Venezuela
- Allocosa noctuabunda (Montgomery, 1904) – United States, Mexico
- Allocosa obscuroides (Strand, 1906) – Indonesia (Java), Australia
- Allocosa obturata (Lawrence, 1928) – Namibia
- Allocosa olivieri (Simon, 1876) – Syria, Israel
- Allocosa orinus (Chamberlin, 1916) – Peru
- Allocosa otavia Roewer, 1959 – Namibia
- Allocosa palabunda (L. Koch, 1877) – Australia, New Caledonia
- Allocosa pallideflava (Lawrence, 1936) – Namibia
- Allocosa panamena Chamberlin, 1925 – Mexico to Ecuador
- Allocosa paraguayensis (Roewer, 1951) – Paraguay
- Allocosa pardala (Strand, 1909) – Brazil
- Allocosa parva (Banks, 1894) – USA to Costa Rica
- Allocosa parvivulva (Lawrence, 1927) – Namibia
- Allocosa pellita Roewer, 1960 – Afghanistan
- Allocosa perfecta Roewer, 1959 – Namibia
- Allocosa pistia (Strand, 1913) – Central, East Africa
- Allocosa plumipes Roewer, 1959 – Tanzania
- Allocosa pugnatrix (Keyserling, 1877) – Central America, Caribbean
- Allocosa pulchella Roewer, 1959 – Namibia
- Allocosa pylora Chamberlin, 1925 – United States
- Allocosa quadrativulva (Caporiacco, 1955) – Venezuela
- Allocosa retenta (Gertsch & Wallace, 1935) – United States
- Allocosa ruwenzorensis (Strand, 1913) – East Africa
- Allocosa samoana (Roewer, 1951) – Samoa
- Allocosa sangtoda Roewer, 1960 – Afghanistan
- Allocosa schoenlandi (Pocock, 1900) – South Africa
- Allocosa schubotzi (Strand, 1913) – Rwanda
- Allocosa sefrana (Schenkel, 1937) – Algeria
- Allocosa senex (Mello-Leitão, 1945) – Argentina, Brazil, Uruguay
- Allocosa sennaris Roewer, 1959 – Sudan
- Allocosa sjostedti (Lessert, 1926) – East Africa, Rwanda
- Allocosa soluta (Tullgren, 1905) – Bolivia
- Allocosa sublata (Montgomery, 1902) – United States
- Allocosa subparva Dondale & Redner, 1983 – United States, Mexico
- Allocosa tagax (Thorell, 1897) – Myanmar
- Allocosa tangana Roewer, 1959 – Tanzania
- Allocosa tarentulina (Audouin, 1826) – North Africa
- Allocosa tenebrosa (Thorell, 1897) – Myanmar
- Allocosa testacea Roewer, 1959 – South Africa
- Allocosa thieli (Dahl, 1908) – Papua New Guinea (Bismarck Arch.)
- Allocosa tremens (O. Pickard-Cambridge, 1876) – Tunisia, Libya, Egypt
- Allocosa tuberculipalpus (Caporiacco, 1940) – Ethiopia, Kenya, South Africa
- Allocosa umtalica (Purcell, 1903) – Tanzania, Zimbabwe, South Africa, Eswatini
- Allocosa utahana Dondale & Redner, 1983 – United States
- Allocosa venezuelica (Caporiacco, 1955) – Venezuela
- Allocosa veracruzana (Gertsch & Davis, 1940) – Mexico
- Allocosa wittei Roewer, 1959 – Congo
- Allocosa yurae (Strand, 1908) – Peru, Chile
