= Paroligolophus meadii =

Scientific classification
- Domain: Eukaryota
- Kingdom: Animalia
- Phylum: Arthropoda
- Subphylum: Chelicerata
- Class: Arachnida
- Order: Opiliones
- Family: Phalangiidae
- Genus: Paroligolophus
- Species: P. meadii

Binomial name
- Paroligolophus meadii (O.P.-Cambridge, 1890)

Species of harvestman/daddy longlegs

Paroligolophus meadii is a species of harvestman. It occurs in England. It is less common and significantly smaller than the related species Paroligolophus agrestis.
