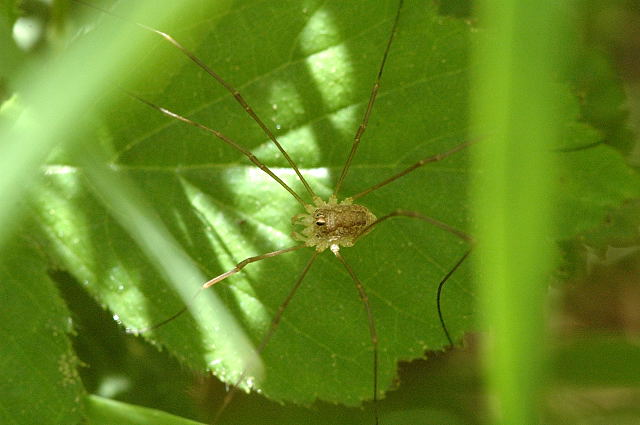
- Rilaena triangularis

Scientific classification
- Kingdom: Animalia
- Phylum: Arthropoda
- Subphylum: Chelicerata
- Class: Arachnida
- Order: Opiliones
- Family: Phalangiidae
- Subfamily: Phalangiinae
- Genus: Rilaena; Silhavý, 1965

Type species
- Rilaena balcanica Silhavý, 1965

Species
- See text

= Rilaena =

Genus of harvestmen

Rilaena is a genus of the harvestman family Phalangiidae.

Rilaena triangularis, the most common species, is sometimes considered to be in the genus Paraplatybunus, in the subfamily Platybuninae.

== Species ==
- Rilaena artvinensis Kurt 2015
- Rilaena atrolutea (Roewer, 1915) (Caucasus)
- Rilaena augusti Chemini, 1986 (Italy)
- Rilaena augustini Chemini, 1986 (Italy)
- Rilaena balcanica Silhavý, 1965
- Rilaena buresi Silhavy 1965
- Rilaena caucasica Snegovaya & Tchemeris 2016
- Rilaena gruberi Starega, 1973
- Rilaena hyrcanus (Thorell, 1876) (Iran)
- Rilaena silhavyi Snegovaya & Tchemeris 2016
- Rilaena serbica Karaman, 1992 (former Yugoslavia)
- Rilaena pusilla (Roewer, 1952)
- Rilaena spinosissimus Hadzi, 1973
- Rilaena triangularis (Herbst, 1799)
