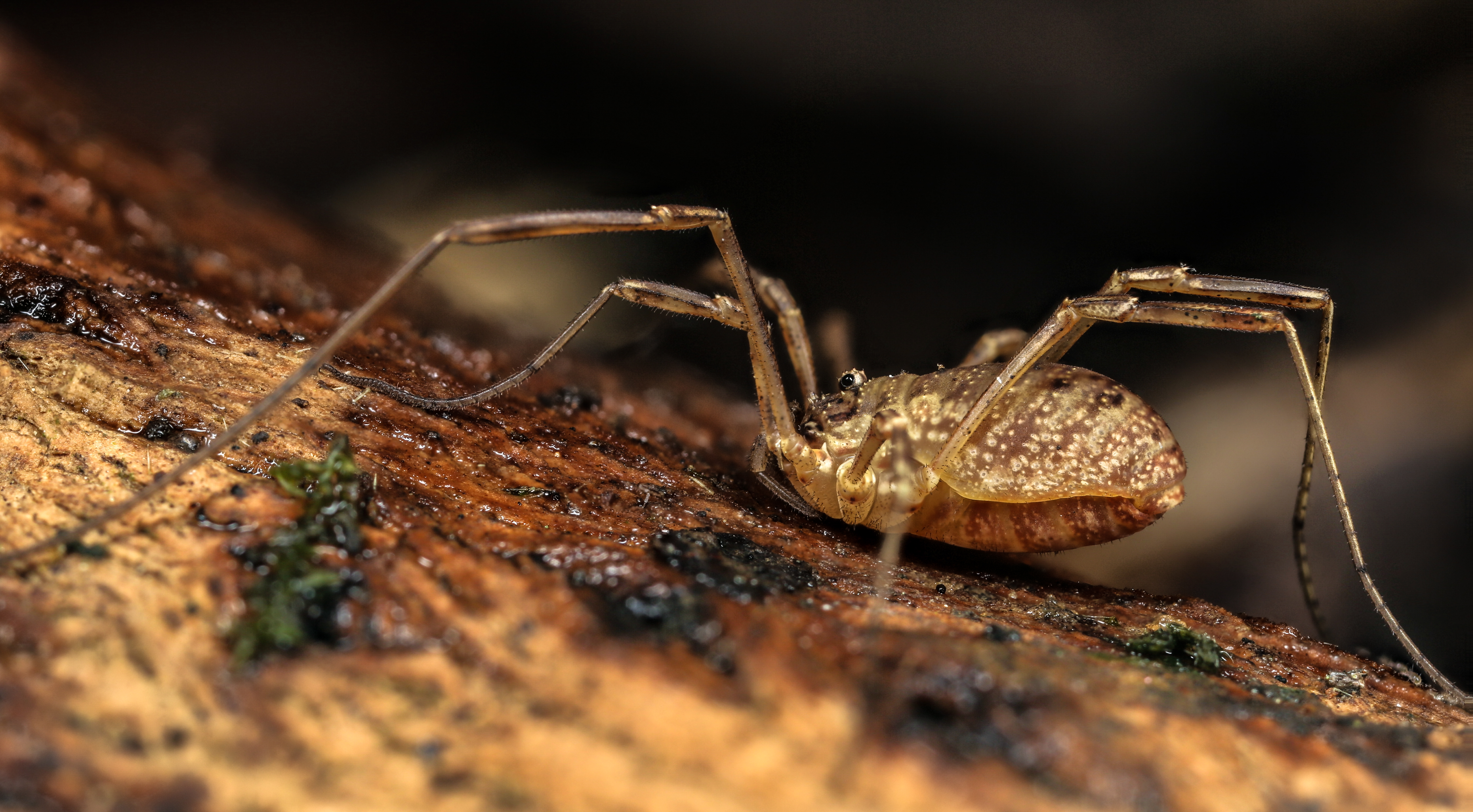

Scientific classification
- Domain: Eukaryota
- Kingdom: Animalia
- Phylum: Arthropoda
- Subphylum: Chelicerata
- Class: Arachnida
- Order: Opiliones
- Family: Phalangiidae
- Genus: Oligolophus
- Species: O. tridens

Binomial name
- Oligolophus tridens (C. L. Koch, 1836)

Synonyms
- Opilio tridens

= Oligolophus tridens =

Species of harvestman/daddy longlegs

Oligolophus tridens is a species of harvestman. It is found in central and western Europe. They typically mature in summer. They are predators, and can reduce aphid populations by up to 97%. They are known to disperse Melampyrum seeds.

== Sources ==
- Joel Hallan's Biology Catalog: Phalangiidae
