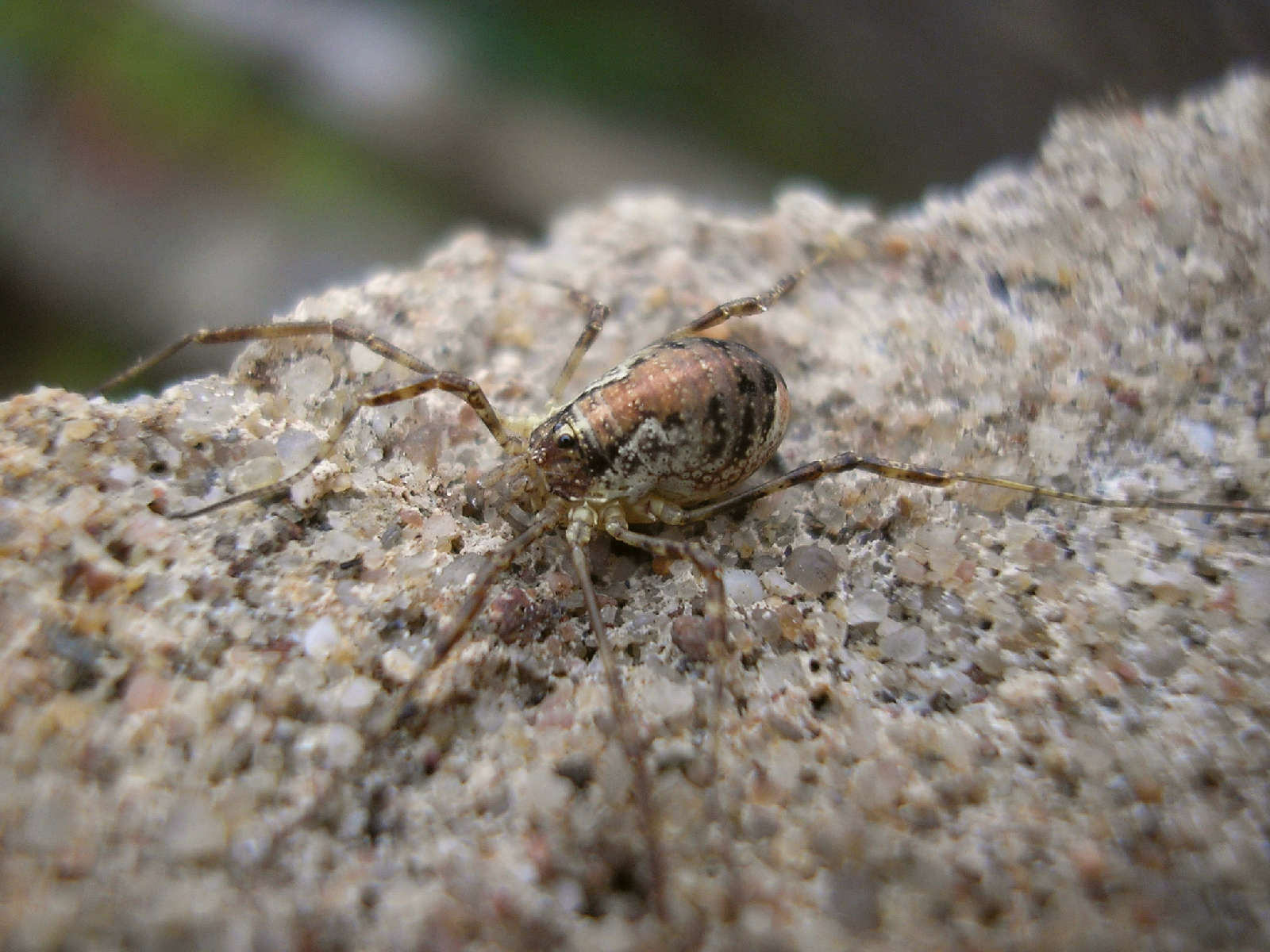
- P. agrestis

Scientific classification
- Domain: Eukaryota
- Kingdom: Animalia
- Phylum: Arthropoda
- Subphylum: Chelicerata
- Class: Arachnida
- Order: Opiliones
- Family: Phalangiidae
- Subfamily: Oligolophinae
- Genus: Paroligolophus; Lohmander, 1945

= Paroligolophus =

Genus of harvestman

Paroligolophus is a genus of harvestman; it was formerly included in the genus Oligolophus. Two species recorded in the United Kingdom are:

- Paroligolophus agrestis
- Paroligolophus meadii
