= Leptobunus californicus =

Scientific classification
- Domain: Eukaryota
- Kingdom: Animalia
- Phylum: Arthropoda
- Subphylum: Chelicerata
- Class: Arachnida
- Order: Opiliones
- Family: Phalangiidae
- Genus: Leptobunus
- Species: L. californicus

Binomial name
- Leptobunus californicus Banks, 1893

Species of harvestman/daddy longlegs

Leptobunus californicus is a species of harvestman in the family Phalangiidae. It is found in North America.
