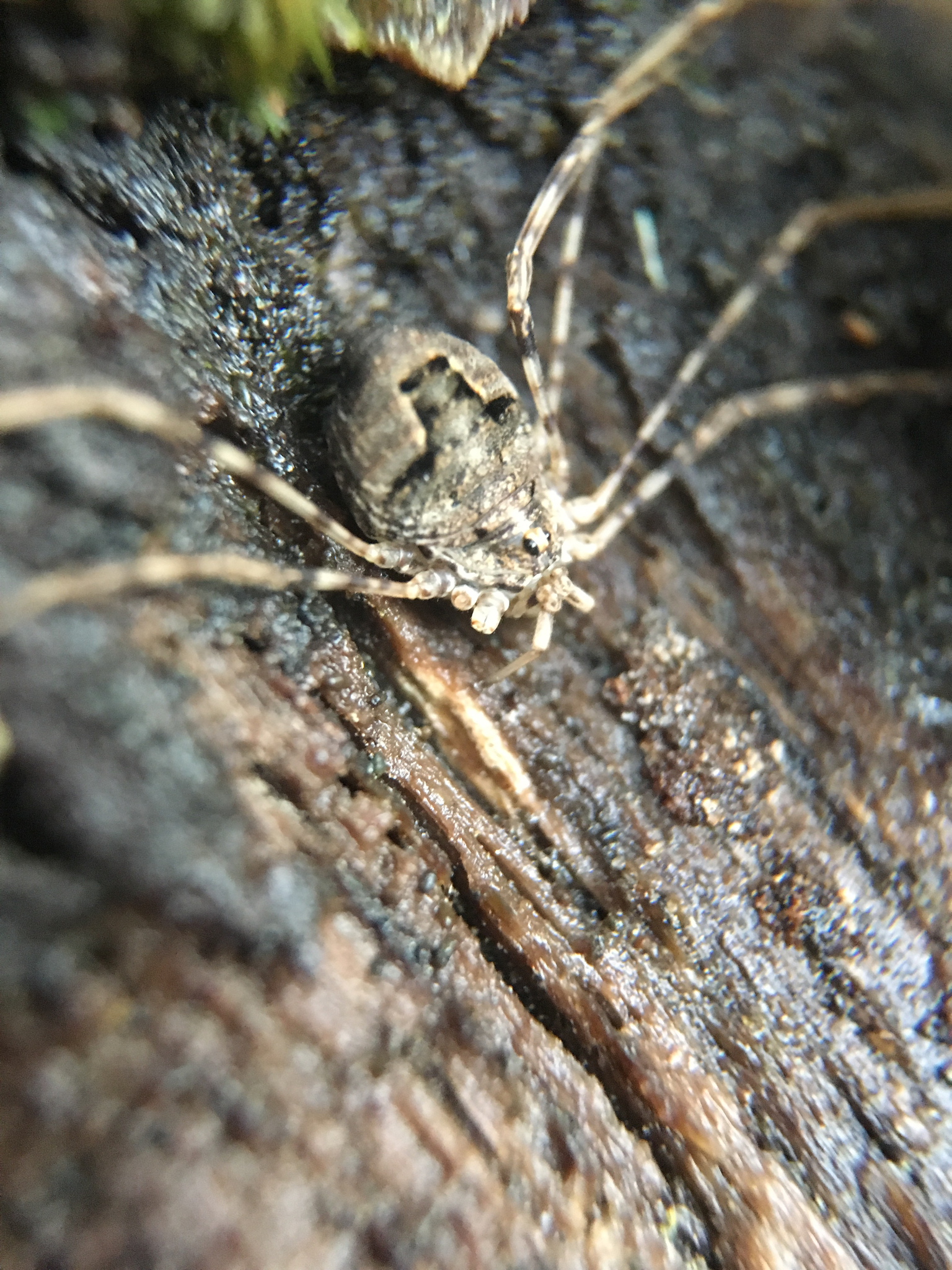

Scientific classification
- Kingdom: Animalia
- Phylum: Arthropoda
- Subphylum: Chelicerata
- Class: Arachnida
- Order: Opiliones
- Family: Phalangiidae
- Genus: Leptobunus
- Species: L. aureus

Binomial name
- Leptobunus aureus J.C. Cokendolpher, 1984

= Leptobunus aureus =

Species of harvestman/daddy longlegs

Leptobunus aureus is a species of harvestman in the family Phalangiidae. It is found in North America.
