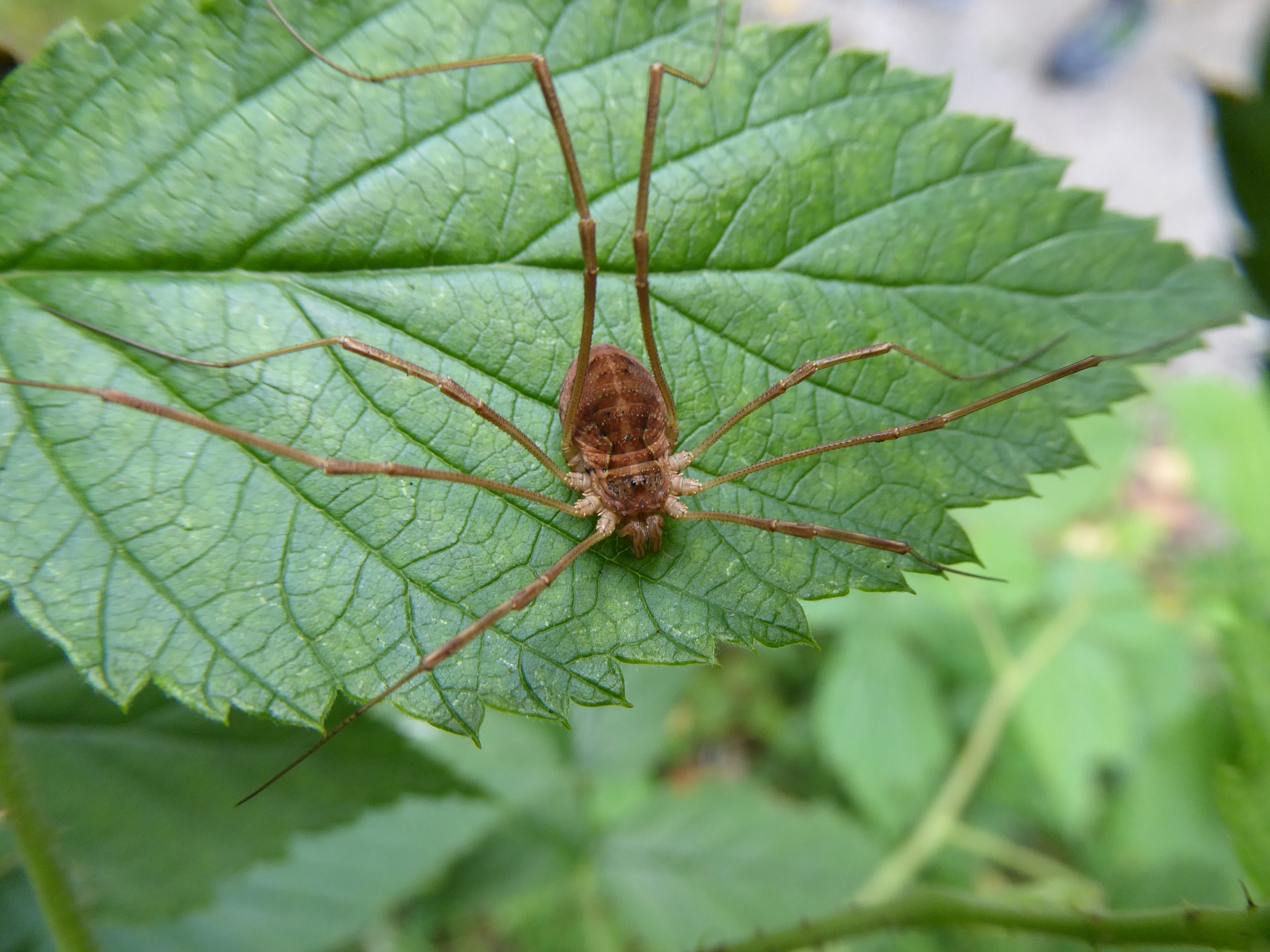
- Mitopus morio

Scientific classification
- Kingdom: Animalia
- Phylum: Arthropoda
- Subphylum: Chelicerata
- Class: Arachnida
- Order: Opiliones
- Family: Phalangiidae
- Genus: Mitopus
- Species: M. morio

Binomial name
- Mitopus morio (Fabricius, 1779)

Synonyms
- List: Mitopus boreali s (Thorell, 1876); Mitopus californicus Banks, 1901; Mitopus montanus Banks, 1901; Mitopus scaber Roewer, 1912; Oligolophus kulczynskii Strand, 1900; Oligolophus vagans Strand, 1900; Opilio affinis Koch, 1848; Opilio albescens Koch, 1848; Opilio albipes Doleschall, 1852; Opilio alpinus Herbst, 1799; Opilio canescens Koch, 1839; Opilio cinerascens Koch, 1839; Opilio cinerascens Koch, 1848; Opilio crypturum Koch, 1836; Opilio fasciatus Koch, 1835; Opilio grossipes Herbst, 1799; Opilio inermis Doleschall, 1852; Opilio petrensis Koch, 1861; Opilio rhododendri Koch, 1869; Opilio rufescens Koch, 1848; Opilio serripes Koch, 1848; Opilio similis Koch, 1848; Phalangium morio Fabricius, 1779; Phalangium palliatum Latreille, 1798; Phalangium urnigerum Hammer, 1804

= Mitopus morio =

Species of harvestman/daddy longlegs

Mitopus morio is a species of harvestman arachnid belonging to the family Phalangiidae.

== Distribution ==
This species occurs in Europe, North Africa, Asia and in North America.

== Habitat ==
This very common species inhabits different biotopes, forests, heath and moorland, spruce forests, beech forests. meadows, human settlements and gardens, from the lowlands to the mountains.

== Description ==
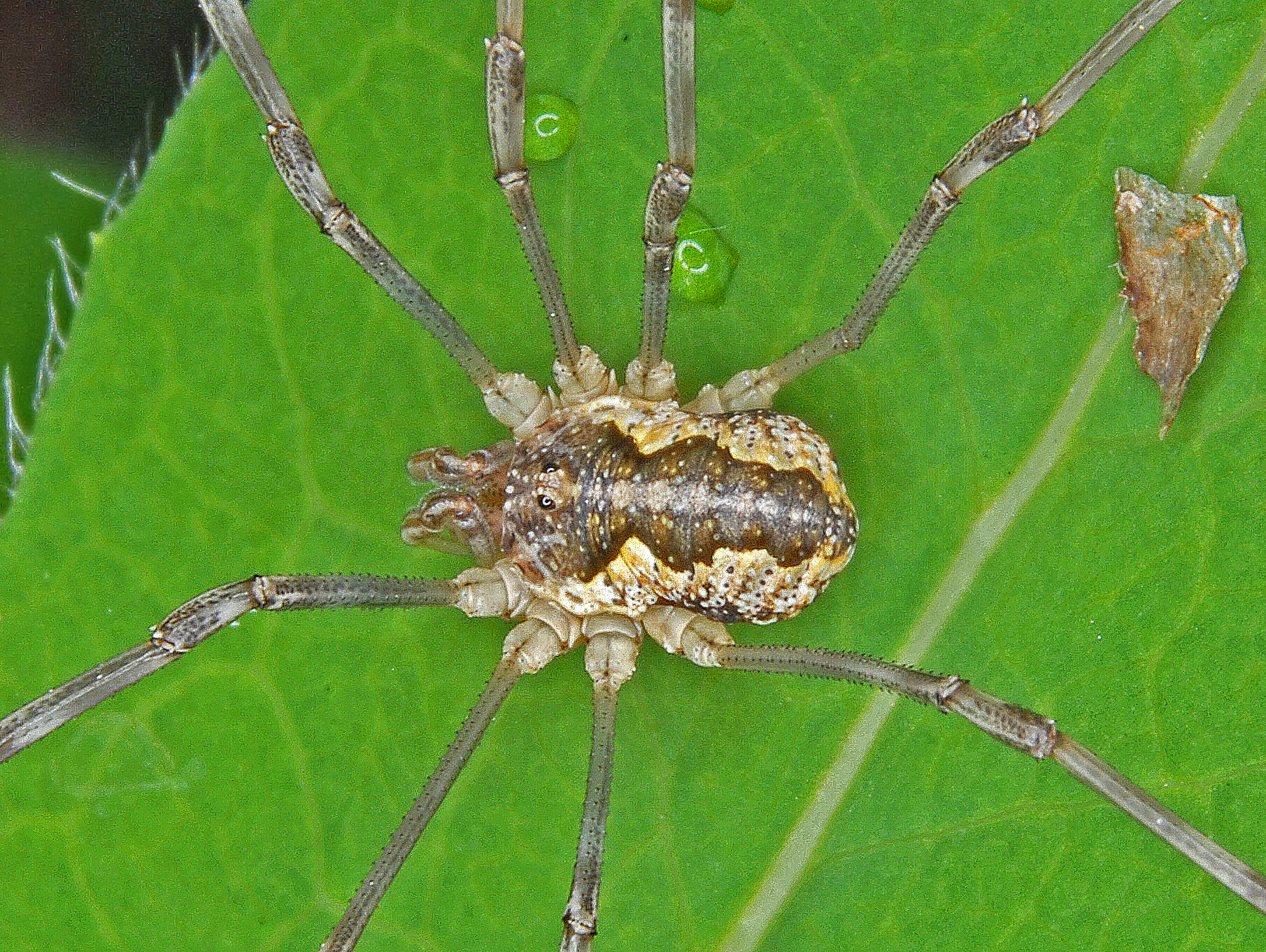
Close-up on the body

Mitopus morio can reach a body length of about 4–6 millimetres (0.16–0.24 in) in males, of about 4–8.5 millimetres (0.16–0.33 in) in females. However the body size is quite variable. The body is ovate, slightly narrower in the male. The head shows various tiny bumps. The eyes are small and narrow, longer than wider, with a varying number of small spikes around the eyebrow. Also color is rather variable, but males are usually brown-colored, where as females are darker. A dark irregular saddle-like area is always present on the back, sometimes with narrow white edges and a longitudinal pinkish stripe in the centre. The legs varies from yellowish-brown to dark brown and are thin and long. The length of the longest of the second pair of legs is 30–40 mm. Males have sharp, forward-pointing tooth under first segment of chelicera.

This species is rather similar and may be confused with the females of Phalangium opilio.

== Biology ==
Adults can be found from the middle of May until the middle of November, depending on the location. Eggs hatch at the end of March. These harvestmen feed on small insects and other small arthropods. Mitopus morio has been observed to walk using its first, third, and fourth sets of legs, using the unusually long second pair of legs to feel in front of it and probe its environment.

== Bibliography ==
- Cawley, M.. 2002, A review of the Irish harvestmen (Arachnida: Opiliones), Bulletin Irish biogeographical Society, 26: 106-137
- Edgar, A. L., 1990. Opiliones (Phalangida). pp. 529–581 in: D. L. Dindal, ed., Soil Biology Guide. John Wiley & Sons, New York, : i-xx, 1–1349.
- Sankey, J.H.P & Savory, T.H. 1974, British Harvestmen. Arachnida : Opiliones, Synopses of the British Fauna, 4: 1-76
