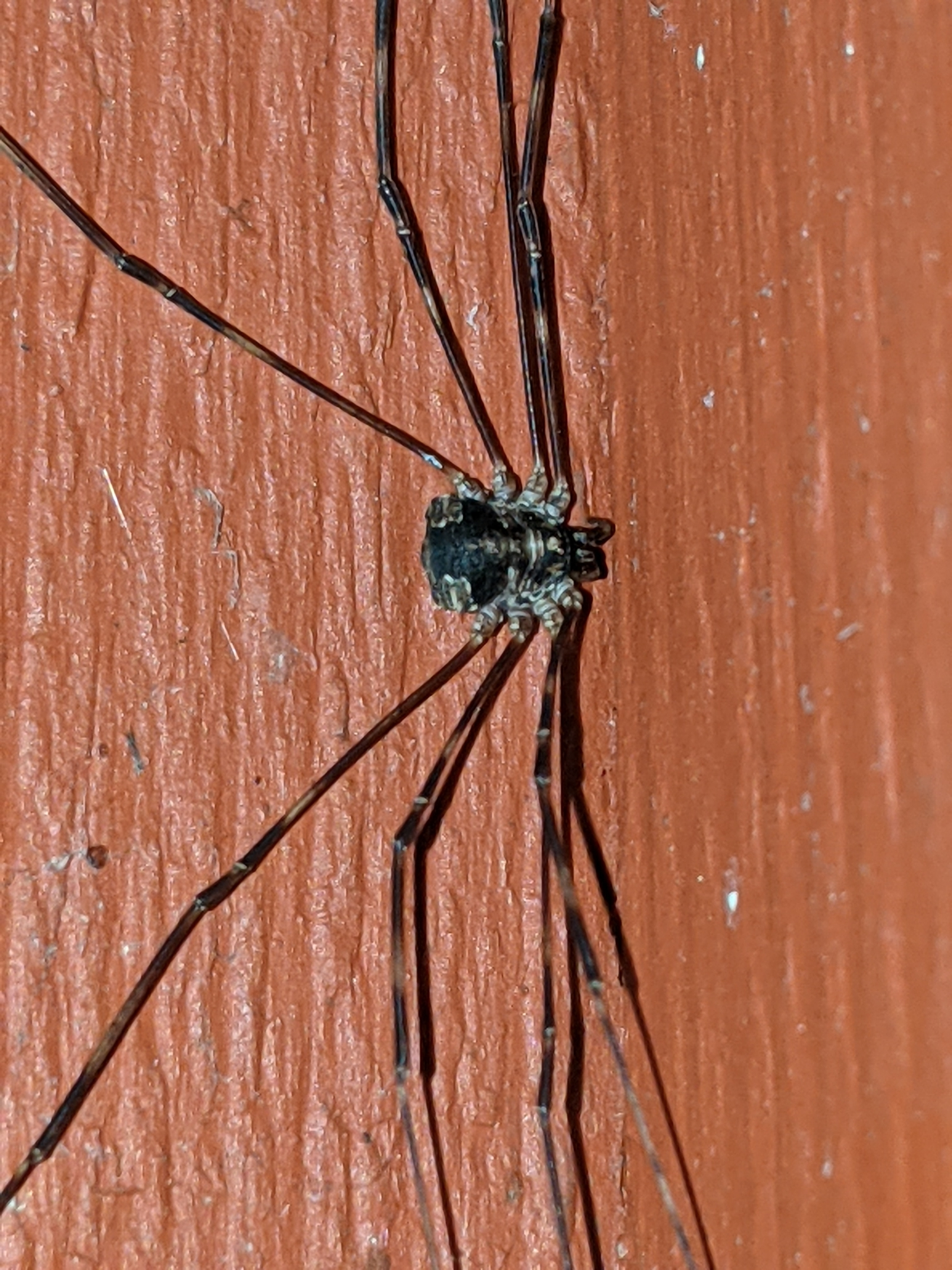

Scientific classification
- Domain: Eukaryota
- Kingdom: Animalia
- Phylum: Arthropoda
- Subphylum: Chelicerata
- Class: Arachnida
- Order: Opiliones
- Family: Phalangiidae
- Genus: Leptobunus
- Species: L. parvulus

Binomial name
- Leptobunus parvulus (Banks, 1894)

= Leptobunus parvulus =

Species of harvestman/daddy longlegs

Leptobunus parvulus is a species of harvestman in the family Phalangiidae. It is found in North America.
