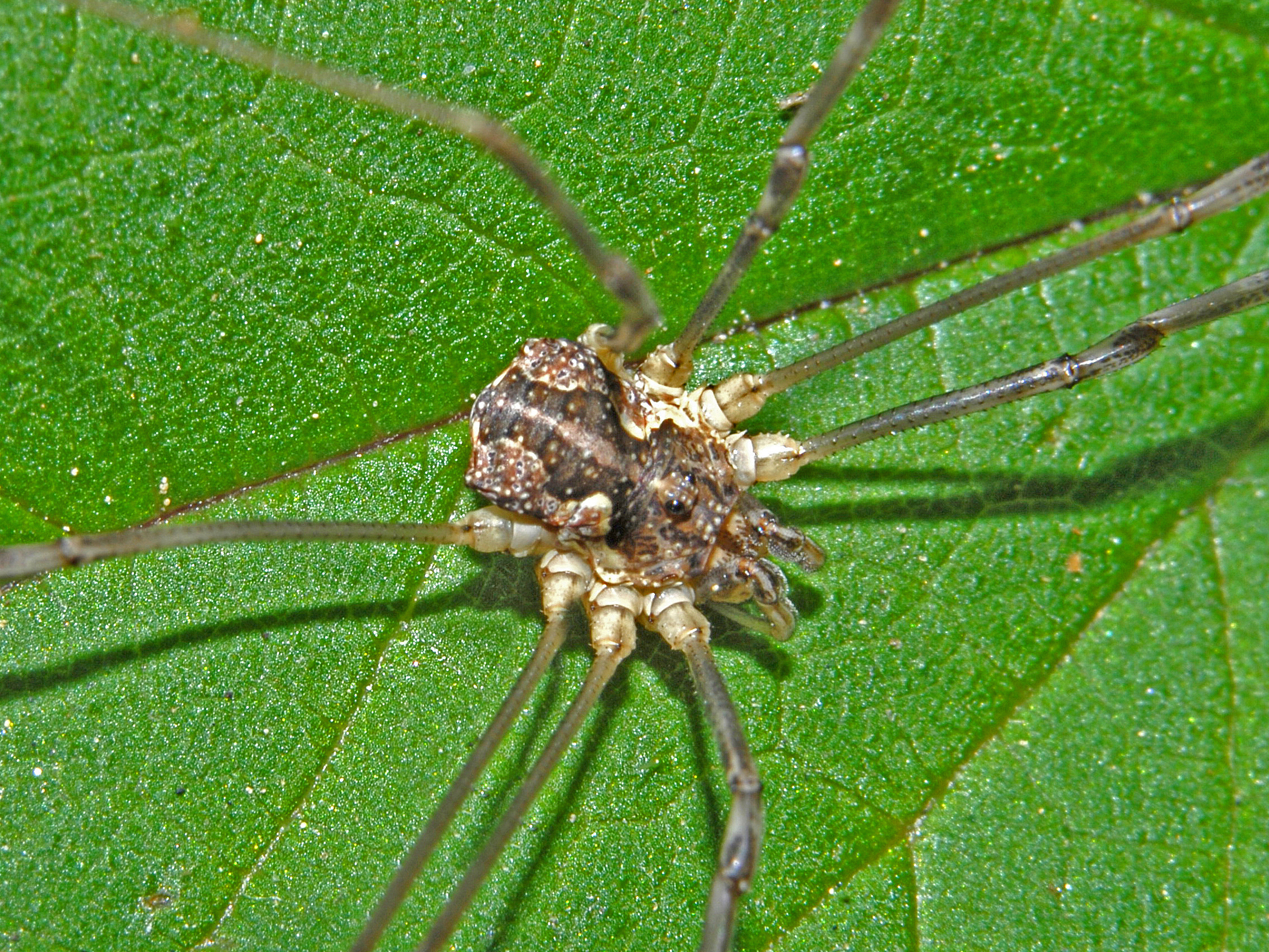
- Male

Scientific classification
- Domain: Eukaryota
- Kingdom: Animalia
- Phylum: Arthropoda
- Subphylum: Chelicerata
- Class: Arachnida
- Order: Opiliones
- Family: Phalangiidae
- Genus: Dasylobus
- Species: D. argentatus

Binomial name
- Dasylobus argentatus Canestrini, 1871

Synonyms
- Opilio argentatus Canestrini, 1879

= Dasylobus argentatus =

Species of harvestman/daddy longlegs

Dasylobus argentatus is a species of harvestman in the family Phalangiidae.

== Subspecies ==
Subspecies include:

- Dasylobus argentatus argentatus (Canestrini, 1871)
- Dasylobus argentatus cavipalpis Gruber, 1965

== Distribution ==
This species is present in France and in Italy.

== Description ==
Dasylobus argentatus can reach a body length of about 6–7 millimetres (0.24–0.28 in). Females are larger than males. These harvestmen show an irregular reddish brown or dark brown saddle on the median back of the body, usually with a median lighter broad band and whitish edges. Pedipalp's claw is small or absent, the tarsal claw of the pedipalp is present, the patellar apophysis is short or absent, the tarsal claw is rather smooth and the longest legs are II. Males can be distinguished on the basis of the chelicerae and the hairy, concave and enlarged patellae.

== Bibliography ==
- Canestrini, G. (1871): Nuove specie di Opilionidi Italiani. - Bollettino della Società Entomologica Italiana, Firenze, 3(4), 381–385.
- Minelli, A., Ruffo, S. & La Posta, S. (Eds.): Checklist delle specie della fauna italiana, 21: 8 S. - Calderini, Bologna.
- Gruber, J. (1965): Ein Beitrag zur Kenntnis der Weberknechte Italiens, insbesondere Calabriens (Opiliones, Arachnida). - Memorie del Museo Civico di Storia Naturale di Verona, 12 [1964], 291–308.
