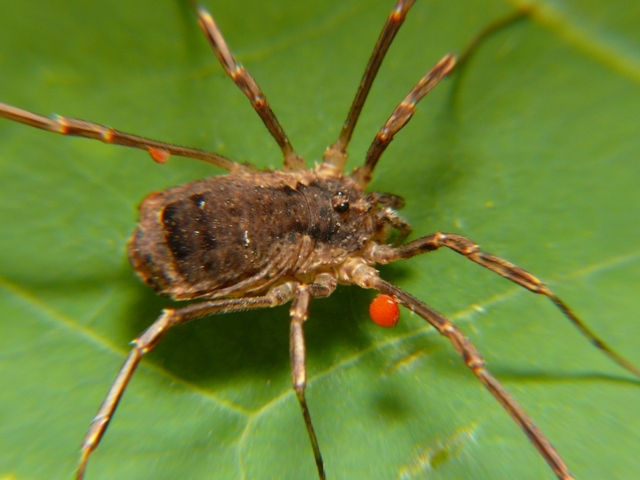

Scientific classification
- Kingdom: Animalia
- Phylum: Arthropoda
- Subphylum: Chelicerata
- Class: Arachnida
- Order: Opiliones
- Family: Phalangiidae
- Genus: Lacinius
- Species: L. ephippiatus

Binomial name
- Lacinius ephippiatus (Koch, 1835)

= Lacinius ephippiatus =

Species of harvestman/daddy longlegs

Lacinius ephippiatus is a species of arachnid belonging to the family Phalangiidae.

It is native to Europe.
