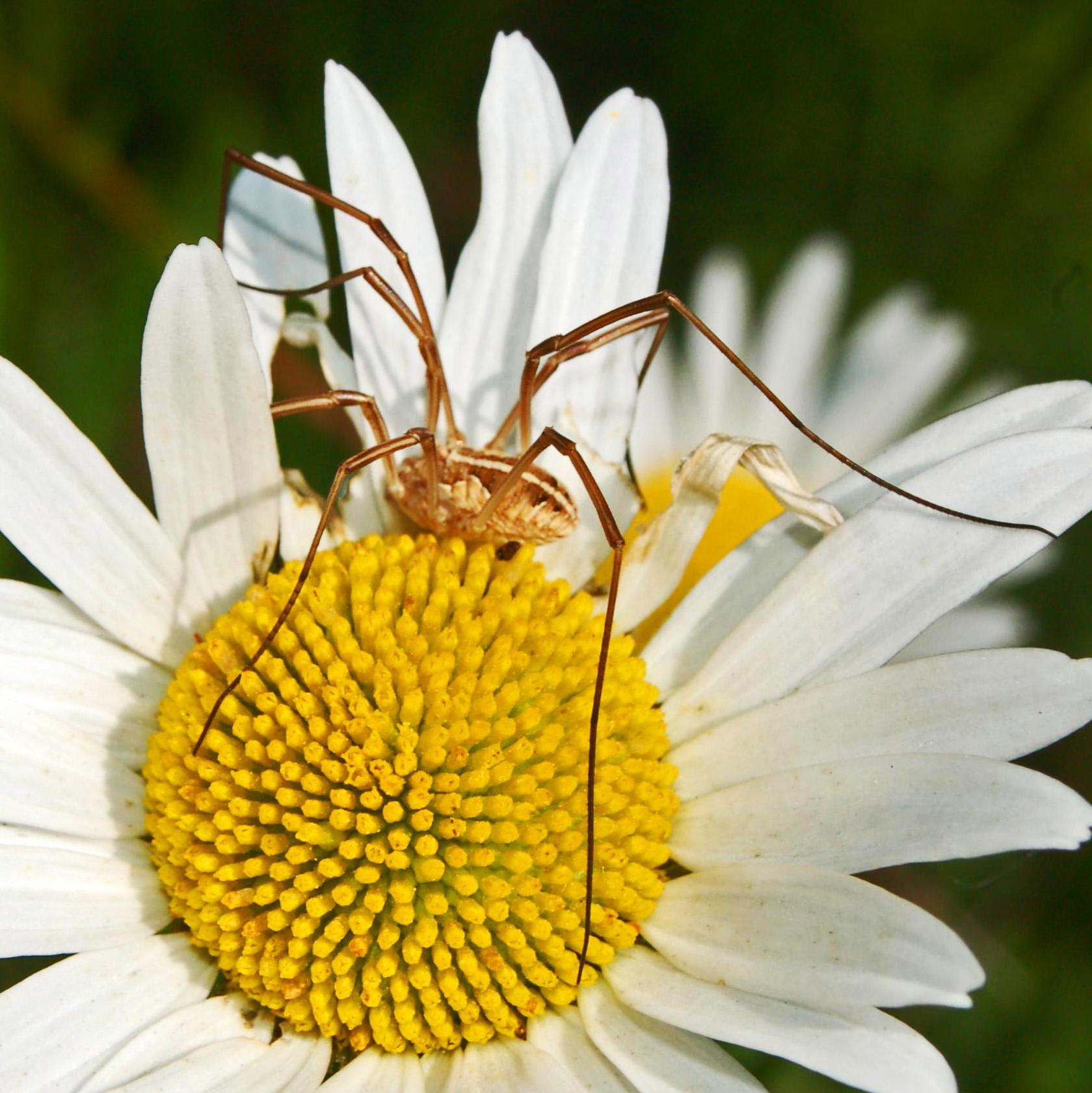
- Metaphalangium cirtanum

Scientific classification
- Kingdom: Animalia
- Phylum: Arthropoda
- Subphylum: Chelicerata
- Class: Arachnida
- Order: Opiliones
- Family: Phalangiidae
- Genus: Metaphalangium
- Species: M. cirtanum

Binomial name
- Metaphalangium cirtanum (C.L. Koch, 1839)

Synonyms
- Lacinius armatus Roewer, 1923; Metaphalangium propinquum (Lucas, 1847); Odontosoma armatum (Roewer, 1923); Opilio cirtanus C.L. Koch, 1839; Phalangium propinquum Lucas, 1846; Odontosoma armatus (Roewer, 1923)

= Metaphalangium cirtanum =

Species of harvestman/daddy longlegs

Metaphalangium cirtanum is a species of harvestman belonging to the family Phalangiidae.

== Distribution ==
This species has a circum-Mediterranean distribution. It is present in Albania, Algeria, Cyprus, Egypt, Greece, Italy, Lebanon, Libya, Montenegro, Morocco, Serbia, Spain and Tunisia.

== Habitat ==
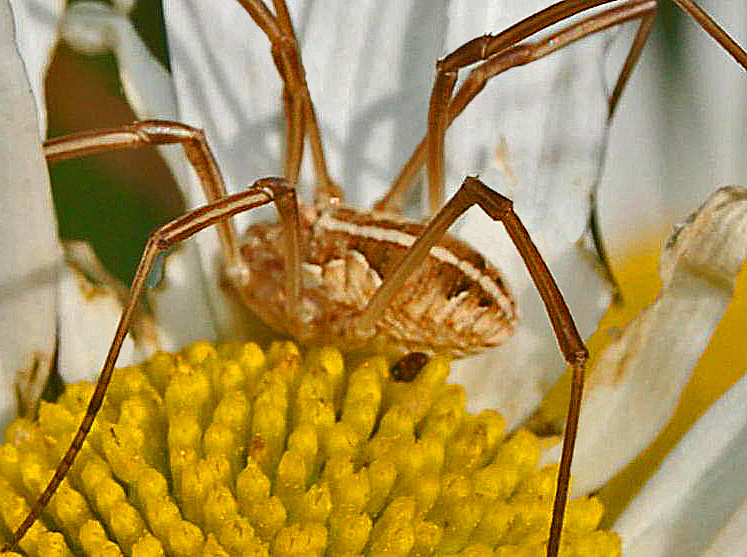
Body detail

This species mainly inhabits sunny wasteland and rocky grassland.

== Description ==
Metaphalangium cirtanum can reach approximately a body length of 4.5–9 millimetres (0.18–0.35 in) in both sexes. These quite common harvestmen present some degree of polymorphism. The basic coloration is reddish brown. They usually show a dark brown saddle-shaped marking broadened angularly in the middle of the abdomen. The saddle-shaped marking is partially outlined in white. A white longitudinal band runs from eye-mound to anus. Cephalothorax is denticulate anterior to the eyes, tergites have transversal rows of denticles. On the front body there is a small black thorns. Pedipalps are rather strong and short. Legs are long and strong and femur usually has strong denticles. Chelicerae of males are usually more developed than those of females. Furthermore, in males legs I (from femur to tibia) are greatly thickened.

== Biology ==
Adults can be found from June to August. It is not dangerous to humans nor pets. Like all harvestmen, it has no venom glands and no fangs. At most, if handled roughly, harvestmen can release a smelly defensive secretion, which might be mildly irritating but not dangerous.

== Bibliography ==
- Canestrini, G. (1875a) Intorno ai Chernetidi ed Opilionidi della Calabria. Atti della Accademia Scientifica Veneto-Trentino-Istriana, 4, 1–12.
- Koch, C.L. (1841) Arachniden und Myriapoden aus der Regentschaft Algier. In: Wagner, M. (Ed.), Reisen in der Regentschaft Algier, in den Jahren 1836, 1837 und 1838. Mit einem naturhistorischen Anhang und einem Kupferatlas. Vol. 3. Leopold Voss, Leipzig, pp. 211–225.
- Koch, C.L. (1847b) Die Arachniden getreu nach der Natur abgebildet und beschrieben. Vol 16. J.L. Lotzbeck, Nürnberg, 80 pp. + pl. DXLi-DXLiii.
- Lépiney, J. de (1940) Solifuges et Opilionides du Maroc déterminés par le Dr. C.F. Roewer. Bulletin de la Société des Sciences Naturelles du Maroc, 19(2) [“1939”], 116–118.
- Roewer, C.F. (1923) Die Weberknechte der Erde. Systematische Bearbeitung der bisher bekannten Opiliones. Gustav Fischer, Jena, 1116 pp.
- Roewer, C.F. (1924d) Opilioniden von der Insel Rhodos, Italien und Sardinien, sowie der Cyrenaica. Bollettino dei Musei di Zoologia e di Anatomia Comparata della R[egia]. Università di Torino, 39(19), 1–7.
- Roewer, C.F. (1956b) Über Phalangiinae (Phalangiidae, Opiliones Palpatores). (Weitere Weberknechte XIX). Senckenbergiana Biologica, 37(3/4), 247–318, plates 36–43.
- Sauer F. & J. Wunderlich (1997): Die schönsten Spinnen Europas nach Farbfotos erkannt. Fauna-Verlag. 5. Auflage. ISBN 3-923010-03-6, 296 S.
- Schenkel, E. (1938b) Spinnentiere von der iberischen Halbinsel, gesammelt von Prof. Dr. O. Lundblad, 1935. Arkiv för Zoologi, (4A) 30(24), 1–29.
- Schenkel, E. (1947) Einige Mitteilungen über Spinnentiere. Revue suisse de Zoologie, 54, 1–16.
- Šilhavý, V. (1974e) Několík sekáčů z Jugoslávie a Mongolska (Arach., Opiliones) (Ze sbírek entomologického oddělení Moravského muzea) [Some harvestmen from Yugoslavia and Mongolia (Arach., Opiliones) (From the collections of the entomological department of the Moravian Museum)]. Zprávy Československé společnosti entomologické při ČSAV, 10, 75–76.
- Simon, E. (1885c) Étude sur les Arachnides recueillis en Tunisie en 1883 et 1884 par MM. A. Letourneux, M. Sédillot et Valery Mayet, membres de la Mission de l'Exploration scientifique de la Tunisie. In: Exploration Scientifique de la Tunisie. 8 vo. pp. i.-iv. & 1–59. Imprimerie Nationale, Paris.
- Staręga, W. (1973a) Beitrag zur Kenntnis der Weberknechte (Opiliones) des Nahen Ostens. Annales Zoologici [Polska Akademia Nauk], Warsawa, 30(6), 129–153.
- Staręga, W. (1984) Revision der Phalangiidae (Opiliones), III. Die afrikanischen Gattungen der Phalangiinae, nebst Katalog aller afrikanischen Arten der Familie. Annales Zoologici (Polska Akademia Nauk), 38(1), 1–79.
