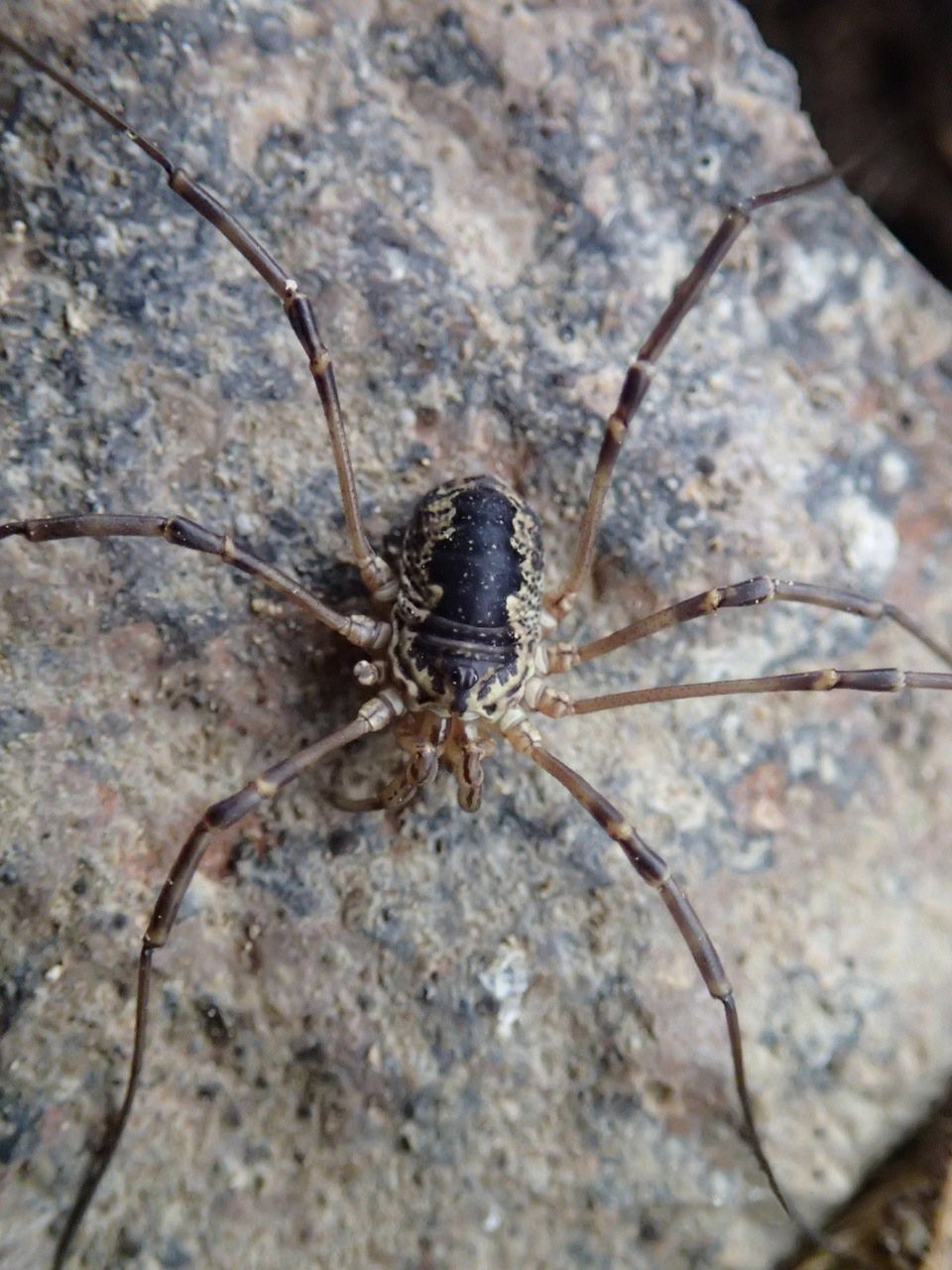

Scientific classification
- Domain: Eukaryota
- Kingdom: Animalia
- Phylum: Arthropoda
- Subphylum: Chelicerata
- Class: Arachnida
- Order: Opiliones
- Family: Phalangiidae
- Genus: Leptobunus
- Species: L. borealis

Binomial name
- Leptobunus borealis Banks, 1899

= Leptobunus borealis =

Species of harvestman/daddy longlegs

Leptobunus borealis is a species of harvestman in the family Phalangiidae. It is found in Europe and Northern Asia (excluding China) and North America.

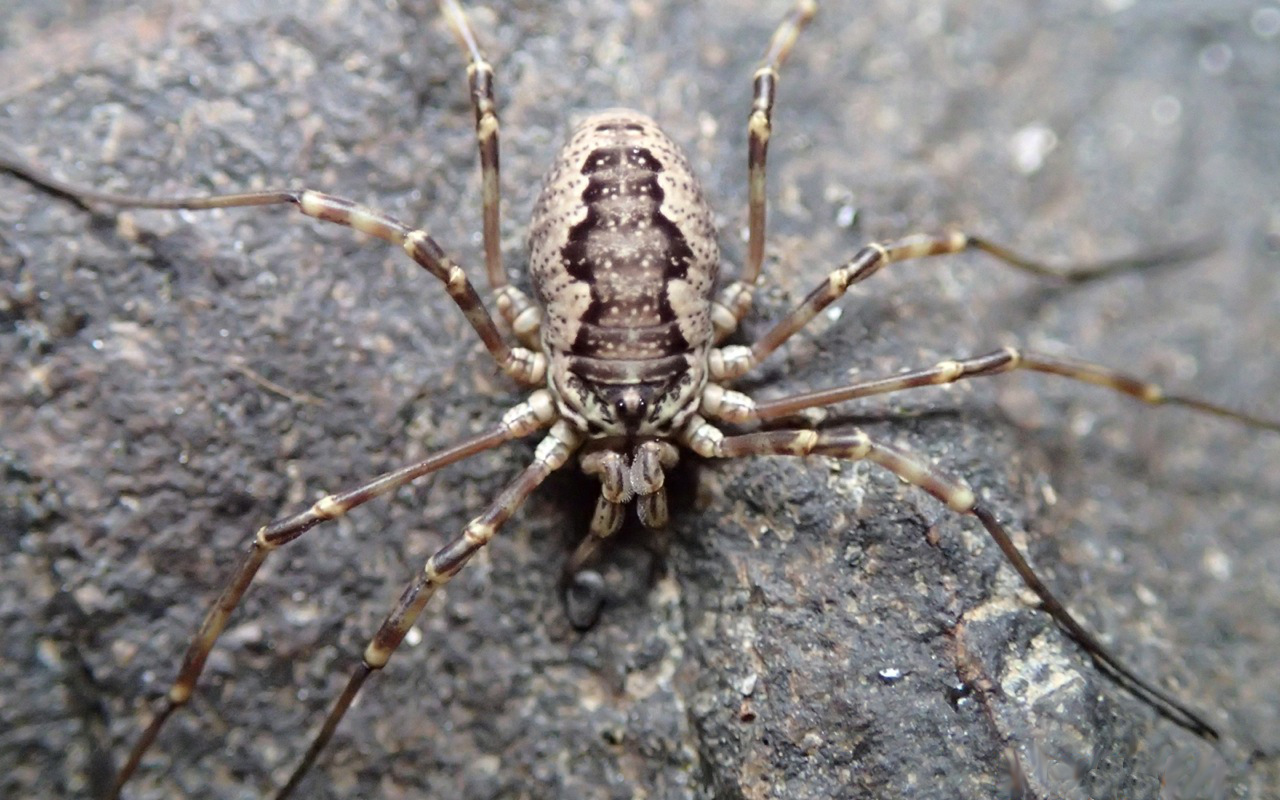
