= Scleropilio =

Scientific classification
- Domain: Eukaryota
- Kingdom: Animalia
- Phylum: Arthropoda
- Subphylum: Chelicerata
- Class: Arachnida
- Order: Opiliones
- Family: Phalangiidae
- Genus: Scleropilio; Roewer, 1911
- Species: S. insolens

Binomial name
- Scleropilio insolens (Simon, 1895)

Genus of harvestmen/daddy longlegs

Scleropilio insolens is a species of harvestmen in a monotypic genus in the family Phalangiidae.
