= Parascleropilio =

Scientific classification
- Domain: Eukaryota
- Kingdom: Animalia
- Phylum: Arthropoda
- Subphylum: Chelicerata
- Class: Arachnida
- Order: Opiliones
- Family: Phalangiidae
- Genus: Parascleropilio; Rambla, 1975
- Species: P. fernandezi

Binomial name
- Parascleropilio fernandezi Rambla, 1975

Genus of harvestmen/daddy longlegs

Parascleropilio fernandezi is a species of harvestmen in a monotypic genus in the family Phalangiidae.
