= Guruia =

Scientific classification
- Domain: Eukaryota
- Kingdom: Animalia
- Phylum: Arthropoda
- Subphylum: Chelicerata
- Class: Arachnida
- Order: Opiliones
- Family: Phalangiidae
- Genus: Guruia; Loman, 1902

Species
- Guruia africana (Karsch, 1878); Guruia longipes Roewer, 1911; Guruia quadrispina Roewer, 1911; Guruia talboti Roewer, 1911; Guruia ultima Caporiacco, 1949

Genus of harvestmen/daddy longlegs

Guruia is a genus of harvestmen in the family Phalangiidae.
