= Metadasylobus =

Scientific classification
- Domain: Eukaryota
- Kingdom: Animalia
- Phylum: Arthropoda
- Subphylum: Chelicerata
- Class: Arachnida
- Order: Opiliones
- Family: Phalangiidae
- Genus: Metadasylobus; Roewer, 1911

Genus of harvestmen/daddy longlegs

Metadasylobus is a genus of harvestmen in the family Phalangiidae.

== Species ==
- Metadasylobus bolei Hadzi, 1973
- Metadasylobus echinifrons (Simon, 1879)
- Metadasylobus fuscoannulatus (Simon, 1883)
- Metadasylobus ibericus (Rambla, 1968)
- Metadasylobus instratus (L.Koch, 1867)
- Metadasylobus macedonicus Hadzi, 1973
- Metadasylobus pristes (L. Koch, 1867)
- Metadasylobus vorax (L. Koch, 1867)
