= Megistobunus =

Scientific classification
- Domain: Eukaryota
- Kingdom: Animalia
- Phylum: Arthropoda
- Subphylum: Chelicerata
- Class: Arachnida
- Order: Opiliones
- Family: Phalangiidae
- Genus: Megistobunus; Hansen, 1921

Genus of harvestmen/daddy longlegs

Megistobunus is a genus of harvestmen in the family Phalangiidae.

== Species ==
- Megistobunus funereus Lawrence, 1962
- Megistobunus lamottei (Roewer, 1959)
- Megistobunus longipes Hansen, 1921
