= Hindreus =

Scientific classification
- Domain: Eukaryota
- Kingdom: Animalia
- Phylum: Arthropoda
- Subphylum: Chelicerata
- Class: Arachnida
- Order: Opiliones
- Family: Phalangiidae
- Genus: Hindreus; H. Kauri, 1985

Genus of harvestmen/daddy longlegs

Hindreus is a genus of harvestmen in the family Phalangiidae.

== Species ==
- Hindreus crucifer H. Kauri, 1985
- Hindreus elegans H. Kauri, 1985
- Hindreus leleupi (Roewer, 1961)
