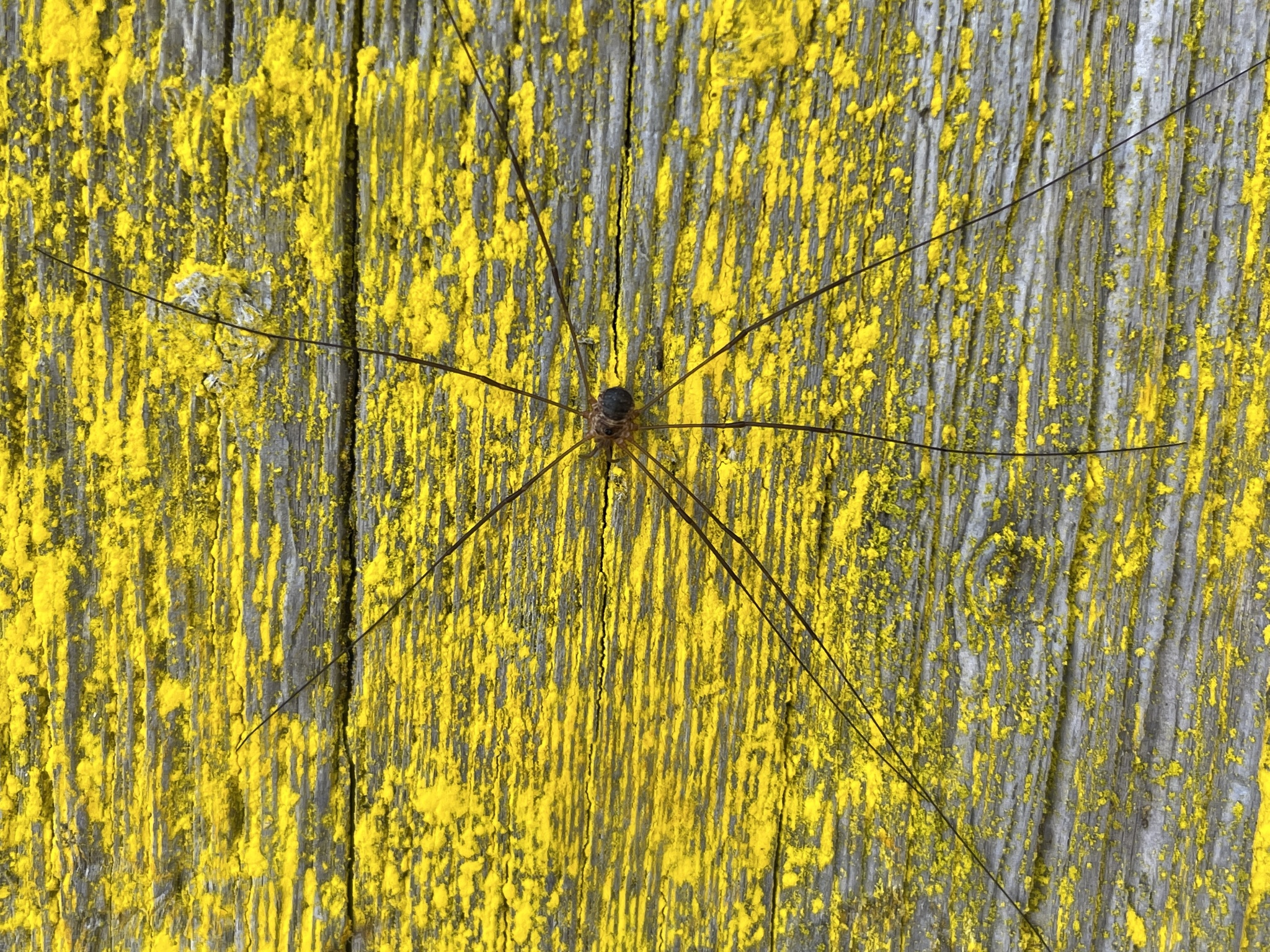

Scientific classification
- Domain: Eukaryota
- Kingdom: Animalia
- Phylum: Arthropoda
- Subphylum: Chelicerata
- Class: Arachnida
- Order: Opiliones
- Family: Phalangiidae
- Genus: Amilenus; Martens, 1969
- Species: A. aurantiacus

Binomial name
- Amilenus aurantiacus (Simon, 1881)

= Amilenus =

Genus of harvestmen/daddy longlegs

Amilenus aurantiacus is a species of harvestmen in a monotypic genus in the family Phalangiidae.
