= Rafalskia =

Scientific classification
- Domain: Eukaryota
- Kingdom: Animalia
- Phylum: Arthropoda
- Subphylum: Chelicerata
- Class: Arachnida
- Order: Opiliones
- Family: Phalangiidae
- Genus: Rafalskia; Starega, 1963
- Species: R. olympica

Binomial name
- Rafalskia olympica (Kulczynski, 1903)

Genus of harvestmen/daddy longlegs

Rafalskia olympica is a species of harvestmen in a monotypic genus in the family Phalangiidae.
