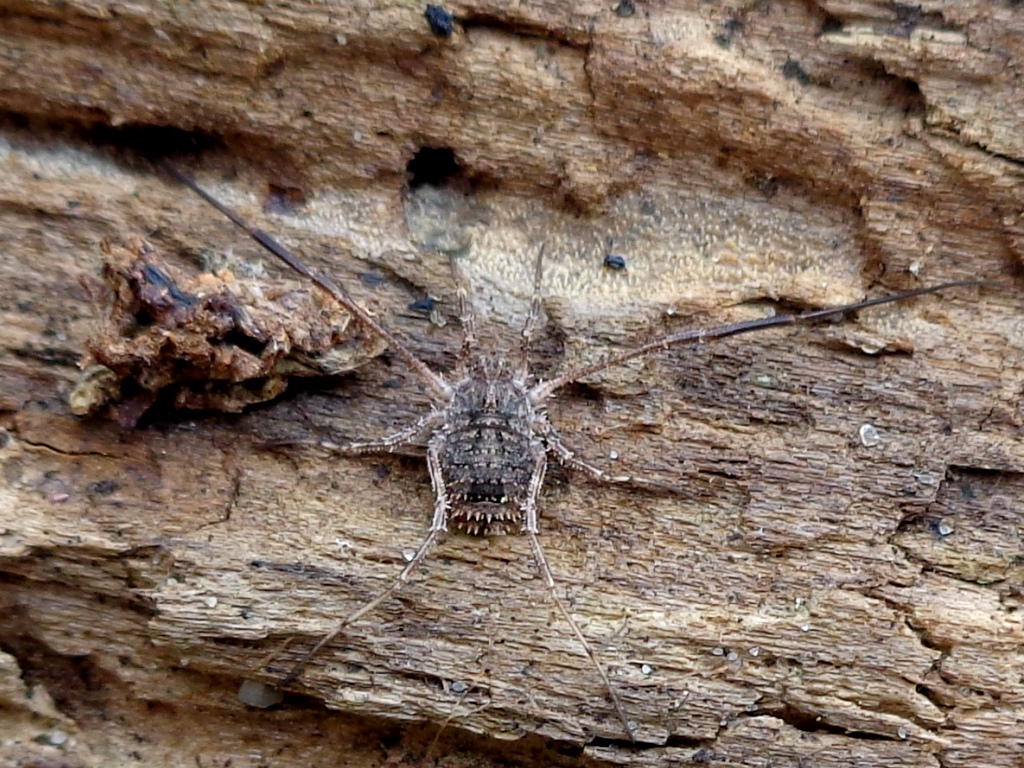
- Lacinius horridus

Scientific classification
- Domain: Eukaryota
- Kingdom: Animalia
- Phylum: Arthropoda
- Subphylum: Chelicerata
- Class: Arachnida
- Order: Opiliones
- Family: Phalangiidae
- Genus: Lacinius; Thorell, 1876

= Lacinius =

Genus of harvestmen/daddy longlegs

Lacinius is a genus of harvestmen in the family Phalangiidae.

== Species ==
- Lacinius angulifer (Simon, 1878)
- Lacinius bidens (Simon, 1880)
- Lacinius carpenteri Roewer, 1953
- Lacinius carpetanus Rambla, 1959
- Lacinius dentiger (C.L.Koch, 1848)
- Lacinius ephippiatus (C.L.Koch, 1835)
- Lacinius erinaceus Starega, 1966
- Lacinius horridus (Panzer, 1794)
- Lacinius insularis Roewer, 1923
- Lacinius longisetus (Thorell, 1876)
- Lacinius magnus Rambla, 1960
- Lacinius ohioensis (Weed, 1889)
- Lacinius regisalexandri Kratochvíl, 1936
- Lacinius ruentalis Kraus, 1961
- Lacinius texanus Banks, 1893
- Lacinius zavalensis Hadzi, 1973
