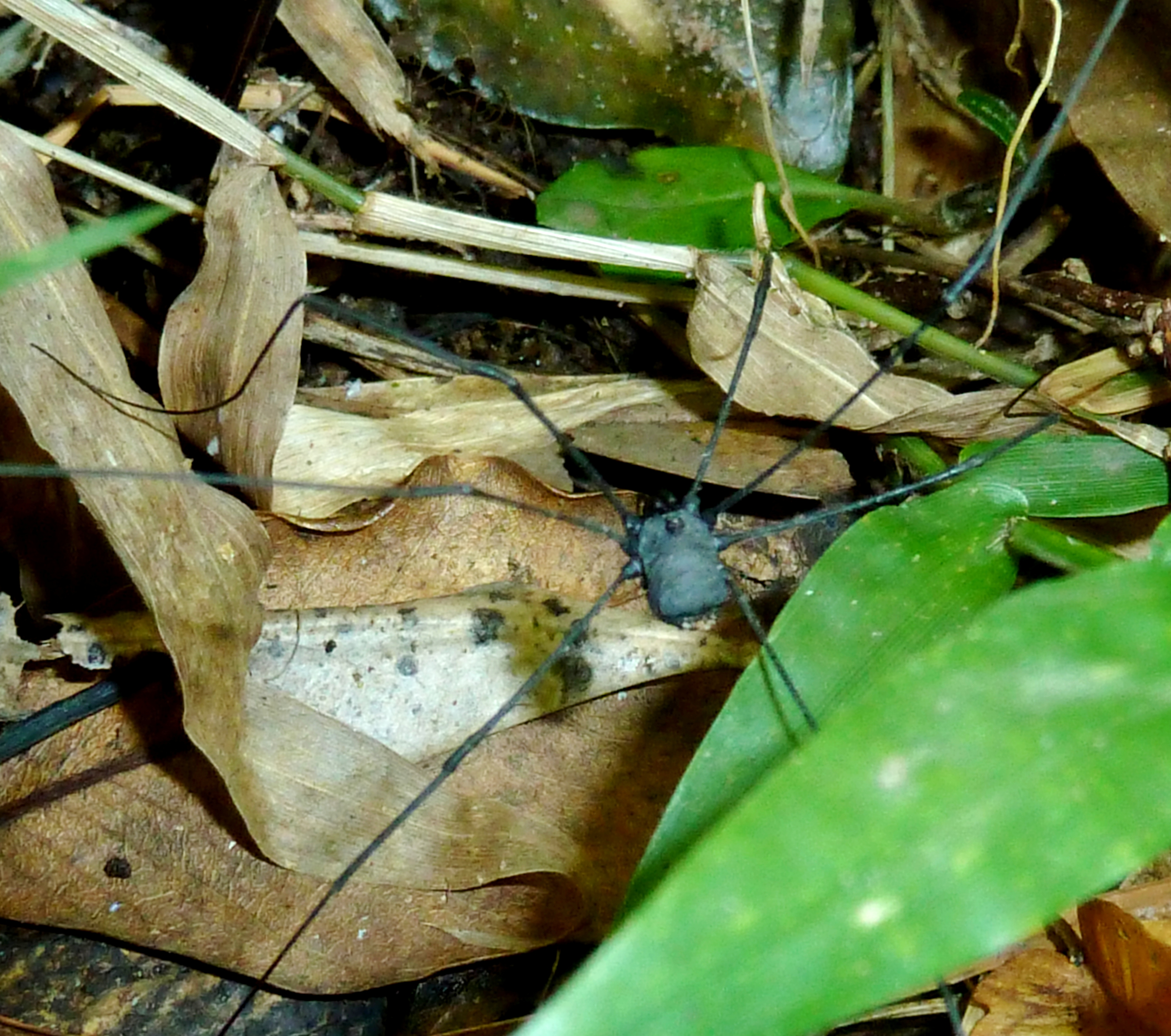

Scientific classification
- Kingdom: Animalia
- Phylum: Arthropoda
- Subphylum: Chelicerata
- Class: Arachnida
- Order: Opiliones
- Family: Phalangiidae
- Genus: Rhampsinitus; Simon, 1879

= Rhampsinitus (harvestman) =

Genus of harvestmen/daddy longlegs

Rhampsinitus is a genus of harvestmen in the family Phalangiidae.

== Species ==
- Rhampsinitus angulatus Lawrence, 1962
- Rhampsinitus ater Roewer, 1912
- Rhampsinitus bettoni (Pocock, 1903)
- Rhampsinitus brevipalpis Lawrence, 1962
- Rhampsinitus brevipes Kauri, 1962
- Rhampsinitus capensis (Loman, 1898)
- Rhampsinitus crassus Loman, 1898
- Rhampsinitus cristatus Lawrence, 1931
- Rhampsinitus discolor (Karsch, 1878)
- Rhampsinitus echinodorsum Roewer, 1912
- Rhampsinitus ephippiatus Roewer, 1956
- Rhampsinitus fissidens Lawrence, 1933
- Rhampsinitus flavidus Lawrence, 1931
- Rhampsinitus forsteri Kauri, 1962
- Rhampsinitus fuscinatus Roewer, 1956
- Rhampsinitus granarius Roewer, 1916
- Rhampsinitus hewittius (Roewer, 1956)
- Rhampsinitus hispidus Roewer, 1911
- Rhampsinitus ingae Kauri, 1962
- Rhampsinitus keniatus (Roewer, 1956)
- Rhampsinitus lalandei Simon, 1879
- Rhampsinitus lawrencei Starega, 1984
- Rhampsinitus leighi Pocock, 1903
- Rhampsinitus levis Lawrence, 1931
- Rhampsinitus longipalpis Lawrence, 1931
- Rhampsinitus maculatus Kauri, 1962
- Rhampsinitus morosianus Kauri, 1962
- Rhampsinitus nubicolus Lawrence, 1963
- Rhampsinitus pectinatus Roewer, 1956
- Rhampsinitus qachasneki Kauri, 1962
- Rhampsinitus quadridens Lawrence, 1949
- Rhampsinitus quadrispina Roewer, 1911
- Rhampsinitus salti Roewer, 1952
- Rhampsinitus silvaticus Lawrence, 1931
- Rhampsinitus soerenseni Mello-Leitão, 1944
- Rhampsinitus scabrichelis Roewer, 1956
- Rhampsinitus scutiger Roewer, 1956
- Rhampsinitus somalicus Caporiacco, 1927
- Rhampsinitus spenceri Pocock, 1903
- Rhampsinitus spinifrons Roewer, 1915
- Rhampsinitus suzukii H. Kauri, 1985
- Rhampsinitus telifrons Pocock, 1903
- Rhampsinitus tenebrosus Lawrence, 1938
- Rhampsinitus traegardhi Kauri, 1962
- Rhampsinitus transvaalicus Lawrence, 1931
- Rhampsinitus unicolor Lawrence, 1931
- Rhampsinitus vittatus Lawrence, 1931
