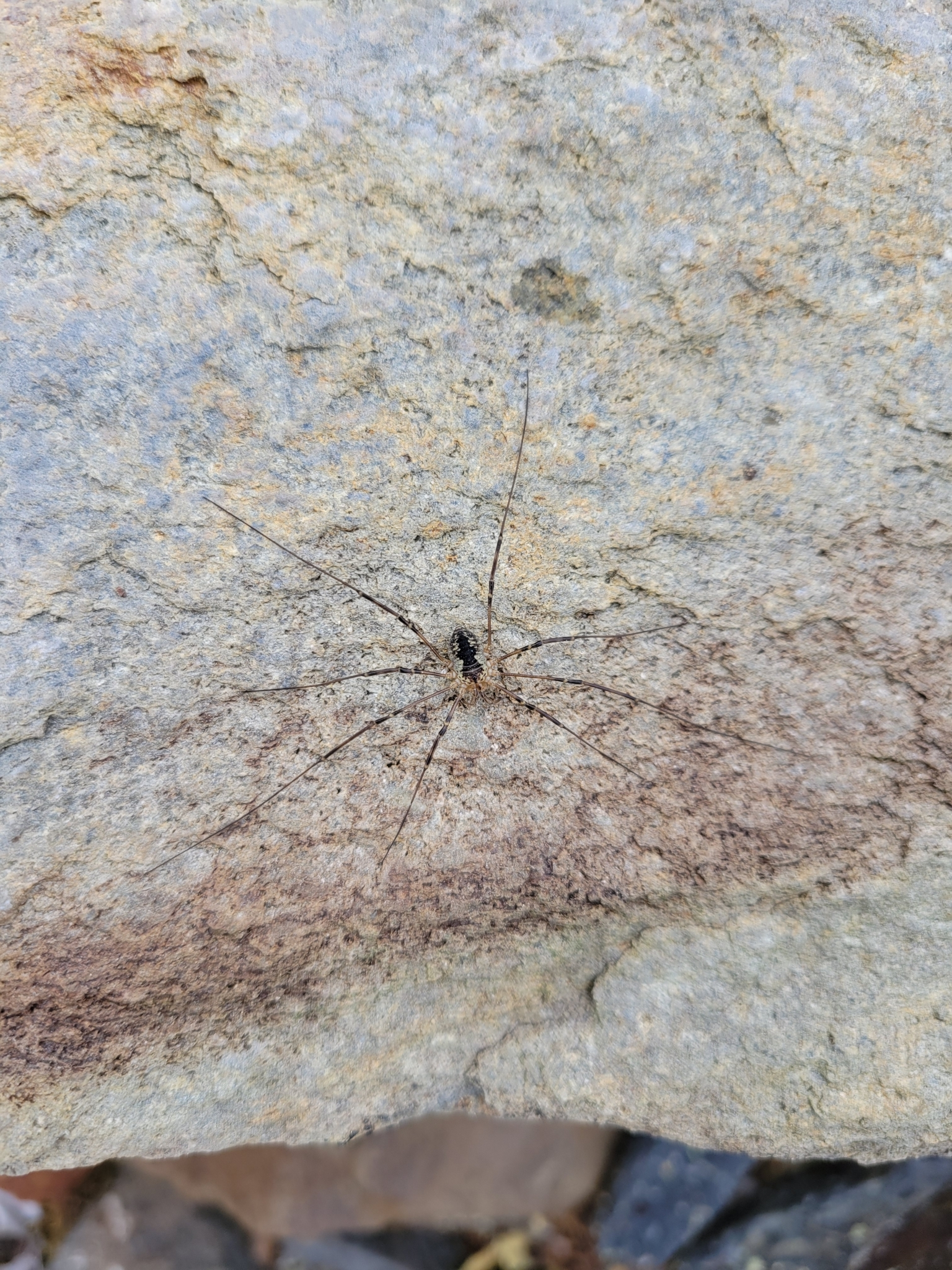
- Liopilio yukon, British Columbia, Canada

Scientific classification
- Domain: Eukaryota
- Kingdom: Animalia
- Phylum: Arthropoda
- Subphylum: Chelicerata
- Class: Arachnida
- Order: Opiliones
- Family: Phalangiidae
- Genus: Liopilio; Schenkel, 1951

= Liopilio =

Genus of harvestmen

Liopilio is a genus of harvestmen in the family Phalangiidae. There are at least two described species in Liopilio, found in northwestern North America.

== Species ==
These two species belong to the genus Liopilio:

- Liopilio glaber Schenkel, 1951
- Liopilio yukon Cokendolpher, 1981
