= Roeweritta =

Scientific classification
- Domain: Eukaryota
- Kingdom: Animalia
- Phylum: Arthropoda
- Subphylum: Chelicerata
- Class: Arachnida
- Order: Opiliones
- Family: Phalangiidae
- Genus: Roeweritta; Silhavý, 1965
- Species: R. carpentieri

Binomial name
- Roeweritta carpentieri (Roewer, 1953)

Genus of harvestmen/daddy longlegs

Roeweritta carpentieri is a species of harvestmen in a monotypic genus in the family Phalangiidae.
