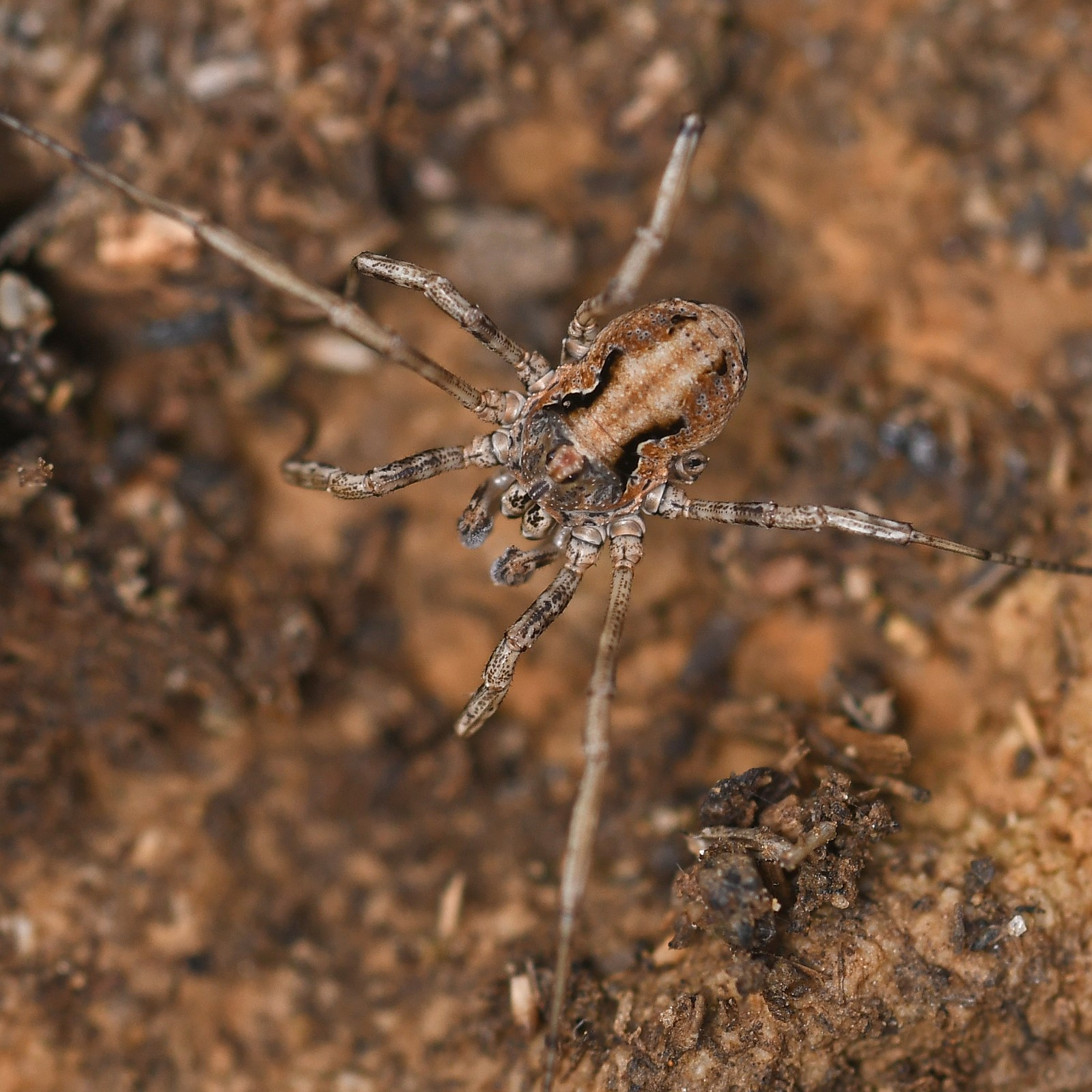
- Graecophalangium cretaeum

Scientific classification
- Kingdom: Animalia
- Phylum: Arthropoda
- Subphylum: Chelicerata
- Class: Arachnida
- Order: Opiliones
- Family: Phalangiidae
- Genus: Graecophalangium; Roewer, 1923

= Graecophalangium =

Genus of harvestmen/daddy longlegs

Graecophalangium is a genus of harvestmen in the family Phalangiidae.

== Species ==
- Graecophalangium atticum Roewer, 1923
- Graecophalangium cretaeum Martens, 1966
- Graecophalangium drenskii P. Mitvov, 1995
- Graecophalangium militare (C.L.Koch, 1839)
- Graecophalangium punicum Starega, 1973
- Graecophalangium anatolicum (Dr. Kemal Kurt, 2022)
