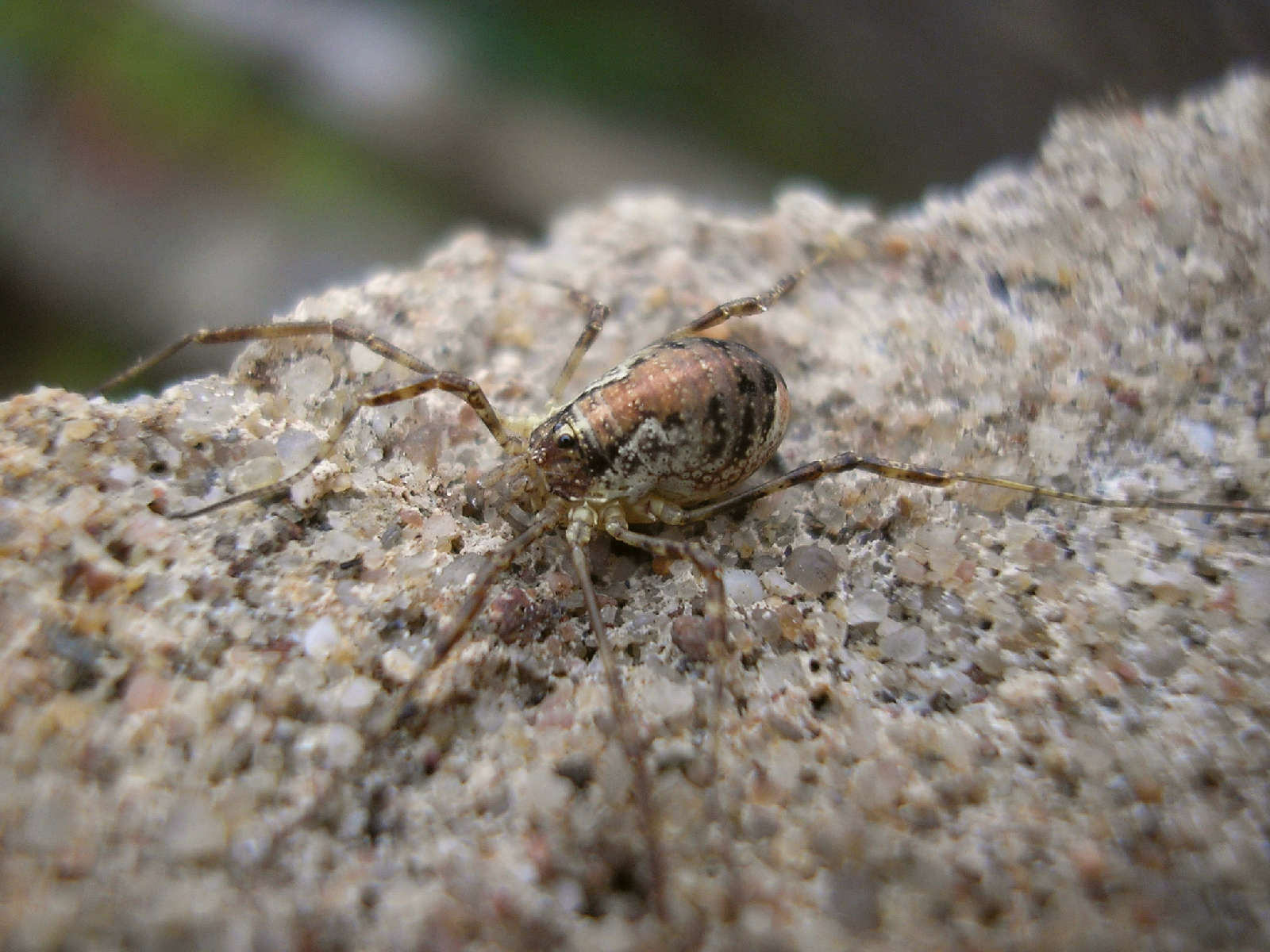

Scientific classification
- Kingdom: Animalia
- Phylum: Arthropoda
- Subphylum: Chelicerata
- Class: Arachnida
- Order: Opiliones
- Family: Phalangiidae
- Genus: Paroligolophus
- Species: P. agrestis

Binomial name
- Paroligolophus agrestis (Meade, 1855)

Synonyms
- Opilio agrestis Oligolophus ephippiger

= Paroligolophus agrestis =

Species of harvestman/daddy longlegs

Paroligolophus agrestis is a species of harvestman. It occurs in Europe, including the United Kingdom, and has been introduced to North America in the Pacific Northwest and Nova Scotia.

Mature females have bodies about 6 mm long, mature males are smaller at about 4 mm. As with almost all harvestmen, the second leg is longest, being around 14–20 mm when fully extended. The patellae and tibiae have distinct angles rather than being rounded. The upper surface of the body is usually brown with grey and red shades, with a line of whitish markings along the centre. The tendency to red is regarded as a useful identification character. There may be darker markings at the rear with lighter lines across the body. The area between the eyes is notably light in colour. On the underside, the genital plate is notched, particularly in the female – a distinctive feature of this species.
