= Paraplatybunus =

Scientific classification
- Kingdom: Animalia
- Phylum: Arthropoda
- Class: Arachnida
- Order: Opiliones
- Family: Phalangiidae
- Genus: Platybunus
- Subgenus: Paraplatybunus Dumitrescu, 1970

Subgenus of harvestmen

Paraplatybunus was a proposed subgenus of harvestmen in the family Phalangiidae. It is subsequently treated as a junior subjective synonym of Rilaena Šilhavý, 1965. It was originally created as Platybunus (Paraplatybunus) Dumitrescu, 1970, with the type species as Opilio triangularis Herbst, 1799, later recombined as Rilaena triangularis (Herbst, 1799).

It has been (mis)listed online at the rank of genus, yet no statement to that effect has been since found in the published literature.

== Species ==
- Platybunus (Paraplatybunus) triangularis (Herbst, 1799), listed in Hallan Catalog as "Paraplatybunus triangularis (Herbst, 1799) [type]". [= Rilaena triangularis (Herbst, 1799)]

Note: Dumitrescu, 1970 (p.88) also mentions "P. anatolicus, Roewer" (later Rilaena anatolica (Roewer, 1956)) and "P. buresi Šilhavý" (later Rilaena buresi (Šilhavý, 1965)) may belong in his subgenus Platybunus (Paraplatybunus).

Erroneous:

- "Paraplatybunus decui Dumitrescu, 1970" in Hallan Catalog seemingly as an unpublished combination with mistaken taxon authority. This taxon is likely to instead correspond to as Platybunus decui Avram, 1968 not mentioned in Dumitrescu, 1970, and certainly not as new]
