= Acanthomegabunus =

Scientific classification
- Domain: Eukaryota
- Kingdom: Animalia
- Phylum: Arthropoda
- Subphylum: Chelicerata
- Class: Arachnida
- Order: Opiliones
- Family: Phalangiidae
- Subfamily: Platybuninae
- Genus: Acanthomegabunus; Tsurusaki, Chemeris & Logunov, 2000

Genus of harvestmen/daddy longlegs

Acanthomegabunus is a genus of harvestmen in the family Phalangiidae. There are at least two described species in Acanthomegabunus.

== Species ==
These two species belong to the genus Acanthomegabunus:

- Acanthomegabunus altaicus Chemeris, 2015 (Russia, Kazakhstan)
- Acanthomegabunus sibiricus Tsurusaki, Chemeris & Logunov, 2000 (Siberia)
