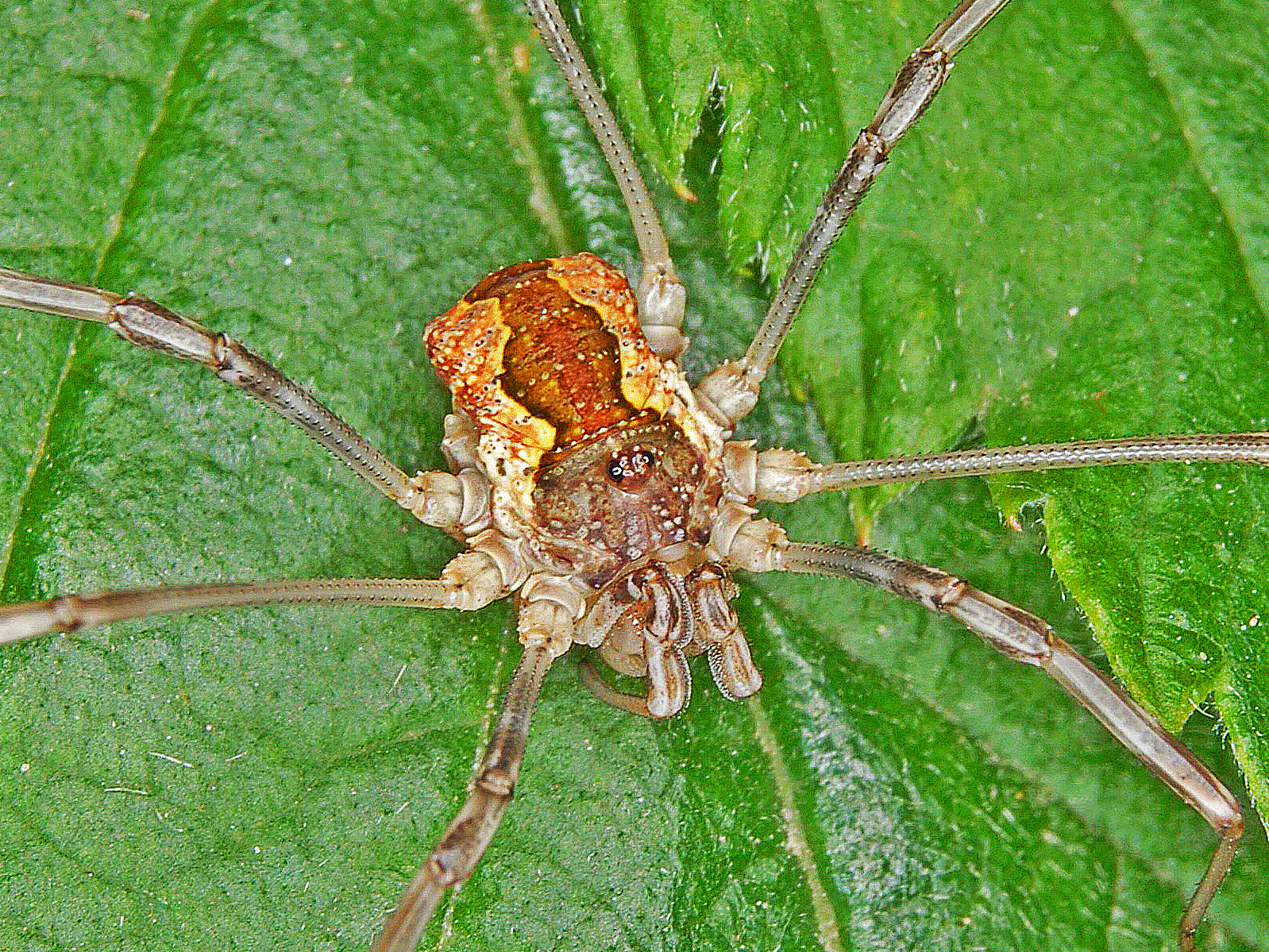
- Mitopus morio

Scientific classification
- Kingdom: Animalia
- Phylum: Arthropoda
- Subphylum: Chelicerata
- Class: Arachnida
- Order: Opiliones
- Family: Phalangiidae
- Subfamily: Oligolophinae
- Genus: Mitopus; Thorell, 1876

Type species
- Phalangium morio Fabricius, 1779

Species
- See text.

Diversity
- 9 species

= Mitopus =

Genus of harvestmen/daddy longlegs

Mitopus is a genus of the harvestman family Phalangiidae with nine described species.

== Species ==
- Mitopus mobilis Karsch, 1881 (Japan)
- Mitopus dorsalis Banks, 1900 (Alaska)
- Mitopus ericaeus Jennings, 1982 (England)
- Mitopus glacialis (Heer, 1845)
- Mitopus koreanus (Roewer, 1957)
- Mitopus mongolicus Roewer, 1912 (Mongolia)
- Mitopus morio (Fabricius, 1779)
- Mitopus obliquus (C. L. Koch, 1839) (Alps, Greece)
- Mitopus projectus (Goodnight & Goodnight, 1942) (Oregon)
