= Platybunoides =

Scientific classification
- Domain: Eukaryota
- Kingdom: Animalia
- Phylum: Arthropoda
- Subphylum: Chelicerata
- Class: Arachnida
- Order: Opiliones
- Family: Phalangiidae
- Genus: Platybunoides; Silhavý, 1956
- Species: P. argaea

Binomial name
- Platybunoides argaea Silhavý, 1956

Genus of harvestmen/daddy longlegs

Platybunoides argaea is a species of harvestmen in a monotypic genus in the family Phalangiidae.
