= Buresilia =

Scientific classification
- Kingdom: Animalia
- Phylum: Arthropoda
- Subphylum: Chelicerata
- Class: Arachnida
- Order: Opiliones
- Family: Phalangiidae
- Subfamily: Platybuninae
- Genus: Buresilia; Silhavý, 1965

Type species
- Buresilia nigerrima (Roewer, 1956)

Diversity
- 4 species

Genus of harvestmen/daddy longlegs

Buresilia is a genus of harvestmen in the family Phalangiidae with three described species (as of 2023). The species are found in West Asia, Anatolia and Cyprus.

In some older listings, the species Buresilia nigerrima is malformed as the masculine "nigerrimus"

== Description ==
The genus Buresilia was described by Vladimír Šilhavý, 1965 with the type species Metadasylobus nigerrimus Roewer, 1956, revised as Buresilia nigerrima (Roewer, 1956).

== Etymology ==
The genus was named after Bulgarian zoologist Dr. Ivan Bureš. It is feminine, yet in some older databases the wrongly inflected masculine name "Buresilia nigerrimus" persists.

== Species ==
- Buresilia gumushanensis Kurt & Kurt, 2024 – Turkey
- Buresilia kibrisensis Kurt, Kunt & Gucel, 2022 – Cyprus
- Buresilia macrina (Roewer, 1956) – Turkey
- Buresilia nigerrima (Roewer, 1956) – Turkey
