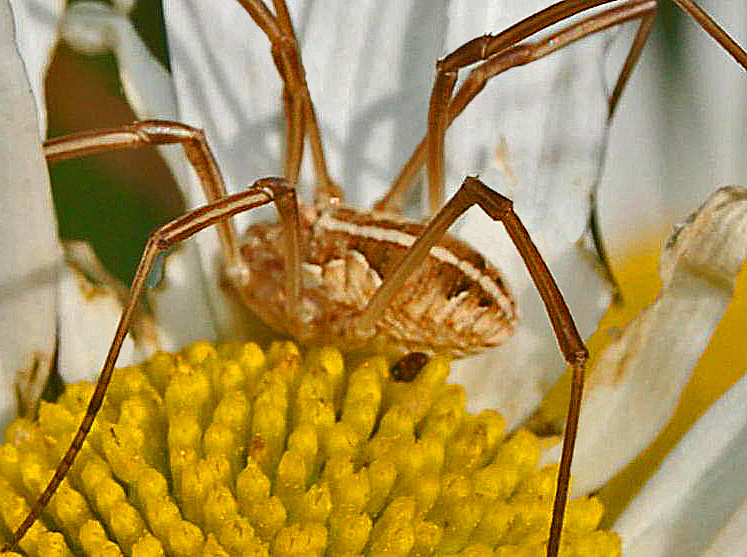
- Metaphalangium cirtanum

Scientific classification
- Domain: Eukaryota
- Kingdom: Animalia
- Phylum: Arthropoda
- Subphylum: Chelicerata
- Class: Arachnida
- Order: Opiliones
- Family: Phalangiidae
- Genus: Metaphalangium; Roewer, 1911

= Metaphalangium =

Genus of harvestmen/daddy longlegs

Metaphalangium is a genus of harvestmen in the family Phalangiidae.

== Species ==
- Metaphalangium abruptus (Kollar, in Roewer 1911)
- Metaphalangium abstrusus (L.Koch, 1882)
- Metaphalangium albiunilineatum (Lucas, 1847)
- Metaphalangium bispinifrons (Roewer, 1911)
- Metaphalangium cirtanum (C.L.Koch, 1839)
- Metaphalangium leiobuniformis (C.L.Koch, 1872)
- Metaphalangium monticola (Mkheidze, 1952)
- Metaphalangium orientale Starega, 1973
- Metaphalangium punctatus Roewer, 1956
- Metaphalangium spiniferum (Lucas, 1840)
- Metaphalangium spinipes Roewer, 1956
- Metaphalangium strandi (Nosek, 1905)
- Metaphalangium sudanum Roewer, 1961
- Metaphalangium tuberculatum (Lucas, 1847)
