= Mitopiella =

Scientific classification
- Domain: Eukaryota
- Kingdom: Animalia
- Phylum: Arthropoda
- Subphylum: Chelicerata
- Class: Arachnida
- Order: Opiliones
- Family: Sclerosomatidae
- Subfamily: Gagrellinae
- Genus: Mitopiella; Banks, 1930
- Species: M. cinctipes

Binomial name
- Mitopiella cinctipes Banks, 1930

Genus of harvestmen/daddy longlegs

Mitopiella cinctipes is a species of harvestmen in a monotypic genus in the family Phalangiidae.
