= Bunochelis =

Scientific classification
- Domain: Eukaryota
- Kingdom: Animalia
- Phylum: Arthropoda
- Subphylum: Chelicerata
- Class: Arachnida
- Order: Opiliones
- Family: Phalangiidae
- Genus: Bunochelis; Roewer, 1923

Genus of harvestmen/daddy longlegs

Bunochelis is a genus of harvestmen in the family Phalangiidae.

== Species ==
- Bunochelis canariana (Strand, 1911)
- Bunochelis spinifera (Simon, 1878)
