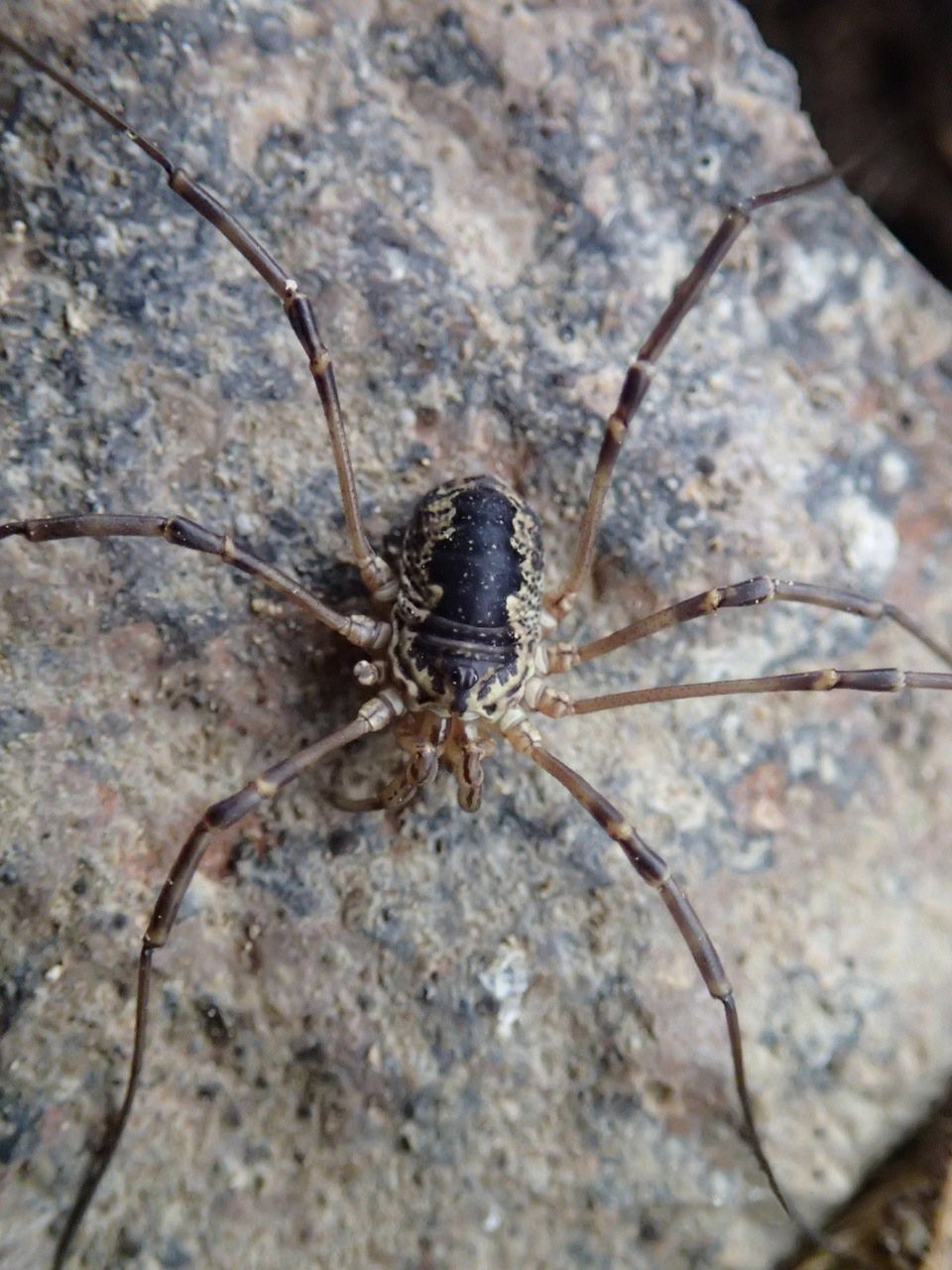
- Leptobunus borealis

Scientific classification
- Domain: Eukaryota
- Kingdom: Animalia
- Phylum: Arthropoda
- Subphylum: Chelicerata
- Class: Arachnida
- Order: Opiliones
- Family: Phalangiidae
- Genus: Leptobunus; Banks, 1893

= Leptobunus =

Genus of harvestmen/daddy longlegs

Leptobunus is a genus of harvestmen in the family Phalangiidae.

== Species ==
- Leptobunus aureus J. C. Cokendolpher, 1984
- Leptobunus borealis Banks, 1899
- Leptobunus californicus Banks, 1893
- Leptobunus pallidus J. C. Cokendolpher, 1984
- Leptobunus parvulus (Banks, 1894)
