= Zachaeus =

- Z. crista, Turkey

Scientific classification
- Kingdom: Animalia
- Phylum: Arthropoda
- Subphylum: Chelicerata
- Class: Arachnida
- Order: Opiliones
- Family: Phalangiidae
- Genus: Zachaeus; C.L.Koch, 1839

Genus of harvestmen

Zachaeus is a genus of harvestmen in the family Phalangiidae.

== Species ==
- Zachaeus anatolicus (Kulczynski, 1903)
- Zachaeus birulae Redikorzev, 1936
- Zachaeus crista (Brullé, 1832)
- Zachaeus hebraicus (Simon, 1884)
- Zachaeus hyrcanus Redikorzev, 1936
- Zachaeus kervillei (Sørensen, 1912)
- Zachaeus leucomelas (Simon, 1884)
- Zachaeus mirabilis (Caporiacco, 1949)
- Zachaeus orchimonti (Giltay, 1933)
- Zachaeus redikorzevi (V. Starenga & B. P. Chevrizov, 1978)
