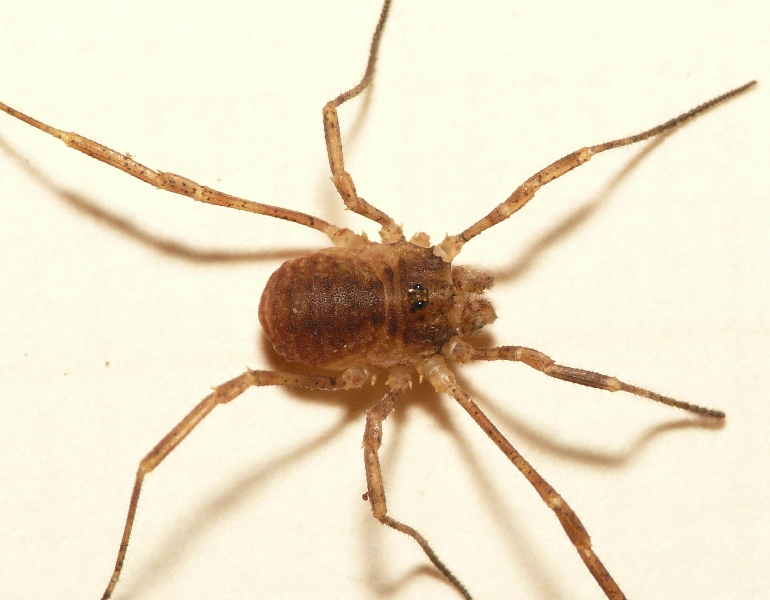
- Lophopilio palpinalis

Scientific classification
- Kingdom: Animalia
- Phylum: Arthropoda
- Subphylum: Chelicerata
- Class: Arachnida
- Order: Opiliones
- Family: Phalangiidae
- Genus: Lophopilio; Hadži, 1931
- Species: L. palpinalis

Binomial name
- Lophopilio palpinalis (Herbst, 1799)

= Lophopilio =

Genus of harvestmen/daddy longlegs

Lophopilio is a monotypic genus of harvestmen in the family Phalangiidae. This genus has a single species, Lophopilio palpinalis, found across Europe, including the UK, from Scandinavia to Estonia, then southerly widespread in Central and Western Europe. It has also been spotted further south in Bulgaria, Montenegro and Bosnia-Herzegovina.

== Species ==
- Lophopilio palpinalis (Herbst, 1799)

Some older online listings also include the name "Lophopilio ephippiata (Hadži, 1973)". However this recombination appears to have never been published, and instead refers to Bolea ephippiata Hadži 1973 which was synonymised with Lophopilio palpinalis (Herbst, 1799) by Martens, 1978.
