= Dacnopilio =

Scientific classification
- Kingdom: Animalia
- Phylum: Arthropoda
- Subphylum: Chelicerata
- Class: Arachnida
- Order: Opiliones
- Family: Phalangiidae
- Genus: Dacnopilio; Roewer, 1911

Genus of harvestmen/daddy longlegs

Dacnopilio is a genus of harvestmen in the family Phalangiidae.

== Species ==
- Dacnopilio armatus Roewer, 1911
- Dacnopilio insularis Hansen, 1921
- Dacnopilio kraepelini (Roewer, 1911)
- Dacnopilio quadridentatus Lawrence, 1965
- Dacnopilio scopulatus Lawrence, 1963
