= Tchapinius =

Scientific classification
- Domain: Eukaryota
- Kingdom: Animalia
- Phylum: Arthropoda
- Subphylum: Chelicerata
- Class: Arachnida
- Order: Opiliones
- Family: Phalangiidae
- Genus: Tchapinius; Roewer, 1929
- Species: T. malaisei

Binomial name
- Tchapinius malaisei Roewer, 1929

Genus of harvestmen/daddy longlegs

Tchapinius malaisei is a species of harvestmen in a monotypic genus in the family Phalangiidae. The species is widespread and common in the plains and mountains of Eurasia throughout the Palearctic.

== Physical Characterization ==
- The flat median hill of the Carapace frontal edge covered with 3-5 pointed granules.
- Trochanter and femur only hairy, patella dorsal sparsely and irregularly, medial as well as the tibia medial densely brushed hairy, but without apophyses, tarsus only hairy, but in the male ventrally-medially with a longitudinal stripe of fine teeth.
- Legs: Trochanteric and femora such as patellae tibia and metatarsus only finely densely hairy.

[Description translated from original German article]
