= Stankiella =

Scientific classification
- Domain: Eukaryota
- Kingdom: Animalia
- Phylum: Arthropoda
- Subphylum: Chelicerata
- Class: Arachnida
- Order: Opiliones
- Family: Phalangiidae
- Subfamily: Platybuninae
- Genus: Stankiella; Hadži, 1973

Genus of harvestmen

Stankiella is a genus of harvestmen in the family Phalangiidae. There are at least two described species in Stankiella.

== Species ==
These two species belong to the genus Stankiella:

- Stankiella montana Hadži, 1973
- Stankiella pretneri Hadži, 1973
