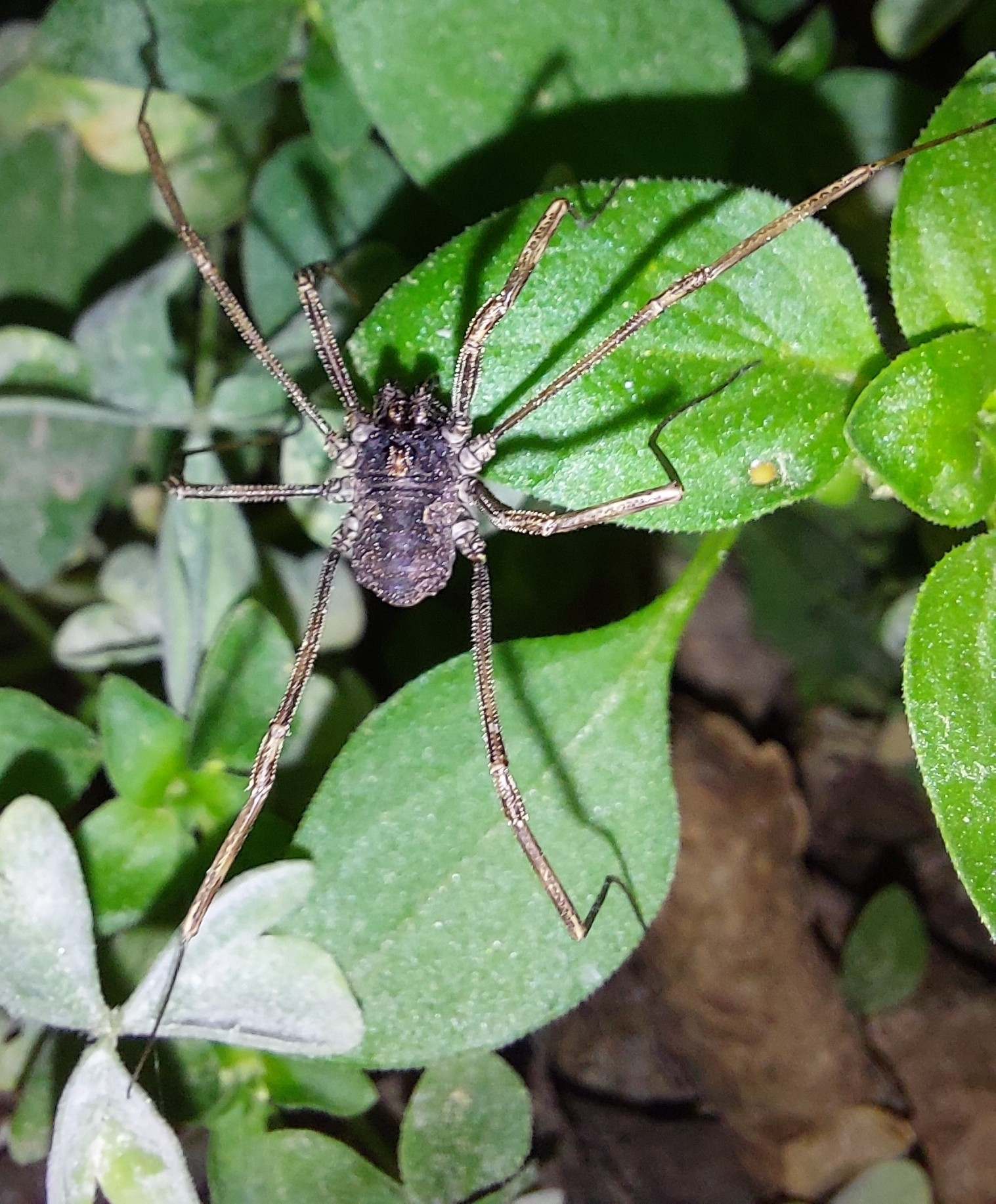
- Metaplatybunus grandissimus, Greece

Scientific classification
- Domain: Eukaryota
- Kingdom: Animalia
- Phylum: Arthropoda
- Subphylum: Chelicerata
- Class: Arachnida
- Order: Opiliones
- Family: Phalangiidae
- Subfamily: Platybuninae
- Genus: Metaplatybunus; Roewer, 1911

= Metaplatybunus =

Genus of harvestmen

Metaplatybunus is a genus of harvestmen in the family Phalangiidae. There are about 12 described species in Metaplatybunus, found mainly in the Mediterranean region.

== Species ==
These 12 species belong to the genus Metaplatybunus:

- Metaplatybunus carneluttii Hadži, 1973
- Metaplatybunus corcyraeus Roewer, 1956
- Metaplatybunus denticulatus Marcellino, 1972
- Metaplatybunus filipes Roewer, 1956
- Metaplatybunus georgicus Mkheidze, 1952
- Metaplatybunus grandissimus (Koch, 1839)
- Metaplatybunus hypanicus Šilhavý, 1966
- Metaplatybunus obliquus (Koch, 1839)
- Metaplatybunus rhodiensis Roewer, 1924
- Metaplatybunus salfi Lerma, 1952
- Metaplatybunus strigosus (Koch, 1867)
- Metaplatybunus valentinae Snegovaya, 2022
