= Bactrophalangium =

Scientific classification
- Kingdom: Animalia
- Phylum: Arthropoda
- Subphylum: Chelicerata
- Class: Arachnida
- Order: Opiliones
- Family: Phalangiidae
- Genus: Bactrophalangium; Šilhavý, 1966

Genus of harvestmen/daddy longlegs

Bactrophalangium is a genus of harvestmen in the family Phalangiidae described by Šilhavý in 1966.

== Species ==
- Bactrophalangium ghissaricum (Gricenko, 1976)
- Bactrophalangium jakesi Silhavý, 1966

== Synonymy ==
In 2009, N. Snegovaya & W. Staręga synonymized this genus with Phalangium, on the grounds that the shape of the horn on the second segment of the male chelicera (the only diagnostic character of the genus Bactrophalangium) fits well within the range demonstrated by the rest of the genus Phalangium. These species have therefore been renamed Phalangium ghissaricum Gricenko, 1976 and Phalangium jakesi (Šilhavý, 1966).
