= Cristina (harvestman) =

Scientific classification
- Domain: Eukaryota
- Kingdom: Animalia
- Phylum: Arthropoda
- Subphylum: Chelicerata
- Class: Arachnida
- Order: Opiliones
- Family: Phalangiidae
- Genus: Cristina; Loman, 1902

Genus of harvestmen/daddy longlegs

Cristina is a genus of harvestmen in the family Phalangiidae.

== Species ==
- Cristina adenia (Roewer, 1941)
- Cristina bispinifrons Roewer, 1916
- Cristina crassipes Loman, 1902
- Cristina lettowi (Roewer, 1923)
- Cristina pachylomera (Simon, 1879)
- Cristina patellaris (Roewer, 1956)
- Cristina pteronia (Sorensen, 1910)
- Cristina ruandana H. Kauri, 1985
- Cristina somalica (Roewer, 1956)
- Cristina spinosus (C.J.Goodnight & M.L.Goodnight, 1944)
- Cristina subinermis Caporiacco, 1946
- Cristina villiersi (Roewer, 1953)
- Cristina zavattarii Caporiaxxo, 1940
