= Himalphalangium =

Scientific classification
- Kingdom: Animalia
- Phylum: Arthropoda
- Subphylum: Chelicerata
- Class: Arachnida
- Order: Opiliones
- Family: Phalangiidae
- Genus: Himalphalangium; Martens, 1973

Genus of harvestmen/daddy longlegs

Himalphalangium is a genus of harvestmen in the family Phalangiidae.

== Species ==
- Himalphalangium curvatum Martens, 2018
- Himalphalangium dolpoense Martens, 1973
- Himalphalangium nepalensis (Suzuki, 1970)
- Himalphalangium palpalis (Roewer, 1956)
- Himalphalangium spinulatum (Roewer, 1911)
- Himalphalangium suzukii Martens, 1973
- Himalphalangium unistriatum Martens, 1973
