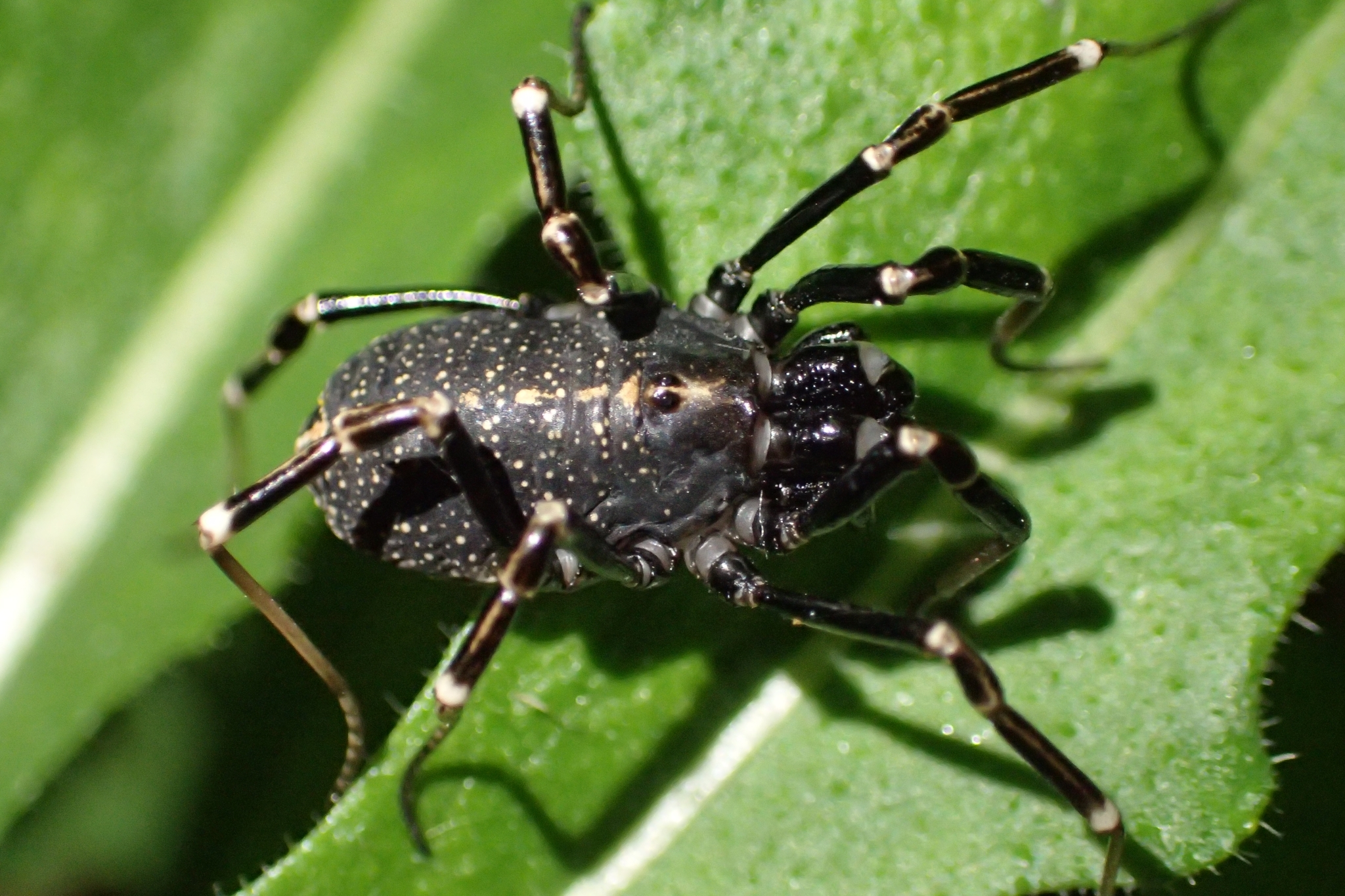
- Egaenus convexus, Croatia

Scientific classification
- Domain: Eukaryota
- Kingdom: Animalia
- Phylum: Arthropoda
- Subphylum: Chelicerata
- Class: Arachnida
- Order: Opiliones
- Family: Phalangiidae
- Genus: Egaenus; C.L.Koch, in Hahn & C.L.Koch, 1839

= Egaenus =

Genus of harvestmen/daddy longlegs

Egaenus is a genus of harvestmen in the family Phalangiidae, found mainly in Europe.

== Species ==
- Egaenus amanensis (Simon, 1884)
- Egaenus asiaticus Roewer, 1914
- Egaenus bajsun Starega, 1979
- Egaenus charitonovi (Gricenko, 1972)
- Egaenus convexus (C.L.Koch, 1835)
- Egaenus diadema Simon, 1885
- Egaenus kashmiricus Caporiacco, 1935
- Egaenus laevipes (Caporiacco, 1935)
- Egaenus marenzelleri Nosek, 1905
- Egaenus montanus Starega, 1979
- Egaenus oedipus (Thorell, 1876)
- Egaenus robustus Kulczynski, in Zichy 1901
- Egaenus rugosus Schenkel, 1963
- Egaenus zichyi Kulczynski, in Zichy 1901
