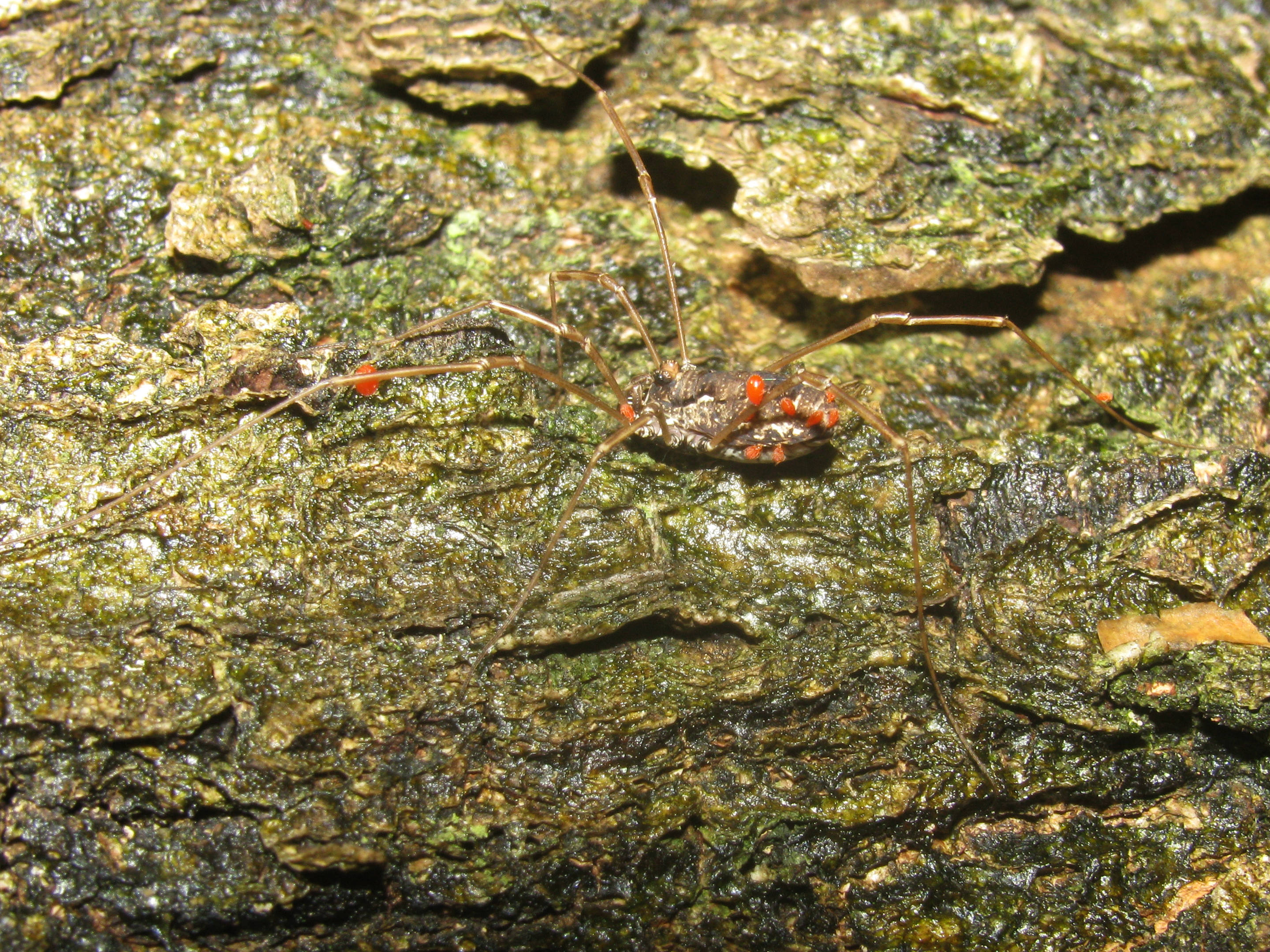
- Platybunus pinetorum

Scientific classification
- Domain: Eukaryota
- Kingdom: Animalia
- Phylum: Arthropoda
- Subphylum: Chelicerata
- Class: Arachnida
- Order: Opiliones
- Family: Phalangiidae
- Genus: Platybunus; C.L.Koch, 1839

= Platybunus =

Genus of harvestmen/daddy longlegs

Platybunus is a genus of harvestmen in the family Phalangiidae.

== Species ==
- Platybunus arbuteus Simon, 1879
- Platybunus alpinorelictus J. Martens, 1978
- Platybunus anatolicus Roewer, 1956
- Platybunus bucephalus (C.L.Koch, 1835)
- Platybunus buresi Silhavý, 1965
- Platybunus decui Avram, 1968
- Platybunus femoralis Roewer, 1956
- Platybunus hadzii Kratchvil, 1935
- Platybunus hypanicus (Silhavý, 1966)
- Platybunus jeporum Avram, 1968
- Platybunus juvarae Avram, 1968
- Platybunus kratochvili Hadzi, 1973
- Platybunus mirus Loman, in Weber 1892
- Platybunus nigrovittatus Simon, 1879
- Platybunus hungaricus Szalay, 1949
- Platybunus pallidus Silhavý, 1938
- Platybunus pinetorum (C.L.Koch, 1839)
- Platybunus placidus Simon, 1879
- Platybunus pucillus Roewer, 1952
- Platybunus strigosus (L.Koch, 1867)
- Platybunus triangularis (Herbst, 1799)
