= Odontobunus =

Scientific classification
- Domain: Eukaryota
- Kingdom: Animalia
- Phylum: Arthropoda
- Subphylum: Chelicerata
- Class: Arachnida
- Order: Opiliones
- Family: Phalangiidae
- Genus: Odontobunus; Roewer, 1910

Genus of harvestmen/daddy longlegs

Odontobunus is a genus of harvestmen in the family Phalangiidae.

== Species ==
- Odontobunus africanus Roewer, 1910
- Odontobunus armatus (Sørensen, 1910)
- Odontobunus elegans (Roewer, 1956)
- Odontobunus kenianus Roewer, 1957
- Odontobunus lelupi (Roewer, 1961)
- Odontobunus longipes (Lawrence, 1963)
- Odontobunus niger (Roewer, 1956)
- Odontobunus punctatus (Roewer, 1956)
- Odontobunus pupillaris (Lawrence, 1963)
