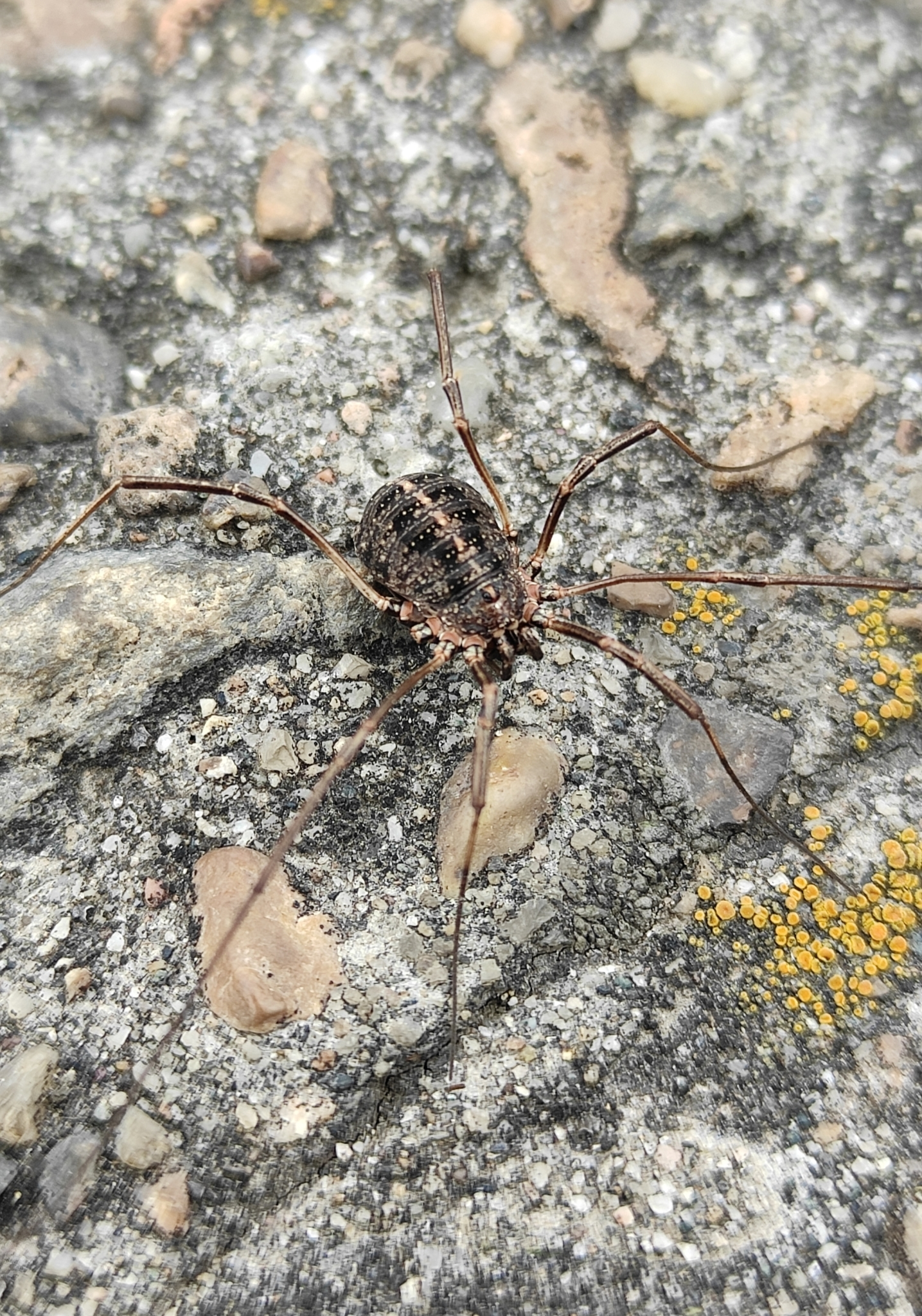

Scientific classification
- Domain: Eukaryota
- Kingdom: Animalia
- Phylum: Arthropoda
- Subphylum: Chelicerata
- Class: Arachnida
- Order: Opiliones
- Family: Phalangiidae
- Genus: Homolophus; Banks, 1893

= Homolophus =

Genus of arachnids

Homolophus is a genus of harvestmen in the family Phalangiidae.

== Species ==
- Homolophus afghanum (Roewer, 1956)
- Homolophus albofasciatum (Kulczynski, 1901)
- Homolophus altaicum Roewer, 1923
- Homolophus arcticus Banks, 1893
- Homolophus betpakdalense (Gritzenko, 1976)
- Homolophus chitralense (Roewer, 1956)
- Homolophus coreanum (Roewer, 1927b)
- Homolophus funestus L.Koch, 1877
- Homolophus gobiensis Tsurusaki, Tchemeris & Logunov, 2000
- Homolophus lindbergi (Roewer, 1960)
- Homolophus luteum Suzuki, 1966
- Homolophus martensi (W. Starega, 1986)
- Homolophus nepalicus (Roewer, 1912)
- Homolophus pallens (Kulczynski, 1901)
- Homolophus panpema Suzuki, 1966
- Homolophus punctatus Banks, 1894
- Homolophus rishiri N. Tsurusaki, 1987
- Homolophus suzukii Silhvay, 1972
- Homolophus thienshanense (Silhavý, 1967)
- Homolophus tibetanus (Roewer, 1911)
- Homolophus transbaicalicum (Kulczynski, 1901)
- Homolophus trinkleri (Roewer, 1956)
- Homolophus turcicum (Roewer, 1959)
- Homolophus vernale Starega, 1979
- Homolophus vladimirae (Silhavý, 1967)
