= Ramblinus =

Scientific classification
- Domain: Eukaryota
- Kingdom: Animalia
- Phylum: Arthropoda
- Subphylum: Chelicerata
- Class: Arachnida
- Order: Opiliones
- Family: Phalangiidae
- Genus: Ramblinus; Starega, 1984
- Species: R. spinipalpis

Binomial name
- Ramblinus spinipalpis (Roewer, 1911)

Genus of harvestmen/daddy longlegs

Ramblinus spinipalpis is a species of harvestmen in a monotypic genus in the family Phalangiidae.
