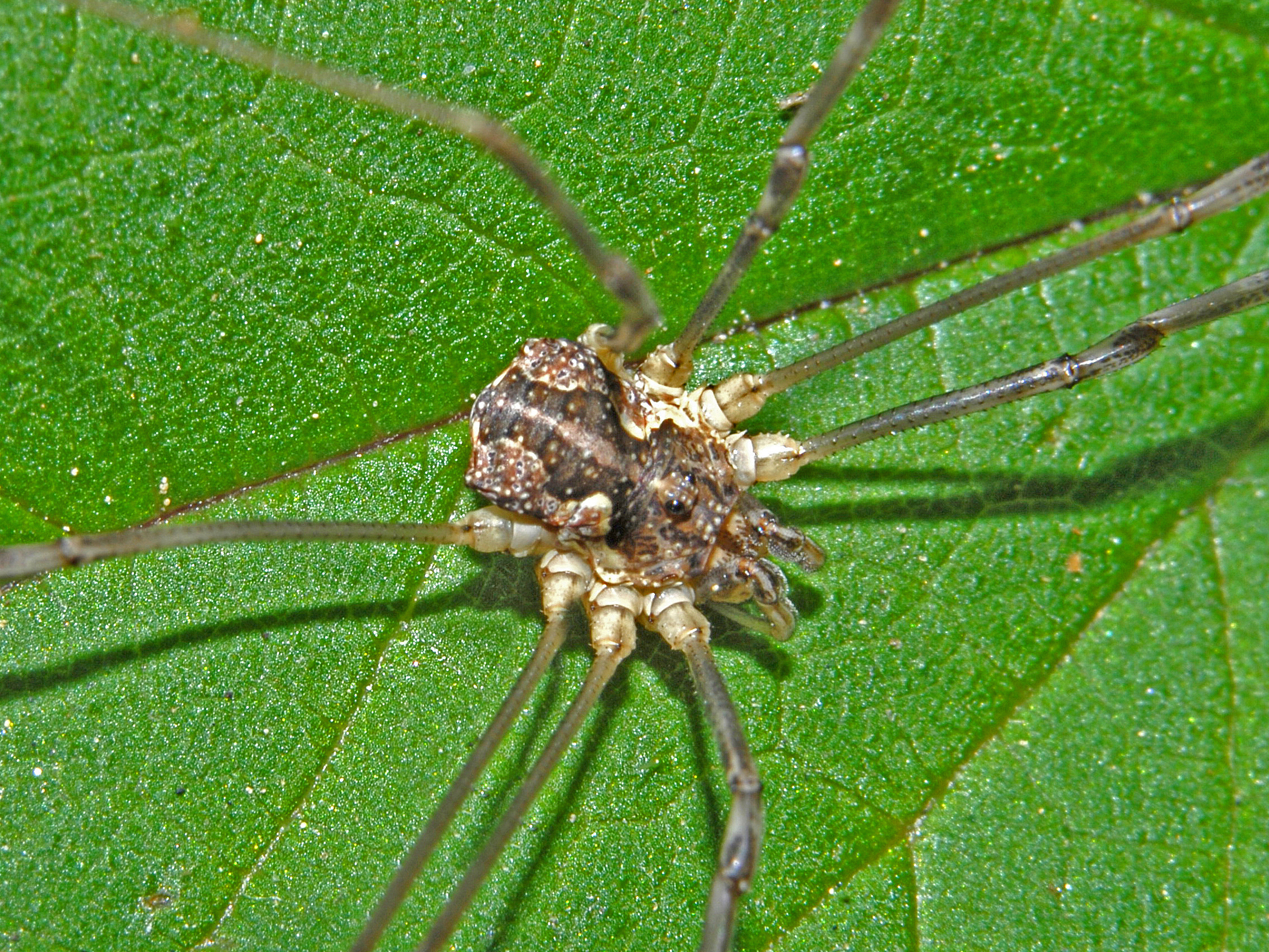
- Dasylobus argentatus

Scientific classification
- Kingdom: Animalia
- Phylum: Arthropoda
- Subphylum: Chelicerata
- Class: Arachnida
- Order: Opiliones
- Family: Phalangiidae
- Genus: Dasylobus; Simon, 1878

= Dasylobus =

Genus of harvestmen/daddy longlegs

Dasylobus is a genus of harvestmen in the family Phalangiidae.

== Species ==
- Dasylobus arcadius (Roewer, 1956)
- Dasylobus argentatus (Canestrini, 1871)
- Dasylobus australis Simon, 1899 [See *Note]
- Dasylobus beschkovi (Starega, 1976)
- Dasylobus corsicus (Roewer, 1956)
- Dasylobus cyrenaicus (Caporaccio, 1937b)
- Dasylobus egaenoides Simon, 1885
- Dasylobus eremita Simon, 1878
- Dasylobus ferrugineus (Thorell, 1876)
- Dasylobus fuscus (Roewer, 1911)
- Dasylobus gestroi (Thorell, 1876)
- Dasylobus graniferus (Canestrini, 1871)
- Dasylobus insignitus (Roewer, 1912)
- Dasylobus insularis (Roewer, 1956)
- Dasylobus kulczynskii Nosek, 1905
- Dasylobus laevigatus (L.Koch, 1867)
- Dasylobus nivicola Simon, 1879
- Dasylobus rondaensis (Kraus, 1959)
- Dasylobus samniticus Lerma, 1952
- Note: Described from New Zealand, Chatham Islands, yet placed in a Palearctic genus. It is nomen dubium
