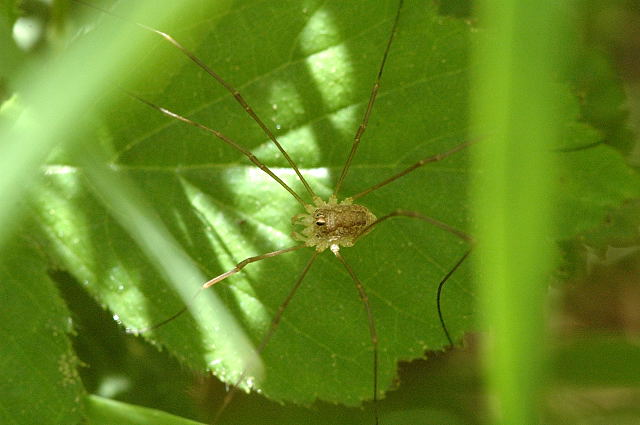

Scientific classification
- Kingdom: Animalia
- Phylum: Arthropoda
- Subphylum: Chelicerata
- Class: Arachnida
- Order: Opiliones
- Family: Phalangiidae
- Genus: Rilaena
- Species: R. triangularis

Binomial name
- Rilaena triangularis (Herbst, 1799)

Synonyms
- Opilio triangularis Platybunus triangularis Platybunus (Paraplatybunus) triangularis

= Rilaena triangularis =

Species of harvestman/daddy longlegs

Rilaena triangularis is a species of the harvestman family Phalangiidae. Previously it has been considered to be in the genus and subgenus Platybunus (Paraplatybunus) Dumitrescu, 1970, in the subfamily Platybuninae. Caution is needed with the name "Paraplatybunus". Although claimed as a potential genus in many online sources, the generic rank does not appear to have any foundation in the underlying academic literature, but instead was only published as a subgenus.

== Description ==
Rilaena triangularis is a harvestman with a broad natural distribution across Europe. This species was first described by Johann Friedrich Wilhelm Herbst in 1799, initially as Phalangium triangularis. It was later renamed through recombination in multiple forms but including Platybunus (Paraplatybunus) triangularis (Herbst, 1799) in Dumitrescu, 1970. The triangularis portion of its name (the species epithet) can be attributed to its "saddle pattern" on the upper (dorsal) surface, typically featuring a slightly darker triangular - or vase-shaped - "saddle" marking. That is often outlined with a lighter, whitish or pale-yellow colour.

=== Chemical defense ===
When disturbed, Rilaena triangularis emits a strong-smelling secretion as a chemical defense. This fluid contains 1,4-benzoquinone, 1,4-naphthoquinone and caprylic acid.

== Range ==
Occurrences of Rilaena triangularis have been recorded and aggregated in GBIF across Europe, with the exception of Spain and Portugal. It has also been observed in north-west and north-east corners of the United States.

== Habitat ==
The species thrives in forests, floodplain forests and fens.
