= Paralacinius =

Paralacinius podoliensis

Scientific classification
- Domain: Eukaryota
- Kingdom: Animalia
- Phylum: Arthropoda
- Subphylum: Chelicerata
- Class: Arachnida
- Order: Opiliones
- Family: Phalangiidae
- Genus: Paralacinius; Morin, 1934
- Species: P. podoliensis

Binomial name
- Paralacinius podoliensis Morin, 1934

Genus of harvestmen/daddy longlegs

Paralacinius podoliensis is a species of harvestmen in a monotypic genus in the family Phalangiidae.
