= Liropilio =

Scientific classification
- Domain: Eukaryota
- Kingdom: Animalia
- Phylum: Arthropoda
- Subphylum: Chelicerata
- Class: Arachnida
- Order: Opiliones
- Family: Phalangiidae
- Genus: Liropilio; N. I. Gritsenko, 1979

Genus of harvestmen/daddy longlegs

Liropilio is a genus of harvestmen in the family Phalangiidae.

== Species ==
- Liropilio przhevalskii N. I. Gritsenko, 1979
- Liropilio stukanovi N. I. Gritsenko, 1979
