= Coptophalangium =

Scientific classification
- Domain: Eukaryota
- Kingdom: Animalia
- Phylum: Arthropoda
- Subphylum: Chelicerata
- Class: Arachnida
- Order: Opiliones
- Family: Phalangiidae
- Genus: Coptophalangium; W. Starega, 1984
- Species: C. buniger

Binomial name
- Coptophalangium buniger (Roewer, 1956)

Genus of harvestmen/daddy longlegs

Coptophalangium buniger is a species of harvestmen in a monotypic genus in the family Phalangiidae.
