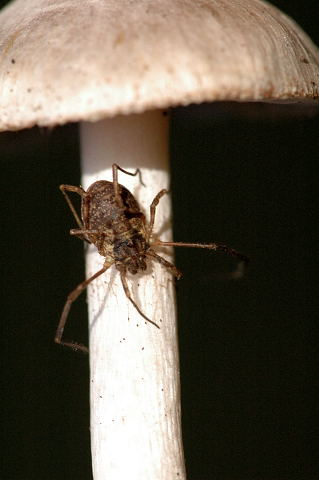
- O. tridens

Scientific classification
- Domain: Eukaryota
- Kingdom: Animalia
- Phylum: Arthropoda
- Subphylum: Chelicerata
- Class: Arachnida
- Order: Opiliones
- Family: Phalangiidae
- Genus: Oligolophus; L. Koch, 1871

Type species
- Opilio tridens C. L. Koch, 1836

Species
- See text.

Diversity
- 4 species

= Oligolophus =

Genus of harvestmen/daddy longlegs

Oligolophus is a genus of the harvestman family Phalangiidae.

== Species ==
- Oligolophus mollis L. Koch (unidentifiable)
- Oligolophus hansenii (Kraepelin, 1896) (Denmark)
- Oligolophus tridens (C. L. Koch, 1836) (central Europe)
- Oligolophus tienmushanensis Wang, 1941 (China)
