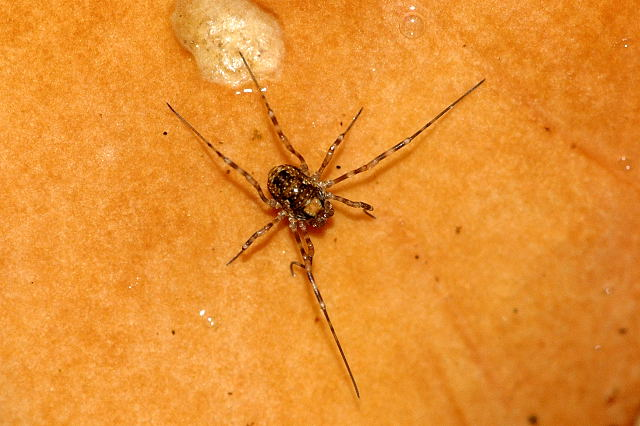
- Platybunus

Scientific classification
- Kingdom: Animalia
- Phylum: Arthropoda
- Subphylum: Chelicerata
- Class: Arachnida
- Order: Opiliones
- Superfamily: Phalangioidea
- Family: Phalangiidae; Latreille, 1802

Genera
- Dicranopalpus; Megabunus; Mitopus; Oligolophus; Opilio; Paroligolophus; Phalangium; Rilaena; others, see list

Diversity
- 5 subfamilies, ca. 50 genera

= Phalangiidae =

Phalangiidae Temporal range: Palaeogene–present

Family of harvestmen/daddy longlegs

The Phalangiidae are a family of harvestmen with about 380 known species. The best known is Phalangium opilio. Dicranopalpus ramosus is a common introduced species in Europe.

It is not to be confused with the harvestman family Phalangodidae, which belongs to the suborder Laniatores.

== Name ==
The name of the type genus is derived from Ancient Greek phalangion "harvestman".

== Systematics ==
- Dicranopalpinae

- Amilenus Martens, 1969 (1 species; central Europe)
- Dicranopalpus Doleschall, 1852 (12 species; Europe, South America)

- Oligolophinae Banks, 1893

- Lacinius Thorell, 1876 (17 species; China, Europe, North America)
- Mitopiella Banks, 1930 (1 species; Borneo)
- Mitopus Thorell, 1876 (9 species; Eurasia, North America)
- Odiellus Roewer, 1923 (17 species; Eurasia, North Africa, North America)
- Oligolophus C. L. Koch, 1871 (4 species; Europe, China)
- Paralacinius Morin, 1934 (1 species)
- Paroligolophus Lohmander, 1945 (2 species; continental Europe and Britain)
- Roeweritta Silhavý, 1965 (1 species)

- Opilioninae C.L. Koch, 1839

- Egaenus C.L. Koch, in Hahn & C.L. Koch 1839 (14 species; Eurasia)
- Himalphalangium Martens, 1973 (5 species)
- Homolophus Banks, 1893 (25 species; central Asia, North America)
- Opilio Herbst, 1798 (63 species; Eurasia, one species also in North America)
- Scleropilio Roewer, 1911 (1 species; central Asia)

- Phalangiinae Latreille, 1802

- Bactrophalangium Silhavý, 1966 (2 species)
- Bunochelis Roewer, 1923 (2 species; Canary Islands)
- Coptophalangium Starega, 1984 (1 species)
- Cristina Loman, 1902 (13 species; Africa)
- Dacnopilio Roewer, 1911 (4 species; Africa)
- Dasylobus Simon, 1878 (19 species; southern Europe, northern Africa)
- Graecophalangium Roewer, 1923 (5 species; Greece, Macedonia)
- Guruia Loman, 1902 (5 species; Africa)
- Hindreus Kauri, 1985 (3 species; Africa)
- Leptobunus Banks, 1893 (5 species; North America)
- Liopilio Schenkel, 1951 (2 species; Alaska)
- Liropilio Gritsenko, 1979 (2 species; Russia, Kazakhstan)
- Megistobunus Hansen, 1921 (3 species)
- Metadasylobus Roewer, 1911 (8 species; Balkans, Greece, Canary Islands, France, Spain)
- Metaphalangium Roewer, 1911 (15 species; southern Europe, northern Africa, Asia Minor, Canary Islands)
- Odontobunus Roewer, 1910 (9 species; Africa)
- Parascleropilio Rambla, 1975 (1 species)
- Phalangium Linnaeus, 1758 (35 species; Africa, Eurasia, Cuba)
- Ramblinus Starega, 1984 (1 species; Madeira)
- Rhampsinitus Simon, 1879 (47 species; Africa)
- Rilaena Silhavý, 1965 (8 species; Europe)
- Tchapinius Roewer, 1929 (1 species; Kamchatka)
- Zachaeus C.L. Koch, 1839 (10 species; southeastern Europe, Asia Minor)

- Platybuninae Starega, 1976

- Acanthomegabunus Tsurusaki, Tchemeris & Logunov, 2000 (1 species; Siberia)
- Buresilia Silhavý, 1965 (4 species; West Asia)
- Lophopilio Hadzi, 1931 (2 species)
- Megabunus Meade, 1855 (6 species; Europe)
- Metaplatybunus Roewer, 1911 (8 species; Greece)
- Paraplatybunus Dumitrescu, 1970 (2 species)
- Platybunoides Silhavý, 1956 (1 species)
- Platybunus C.L. Koch, 1839 (22 species; Europe, Sumatra)
- Rafalskia Starega, 1963 (1 species; Asia minor)
- Stankiella Hadzi, 1973 (2 species)
