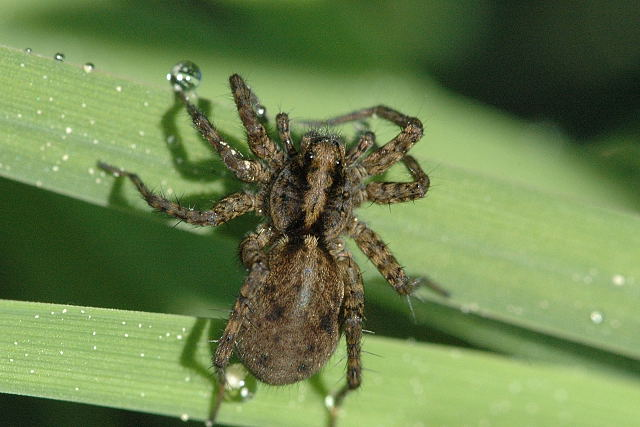
- female Pardosa agricola.

Scientific classification
- Kingdom: Animalia
- Phylum: Arthropoda
- Subphylum: Chelicerata
- Class: Arachnida
- Order: Araneae
- Infraorder: Araneomorphae
- Family: Lycosidae
- Genus: Pardosa
- Species: P. agricola

Binomial name
- Pardosa agricola (Thorell, 1856)

Subspecies
- Pardosa agricola borussica (Dahl, 1908) — Lithuania; Pardosa agricola fucicola (Dahl, 1908) — Finland, Germany

= Pardosa agricola =

Species of spider

Pardosa agricola is a wolf spider species in the genus Pardosa found from Europe to Kazakhstan .
