= Pardosa elegans =

Scientific classification
- Kingdom: Animalia
- Phylum: Arthropoda
- Subphylum: Chelicerata
- Class: Arachnida
- Order: Araneae
- Infraorder: Araneomorphae
- Family: Lycosidae
- Genus: Pardosa
- Species: P. elegans

Binomial name
- Pardosa elegans (Thorell, 1875)

Synonyms
- Lycosa elegans Thorell, 1875

Species of wolf spider

Pardosa elegans is a species of wolf spiders (family Lycosidae) found in Russia.
