= Pardosa baehrorum =

Scientific classification
- Kingdom: Animalia
- Phylum: Arthropoda
- Subphylum: Chelicerata
- Class: Arachnida
- Order: Araneae
- Infraorder: Araneomorphae
- Family: Lycosidae
- Genus: Pardosa
- Species: P. baehrorum

Binomial name
- Pardosa baehrorum Kronestedt, 1999

Species of spider

Pardosa baehrorum is a wolf spider species in the genus Pardosa found in Germany, Switzerland, and Austria.
