= Pardosa occidentalis =

Scientific classification
- Kingdom: Animalia
- Phylum: Arthropoda
- Subphylum: Chelicerata
- Class: Arachnida
- Order: Araneae
- Infraorder: Araneomorphae
- Family: Lycosidae
- Genus: Pardosa
- Species: P. occidentalis

Binomial name
- Pardosa occidentalis Simon, 1881

Species of spider

Pardosa occidentalis is a wolf spider species found in Portugal, France and Sardinia.
