= Pardosa maisa =

Scientific classification
- Kingdom: Animalia
- Phylum: Arthropoda
- Subphylum: Chelicerata
- Class: Arachnida
- Order: Araneae
- Infraorder: Araneomorphae
- Family: Lycosidae
- Genus: Pardosa
- Species: P. maisa

Binomial name
- Pardosa maisa Hippa & Mannila, 1982

Species of spider

Pardosa maisa is a wolf spider species in the genus Pardosa found in Finland, Austria, Hungary, Czech Republic, Poland and Russia.
