= Pardosa timidula =

Scientific classification
- Kingdom: Animalia
- Phylum: Arthropoda
- Subphylum: Chelicerata
- Class: Arachnida
- Order: Araneae
- Infraorder: Araneomorphae
- Family: Lycosidae
- Genus: Pardosa
- Species: P. timidula

Binomial name
- Pardosa timidula (Roewer, 1951)

Species of spider

Pardosa timidula, is a species of spider of the genus Pardosa. It is native to Pakistan, Sri Lanka and Yemen.
