= Pardosa danica =

Scientific classification
- Kingdom: Animalia
- Phylum: Arthropoda
- Subphylum: Chelicerata
- Class: Arachnida
- Order: Araneae
- Infraorder: Araneomorphae
- Family: Lycosidae
- Genus: Pardosa
- Species: P. danica

Binomial name
- Pardosa danica (Sørensen, 1904)

Synonyms
- Lycosa danica

Species of spider

Pardosa danica is a wolf spider species known from only a single specimen collected in Mols Bjerge, Denmark. It was collected by Danish arachnologist William Sørensen in 1883. He described it as a new species in 1904, under the name Lycosa danica. The type specimen is in the collection of the Copenhagen Zoological Museum. The exact site where it was found, near the Bogensholm manor, was at the time covered in heathers, but is now overgrown with bushes and trees. The local area is among the best studied areas in Denmark with respect to terrestrial invertebrates, due to the nearby location of the field station of the Natural History Museum, Aarhus and as wolf spiders in general are conspicuous, it is a mystery why the species has never been found again. It is considered regionally extinct.
