= Pardosa injucunda =

Egypt Pardosa Wolf Spider

Scientific classification
- Kingdom: Animalia
- Phylum: Arthropoda
- Subphylum: Chelicerata
- Class: Arachnida
- Order: Araneae
- Infraorder: Araneomorphae
- Family: Lycosidae
- Genus: Pardosa
- Species: P. injucunda

Binomial name
- Pardosa injucunda (O. Pickard-Cambridge, 1876)

Synonyms
- Lycosa injucunda O. Pickard-Cambridge, 1876; Tarentula berndti Strand, 1913; Lycosa proximella ituria Strand, 1913; Lycosa feldmanni xanthippe Strand, 1916; Pardosa ganzania Roewer, 1959; Pardosa pelengea Roewer, 1959

Species of spider

Pardosa injucunda is a species of spider in the family Lycosidae. It is found in Africa and is commonly known as the Egypt Pardosa wolf spider.

== Distribution ==
Pardosa injucunda is found from Egypt to South Africa. In South Africa, the species is recorded from the provinces KwaZulu-Natal, Limpopo, North West, and Northern Cape at altitudes ranging from 982 to 2785 m.

== Habitat and ecology ==
Pardosa injucunda inhabits the Grassland and Savanna biomes. The species is a fast running ground spider found in a variety of habitats.

== Conservation ==
Pardosa injucunda is listed as Least Concern by the South African National Biodiversity Institute. There are no significant threats to the species and due to its wide geographical range, it is therefore listed as being of Least Concern. The species is protected in Benfontein Game Reserve and Tswalu Game Reserve.

== Taxonomy ==
Pardosa injucunda was originally described by O. Pickard-Cambridge in 1876 as Lycosa injucunda. The species was revised by Roewer in 1959 and is known from both sexes. Alderweireldt and Jocqué in 1992 synonymized several species with P. injucunda.
