= Pardosa umtalica =

Zimbabwe Pardosa Wolf Spider

Scientific classification
- Kingdom: Animalia
- Phylum: Arthropoda
- Subphylum: Chelicerata
- Class: Arachnida
- Order: Araneae
- Infraorder: Araneomorphae
- Family: Lycosidae
- Genus: Pardosa
- Species: P. umtalica

Binomial name
- Pardosa umtalica Purcell, 1903

Species of spider

Pardosa umtalica is a species of spider in the family Lycosidae. It is found in Africa and is commonly known as the Zimbabwe Pardosa wolf spider.

== Distribution ==
Pardosa umtalica is found in Tanzania, Zimbabwe, and South Africa. In South Africa, the species is recorded from two provinces at altitudes ranging from 907 to 1412 m, including Limpopo and Mpumalanga.

== Habitat and ecology ==
Pardosa umtalica is a fast running ground spider. It inhabits the Savanna biome and has also been sampled from cotton fields.

== Description ==
The carapace has broad black lateral bands with the yellow median band narrower. The submarginal yellow stripes are very broad and furnished with three black markings laterally. The lateral borders are narrowly blackened. The sternum is pale yellowish.

The abdomen is black with the ventral surface pale yellowish. The legs are pale yellowish or more or less darkly infuscated with black rings. In males, the carapace is blackened with a median yellowish band present but the submarginal bands are obsolete.

The leg femora are blackened, with the more distal segments pale yellowish and lightly infuscated in parts, not distinctly banded. The pedipalps are black with the tarsus pale yellowish distally, terminating in a strong black claw.

Total length in males is 3.25 mm and in females 4-4.5 mm.

== Conservation ==
Pardosa umtalica is listed as Least Concern by the South African National Biodiversity Institute. Due to its wide geographical range, it is therefore listed as being of Least Concern. There are no significant threats to the species and it is protected in Lhuvhondo Nature Reserve.

== Taxonomy ==
Pardosa umtalica was described by Purcell in 1903 from Zimbabwe. The species was revised by Roewer in 1959 and is known from both sexes.
