= Pardosa leipoldti =

Leipoldt's Pardosa Wolf Spider

Scientific classification
- Kingdom: Animalia
- Phylum: Arthropoda
- Subphylum: Chelicerata
- Class: Arachnida
- Order: Araneae
- Infraorder: Araneomorphae
- Family: Lycosidae
- Genus: Pardosa
- Species: P. leipoldti

Binomial name
- Pardosa leipoldti Purcell, 1903

Species of spider

Pardosa leipoldti is a species of spider in the family Lycosidae. It is found in southern Africa and is commonly known as Leipoldt's Pardosa wolf spider.

== Distribution ==
Pardosa leipoldti is found in Zimbabwe and South Africa. In South Africa, it is recorded from the provinces Gauteng, KwaZulu-Natal, Limpopo, and Western Cape at altitudes ranging from 78 to 1730 m.

== Habitat and ecology ==
Pardosa leipoldti inhabits the Fynbos, Grassland, Nama Karoo, and Savanna biomes. The species is a fast running ground spider found in a variety of habitats.

== Conservation ==
Pardosa leipoldti is listed as Least Concern by the South African National Biodiversity Institute. There are no significant threats to the species and due to its wide distribution range, it is therefore listed as Least Concern. It is protected in several nature reserves including Klipriviersberg Nature Reserve, Hluhluwe Nature Reserve, Lhuvhondo Nature Reserve, Polokwane Nature Reserve, Blouberg Nature Reserve, and Lekgalameetse Nature Reserve.

== Taxonomy ==
Pardosa leipoldti was described by Purcell in 1903 from Clanwilliam. The species was revised by Roewer in 1959 and is known from both sexes.
