= Pardosa diuturna =

Conservation status
- Vulnerable (IUCN 2.3)

- Secure (NatureServe)

Scientific classification
- Kingdom: Animalia
- Phylum: Arthropoda
- Subphylum: Chelicerata
- Class: Arachnida
- Order: Araneae
- Infraorder: Araneomorphae
- Family: Lycosidae
- Genus: Pardosa
- Species: P. diuturna

Binomial name
- Pardosa diuturna Fox, 1937

Species of spider

Pardosa diuturna, also known as the Glacier Bay wolf spider, is a species of spider in the family Lycosidae. It is endemic to Canada and Alaska.
