= Pardosa poecila =

Scientific classification
- Kingdom: Animalia
- Phylum: Arthropoda
- Subphylum: Chelicerata
- Class: Arachnida
- Order: Araneae
- Infraorder: Araneomorphae
- Family: Lycosidae
- Genus: Pardosa
- Species: P. poecila

Binomial name
- Pardosa poecila (Herman, 1879)

Species of spider

Pardosa is a wolf spider species in the genus Pardosa, first described in 1879 and found in Hungary.
