= Pardosa roscai =

Scientific classification
- Kingdom: Animalia
- Phylum: Arthropoda
- Subphylum: Chelicerata
- Class: Arachnida
- Order: Araneae
- Infraorder: Araneomorphae
- Family: Lycosidae
- Genus: Pardosa
- Species: P. roscai

Binomial name
- Pardosa roscai (Roewer, 1951)

Species of spider

Pardosa roscai is a wolf spider species in the genus Pardosa found in Bulgaria, Romania and Turkey.
