= Pardosa ogudovi =

Scientific classification
- Kingdom: Animalia
- Phylum: Arthropoda
- Subphylum: Chelicerata
- Class: Arachnida
- Order: Araneae
- Infraorder: Araneomorphae
- Family: Lycosidae
- Genus: Pardosa
- Species: P. ogudovi

Binomial name
- Pardosa ogudovi Fomichev, 2022

Species of spider

Pardosa ogudovi is a species of spider in the family Lycosidae. It is native to Russia.
