= Pardosa ludia =

Scientific classification
- Kingdom: Animalia
- Phylum: Arthropoda
- Subphylum: Chelicerata
- Class: Arachnida
- Order: Araneae
- Infraorder: Araneomorphae
- Family: Lycosidae
- Genus: Pardosa
- Species: P. ludia

Binomial name
- Pardosa ludia Szüts & Jocqué, 2001

Species of spider

Pardosa ludia is a species of spider in the genus Pardosa, family Lycosidae. It is endemic to Myanmar. It was described for the first time by Thorell, in 1895.
