= Pardosa clavipalpis =

Scientific classification
- Kingdom: Animalia
- Phylum: Arthropoda
- Subphylum: Chelicerata
- Class: Arachnida
- Order: Araneae
- Infraorder: Araneomorphae
- Family: Lycosidae
- Genus: Pardosa
- Species: P. clavipalpis

Binomial name
- Pardosa clavipalpis Purcell, 1903

Species of spider

Pardosa clavipalpis is an African species of spider in the family Lycosidae.

== Distribution ==
Pardosa clavipalpis is found in East Africa, Botswana, and South Africa. In South Africa, it is known from the provinces Limpopo, Mpumalanga, Northern Cape, North West, and Western Cape.

== Habitat and ecology ==
Pardosa clavipalpis inhabits the Fynbos, Grassland, Nama Karoo, and Savanna biomes at altitudes ranging from 7 to 1349 m. These are free-running ground dwellers. The species has also been sampled in crops such as maize.

== Conservation ==
Pardosa clavipalpis is listed as Least Concern by the South African National Biodiversity Institute. Due to its wide geographical range, it is therefore listed as being of Least Concern. There are no known threats, and the species is protected in the Fernkloof Nature Reserve.

== Taxonomy ==
Pardosa clavipalpis was originally described by Purcell in 1903 from Cape Town. The species has not been revised and is known from both sexes.
