= Pardosa nostrorum =

Fanies Islands Pardosa Wolf Spider

Scientific classification
- Kingdom: Animalia
- Phylum: Arthropoda
- Subphylum: Chelicerata
- Class: Arachnida
- Order: Araneae
- Infraorder: Araneomorphae
- Family: Lycosidae
- Genus: Pardosa
- Species: P. nostrorum

Binomial name
- Pardosa nostrorum Alderweireldt & Jocqué, 1992

Species of spider

Pardosa nostrorum is a species of spider in the family Lycosidae. It is found in southern Africa and is commonly known as the Fanies Islands Pardosa wolf spider.

== Distribution ==
Pardosa nostrorum is found in Mozambique and South Africa. In South Africa, it is recorded in the provinces Eastern Cape and KwaZulu-Natal at altitudes ranging from 4 to 7 m.

== Habitat and ecology ==
Pardosa nostrorum inhabits the Savanna and Thicket biomes. The species is a fast running ground spider found in a variety of habitats.

== Conservation ==
Pardosa nostrorum is listed as Least Concern by the South African National Biodiversity Institute. Due to its wide geographical range, it is therefore listed as being of Last Concern. There are no significant threats to the species and it is protected in Dwesa Nature Reserve and iSimangaliso Wetland Park.

== Taxonomy ==
Pardosa nostrorum was described by Alderweireldt and Jocqué in 1992 from Fanie's Island in KwaZulu-Natal. The species is known from both sexes.
