= Pardosa yavapa =

Scientific classification
- Kingdom: Animalia
- Phylum: Arthropoda
- Subphylum: Chelicerata
- Class: Arachnida
- Order: Araneae
- Infraorder: Araneomorphae
- Family: Lycosidae
- Genus: Pardosa
- Species: P. yavapa

Binomial name
- Pardosa yavapa Chamberlin, 1925

Species of spider

Pardosa yavapa is a species of wolf spider in the family Lycosidae. It is found in the United States.
