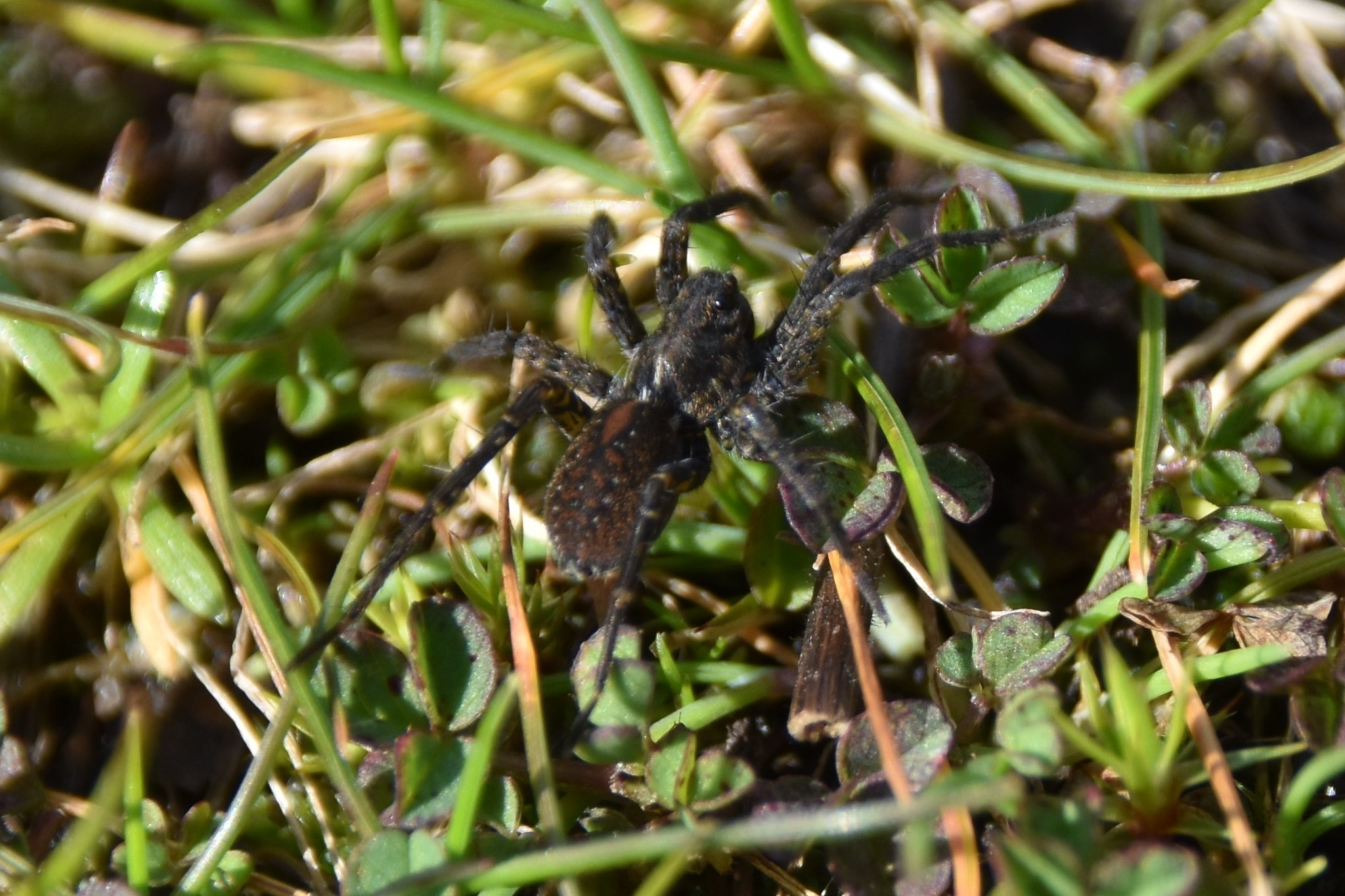

Scientific classification
- Domain: Eukaryota
- Kingdom: Animalia
- Phylum: Arthropoda
- Subphylum: Chelicerata
- Class: Arachnida
- Order: Araneae
- Infraorder: Araneomorphae
- Family: Lycosidae
- Genus: Pardosa
- Species: P. vancouveri

Binomial name
- Pardosa vancouveri Emerton, 1917

= Pardosa vancouveri =

Species of spider

Pardosa vancouveri is a species of wolf spider in the family Lycosidae. It is found in the United States and Canada.
