= Pardosa semicana =

Scientific classification
- Kingdom: Animalia
- Phylum: Arthropoda
- Subphylum: Chelicerata
- Class: Arachnida
- Order: Araneae
- Infraorder: Araneomorphae
- Family: Lycosidae
- Genus: Pardosa
- Species: P. semicana

Binomial name
- Pardosa semicana Simon, 1885

Species of spider

Pardosa semicana is a species of spider of the genus Pardosa. It is native to China, Malaysia and Sri Lanka.
