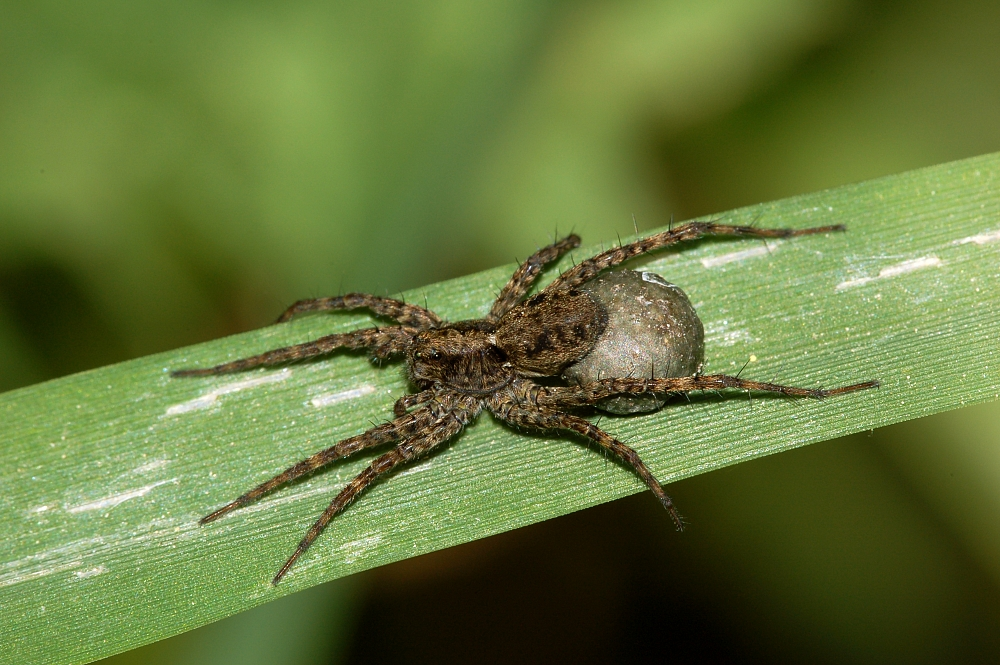
- Pardosa lugubris in Mörfelden, Hesse, Germany

Scientific classification
- Kingdom: Animalia
- Phylum: Arthropoda
- Subphylum: Chelicerata
- Class: Arachnida
- Order: Araneae
- Infraorder: Araneomorphae
- Family: Lycosidae
- Genus: Pardosa
- Species: P. lugubris

Binomial name
- Pardosa lugubris (Walckenaer, 1802)

Synonyms
- Aranea lugubris Walckenaer, 1802; Pardosa barndti Wunderlich, 1969; Pardosa lugubris — Simon, 1876

= Pardosa lugubris =

Species of spider

Pardosa lugubris is a wolf spider species with Palearctic distribution.

== Habitat ==
The species is commonly found at forest edges and in woodland clearings. It also occurs in fens and bogs.

== Description ==
Females have a reddish brown carapace with a wide, lighter median band. Their median ocular area is covered with white hairs. Lateral bands are visible, but indistinct, becoming more evident towards the posterior. Females typically range between 4.8-7.0 mm.

Males have a dark brown carapace, with a light median band that is reddish in the cephalic region and yellowish in the thoracic region. Their ocular area and median band are covered with white hairs. They have no visible lateral bands. The abdomen is reddish brown with a yellow-red pattern. Male palpus have brown segments covered with black hairs. Males typically range between 4.6-5.0 mm.
