= Pardosa mackenziana =

Scientific classification
- Domain: Eukaryota
- Kingdom: Animalia
- Phylum: Arthropoda
- Subphylum: Chelicerata
- Class: Arachnida
- Order: Araneae
- Infraorder: Araneomorphae
- Family: Lycosidae
- Genus: Pardosa
- Species: P. mackenziana

Binomial name
- Pardosa mackenziana (Keyserling, 1877)

Species of spider

Pardosa mackenziana is a species of wolf spider in the family Lycosidae. It is found in the United States and Canada.
