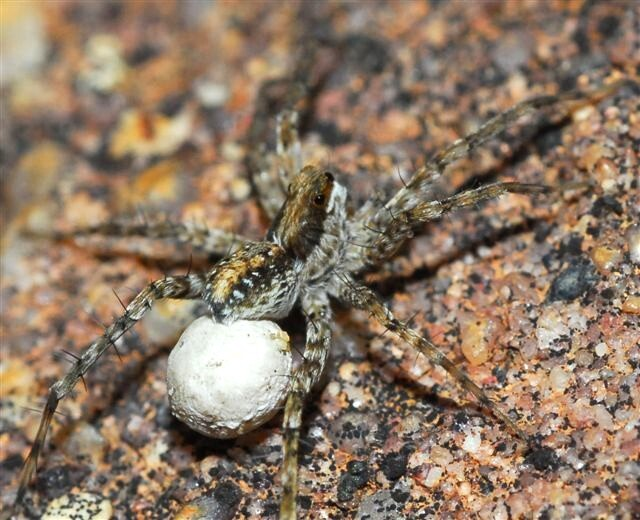
- Female
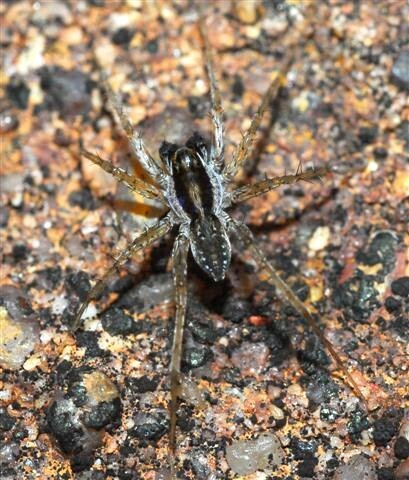
- Male

Scientific classification
- Kingdom: Animalia
- Phylum: Arthropoda
- Subphylum: Chelicerata
- Class: Arachnida
- Order: Araneae
- Infraorder: Araneomorphae
- Family: Lycosidae
- Genus: Pardosa
- Species: P. schreineri

Binomial name
- Pardosa schreineri Purcell, 1903

= Pardosa schreineri =

Schreineri's Pardosa Wolf Spider

Species of spider

Pardosa schreineri is a species of spider in the family Lycosidae. It is found in southern Africa and is commonly known as Schreineri's Pardosa wolf spider.

== Distribution ==
Pardosa schreineri is found in Namibia, Botswana, and South Africa.

In South Africa, it is recorded from the provinces Eastern Cape, Gauteng, KwaZulu-Natal, and Northern Cape at altitudes ranging from 47 to 1531 m.

== Habitat and ecology ==
Pardosa schreineri inhabits the Grassland, Nama Karoo, and Savanna biomes. The species is a fast running ground spider found in a variety of habitats.

== Description ==
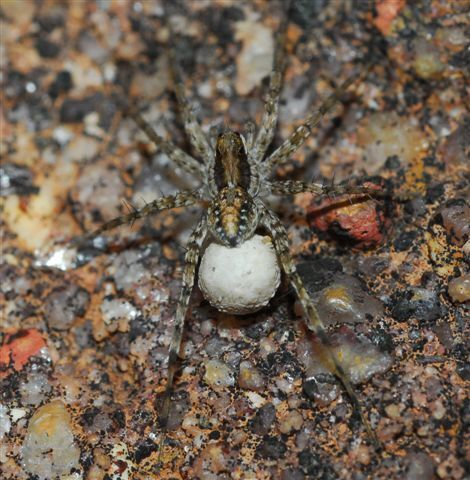
female with egg sac

== Conservation ==
Pardosa schreineri is listed as Least Concern by the South African National Biodiversity Institute. Due to its wide geographical range, it is therefore listed as Least Concern. There are no significant threats to the species and it is recorded from two protected areas, Ndumo Game Reserve and Tsolwane Nature Reserve.

== Etymology ==
The species is named after S. C. Cronwright Schreiner, who collected specimens for Purcell.

== Taxonomy ==
Pardosa schreineri was described by Purcell in 1903 from De Aar. The species was revised by Roewer in 1959 and is known from both sexes.
