= Pardosa lycosina =

Dunbrody Pardosa Wolf Spider

Scientific classification
- Kingdom: Animalia
- Phylum: Arthropoda
- Subphylum: Chelicerata
- Class: Arachnida
- Order: Araneae
- Infraorder: Araneomorphae
- Family: Lycosidae
- Genus: Pardosa
- Species: P. lycosina

Binomial name
- Pardosa lycosina Purcell, 1903

Species of spider

Pardosa lycosina is a species of spider in the family Lycosidae. It is endemic to South Africa and is commonly known as the Dunbrody Pardosa wolf spider.

== Distribution ==
Pardosa lycosina is found in South Africa. In South Africa, the species is recorded from the provinces Eastern Cape and Western Cape at altitudes ranging from 60 to 175 m.

== Habitat and ecology ==
Pardosa lycosina inhabits the Fynbos and Thicket biomes. The species is a fast running ground spider found in a variety of habitats.

== Conservation ==
Pardosa lycosina is listed as Data Deficient for Taxonomic reasons by the South African National Biodiversity Institute. The status of the species remains obscure and additional sampling is needed to collect the male and to determine the species' range. The species could be threatened by loss due to farming activities in the three localities.

== Taxonomy ==
Pardosa lycosina was described by Purcell in 1903 from Dunbrody. The species was revised by Roewer in 1959 and is known only from the female.
