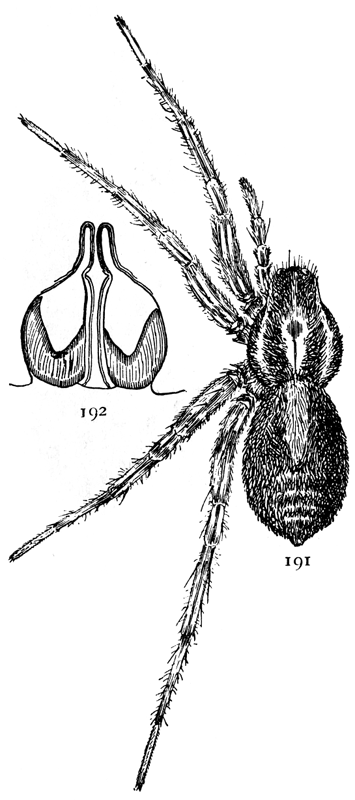

Scientific classification
- Kingdom: Animalia
- Phylum: Arthropoda
- Subphylum: Chelicerata
- Class: Arachnida
- Order: Araneae
- Infraorder: Araneomorphae
- Family: Lycosidae
- Genus: Pardosa
- Species: P. glacialis

Binomial name
- Pardosa glacialis (Thorell, 1872)

= Arctic wolf spider =

Species of spider

The Arctic wolf spider (Pardosa glacialis) is a type of wolf spider in the genus Pardosa, with a holarctic distribution and endemic to the Arctic, particularly Greenland.

== Description ==
The Arctic wolf spider can live for at least two years, grows as long as 1.6 inches (4 centimeters), and is a carnivore.

A 10-year study of the Arctic wolf spider revealed that the exoskeleton thickness averaged 0.104 inch (2.65 millimeters), a 2 percent increase over the 0.102 inch (2.6 millimeters) commonly found in the early years of the study, possibly the result of longer summers. Larger adult females may increase spider populations as larger females produce larger and greater numbers of offspring. This species is cannibalistic, and as adults grow they will devour spiderlings as prey, keeping the population in check.

Research suggests that when earlier snowmelt occurs in higher arctic site, Pardosa glacialis produces its first clutch earlier and its second clutch generally occurs later in the summer. The offspring in the first clutch will depend on the size of the female wolf spider, but the second clutch size does not depend on the body size of its parent.
