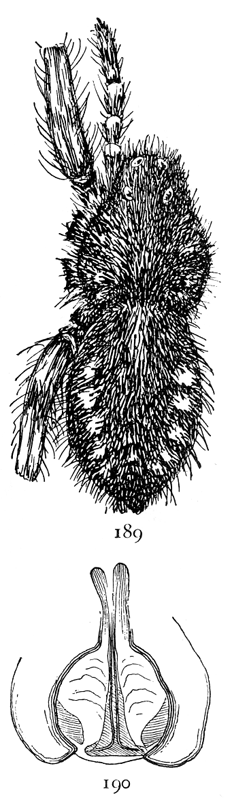

Scientific classification
- Kingdom: Animalia
- Phylum: Arthropoda
- Subphylum: Chelicerata
- Class: Arachnida
- Order: Araneae
- Infraorder: Araneomorphae
- Family: Lycosidae
- Genus: Pardosa
- Species: P. groenlandica

Binomial name
- Pardosa groenlandica (Thorell, 1872)

= Pardosa groenlandica =

Species of spider

Pardosa groenlandica also known as the Greenland Wolf Spider is a species of wolf spider in the family Lycosidae. It is found in Russia, Canada, the United States, and Greenland.
