= Pardosa tesquorum =

Scientific classification
- Domain: Eukaryota
- Kingdom: Animalia
- Phylum: Arthropoda
- Subphylum: Chelicerata
- Class: Arachnida
- Order: Araneae
- Infraorder: Araneomorphae
- Family: Lycosidae
- Genus: Pardosa
- Species: P. tesquorum

Binomial name
- Pardosa tesquorum (Odenwall, 1901)

Species of spider

Pardosa tesquorum is a spider in the genus Pardosa ("thinlegged wolf spiders"), in the family Lycosidae ("wolf spiders"). The distribution range of Pardosa tesquorum includes Russia, Mongolia, China, the US, and Canada.
