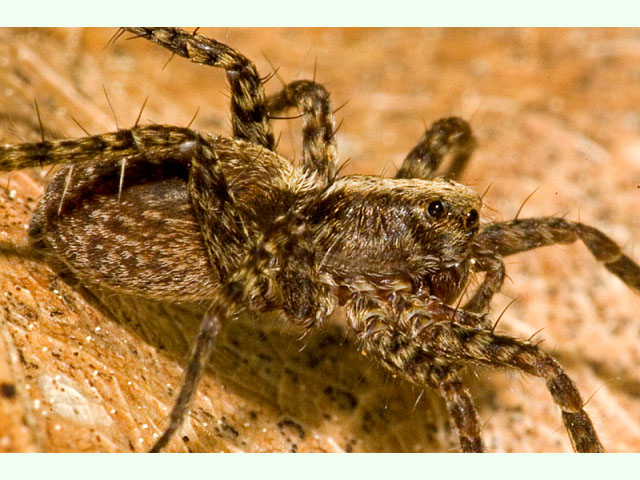

Scientific classification
- Kingdom: Animalia
- Phylum: Arthropoda
- Subphylum: Chelicerata
- Class: Arachnida
- Order: Araneae
- Infraorder: Araneomorphae
- Family: Lycosidae
- Genus: Pardosa
- Species: P. proxima

Binomial name
- Pardosa proxima (C. L. Koch, 1847)

Subspecies
- Pardosa proxima annulatoides (Strand, 1915) — Israel; Pardosa proxima antoni (Strand, 1915) — Israel; Pardosa proxima poetica Simon, 1876 — Portugal, Spain, France

= Pardosa proxima =

Species of spider

Pardosa proxima is a wolf spider species with a distribution of "Macaronesia, Europe, Russia, China".
