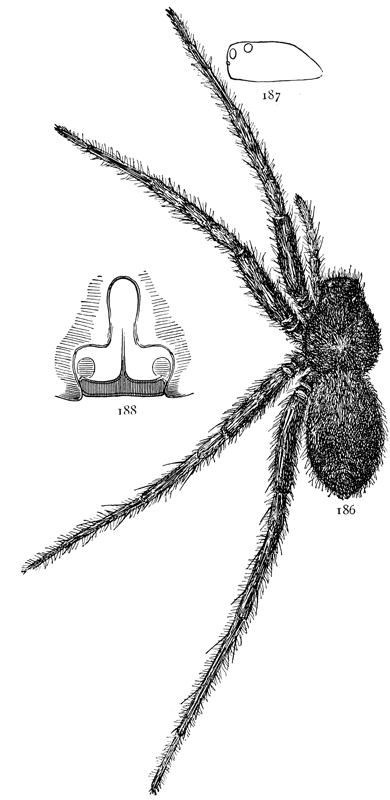

Scientific classification
- Domain: Eukaryota
- Kingdom: Animalia
- Phylum: Arthropoda
- Subphylum: Chelicerata
- Class: Arachnida
- Order: Araneae
- Infraorder: Araneomorphae
- Family: Lycosidae
- Genus: Pardosa
- Species: P. lapidicina

Binomial name
- Pardosa lapidicina Emerton, 1885

= Pardosa lapidicina =

Species of spider

Pardosa lapidicina, the stone spider, is a species of wolf spider in the family Lycosidae.

Location: It is found in the United States and Canada. primary near water.

Description: Around 6-9 mm, dark-colored wolf spider, 30-70 mg in size when fully matured.

A study by Douglass Morse at Brown University focused in on the wolf spider Pardosa lapidicina studied their behavior, observing the species was commonly found on cobble beaches above the tide line about Narragansett Bay, Rhode Island, USA and studied migration patterns among the tidelines. The species size was found to be 30 individuals/0.5 m along the shoreline; making them a common spider in this area. Their migration patterns showed they stayed close to the beach, during winter months (April-November). However in warmer months a third of the population moves with diurnal tides. The stone spider occupies both the open beach in addition to the beach with salt-marsh grass. They maintain a sit-and-wait strategy which sun-basking frequently, capturing more than one prey per day. Their diet also includes Diptera, Collembola, and amphipods.

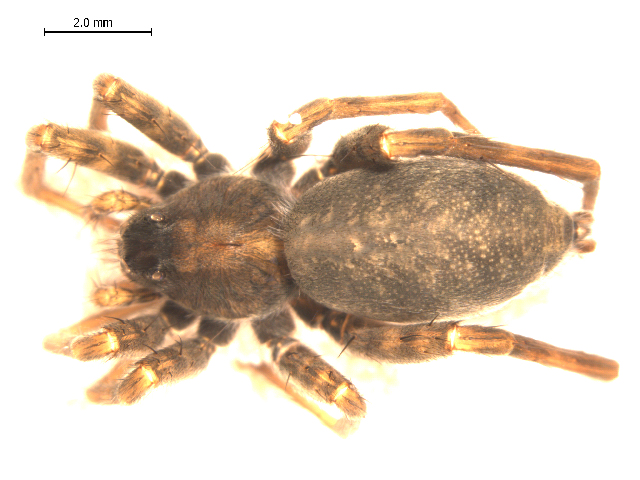
Stone spider, Pardosa lapidicina
