= Pardosa profuga =

Scientific classification
- Kingdom: Animalia
- Phylum: Arthropoda
- Subphylum: Chelicerata
- Class: Arachnida
- Order: Araneae
- Infraorder: Araneomorphae
- Family: Lycosidae
- Genus: Pardosa
- Species: P. profuga

Binomial name
- Pardosa profuga (Herman, 1879)

Species of spider

Pardosa profuga is a wolf spider species in the genus Pardosa found in Hungary.
