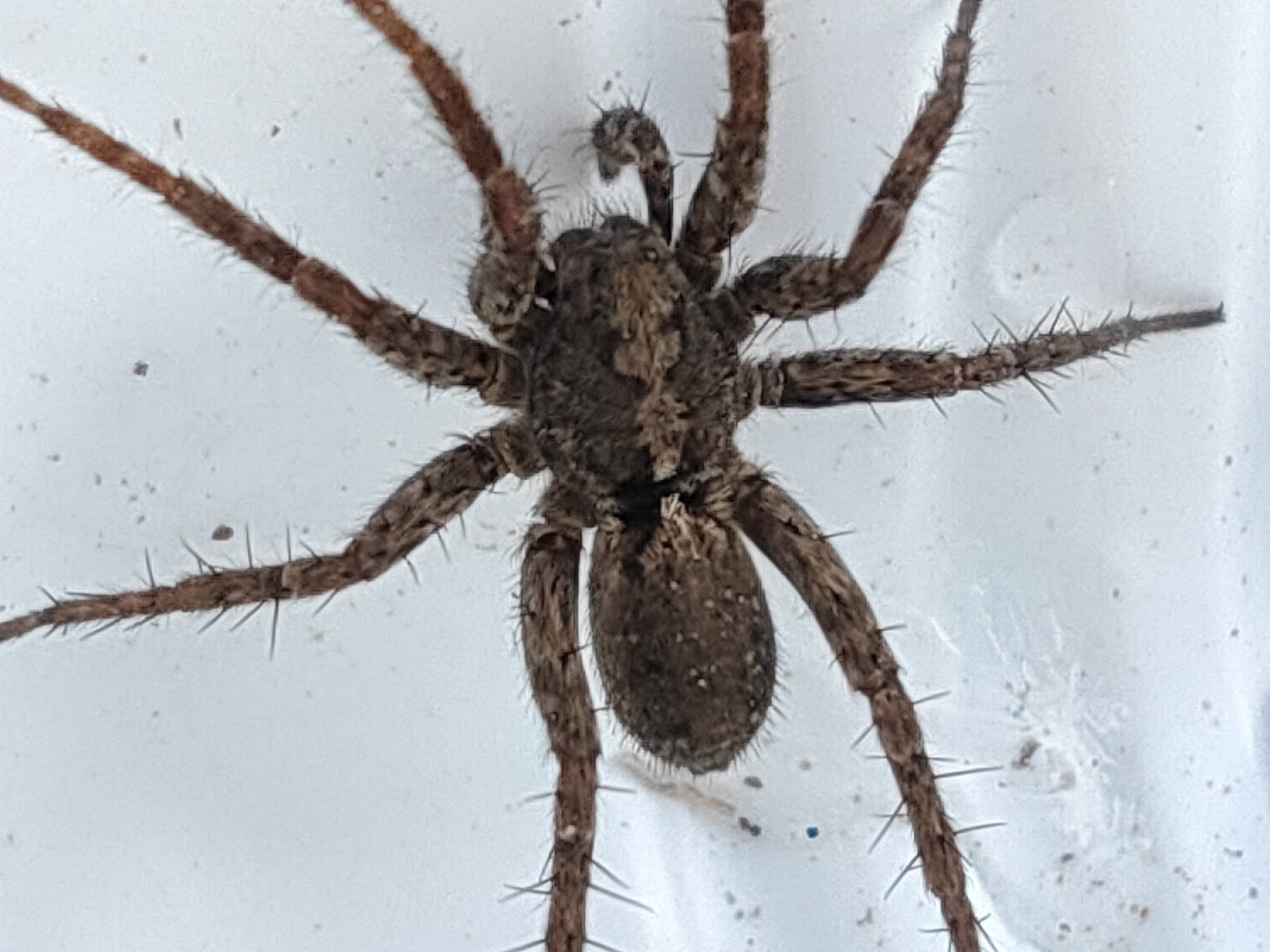

Scientific classification
- Kingdom: Animalia
- Phylum: Arthropoda
- Subphylum: Chelicerata
- Class: Arachnida
- Order: Araneae
- Infraorder: Araneomorphae
- Family: Lycosidae
- Genus: Pardosa
- Species: P. astrigera

Binomial name
- Pardosa astrigera Koch, 1878

Synonyms
- Lycosa astrigera Bösenberg & Strand, 1906; Lycosa T-insignita Bösenberg & Strand, 1906; Tarentula phila Dönitz & Strand, in Bösenberg & Strand, 1906; Lycosa cinereofusca Dönitz & Strand, in Bösenberg & Strand, 1906; Lycosa sagibia Strand, 1918; Pirata aomorensis Saitō, 1939; Pardosa cinereofusca Roewer, 1955; Pardosa sagibia Roewer, 1955; Pardosa T-insignita Roewer, 1955; Avicosa aomorensis Roewer, 1955; Lycosa philia Roewer, 1955; Pardosa pseudochionophila Schenkel, 1963; Pardosa fiusignita Wang, 1981

= Pardosa astrigera =

Species of wolf spider

Pardosa astrigera is a species of wolf spider in the family Lycosidae. They are found throughout Japan, Korea, China, Taiwan, and far east Russia.

== Description ==
Pardosa astrigera is a small wolf spider with the body length ranging between 6–10 mm (0.24–0.39 in) for females and 5–9 mm (0.20–0.35 in) for males. The cephalothorax varies from blackish-brown to yellowish-brown with a distinct median dorsal stripe running the length of the carapace. White setae are typically present on the pedicel. The sternum is blackish-brown. The abdomen varies from blackish-brown to yellowish-brown, with a subdued brownish-yellow longitudinal dorsal stripe. There is a high degree of variation in the dorsal pattern on the abdomen, however the typical presentation includes several thin lateral chevrons and 5 pairs of spots along the margins. The ventral side of the abdomen is yellowish-brown with a blackish-brown middle.

=== Identification ===
Descriptive diagnostic features with illustrations can be found in Koch 1878, Saitō 1939, and Namkung 2003. Diagnostic photographs are provided in Baba and Tanikawa 2015.

==== Visual Identification ====
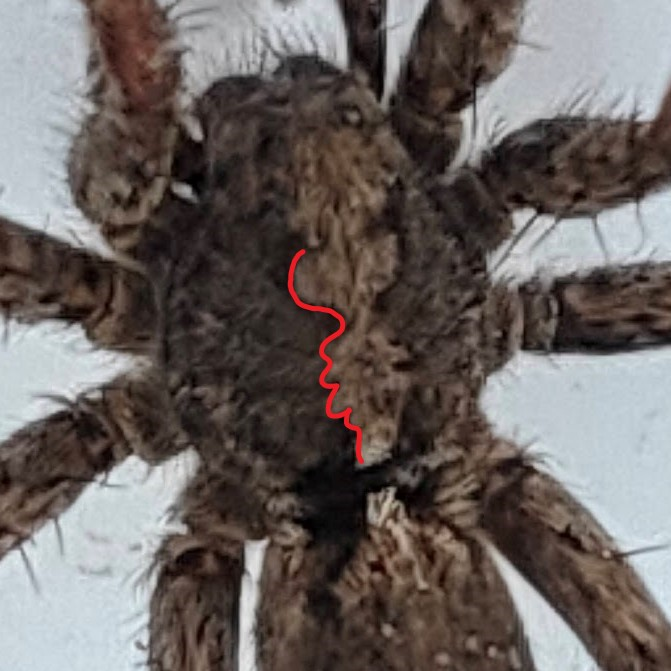
Unique median dorsal stripe on the carapace of Pardosa astrigera.

Pardosa astrigera is one of the few spiders that can be identified at a glance, as these spiders have a unique longitudinal band on the median of the carapace. The band is yellowish-brown in color, rounded behind the eyes, forming a star shape around the fovea, and narrowing as it reaches the abdomen.

== Habitat ==
Pardosa astrigera have been found on plains, mountains, paddy fields, open grasslands, riverbanks, and other areas. They are often found in relatively dry regions.

== Seasonality ==
Adult males and females can be found from spring to autumn.
