= Pardosa hyperborea =

Scientific classification
- Kingdom: Animalia
- Phylum: Arthropoda
- Subphylum: Chelicerata
- Class: Arachnida
- Order: Araneae
- Infraorder: Araneomorphae
- Family: Lycosidae
- Genus: Pardosa
- Species: P. hyperborea

Binomial name
- Pardosa hyperborea (Thorell, 1872)

Species of spider

Pardosa hyperborea is a species of wolf spiders in the family Lycosidae. It is found in North America, Greenland, Europe, and Russia (European to Siberia).
