= Pardosa subalpina =

Scientific classification
- Kingdom: Animalia
- Phylum: Arthropoda
- Subphylum: Chelicerata
- Class: Arachnida
- Order: Araneae
- Infraorder: Araneomorphae
- Family: Lycosidae
- Genus: Pardosa
- Species: P. subalpina

Binomial name
- Pardosa subalpina Schenkel, 1918

Species of spider

Pardosa subalpina is a species of wolf spider found in Switzerland.
