= Pardosa ramulosa =

Scientific classification
- Domain: Eukaryota
- Kingdom: Animalia
- Phylum: Arthropoda
- Subphylum: Chelicerata
- Class: Arachnida
- Order: Araneae
- Infraorder: Araneomorphae
- Family: Lycosidae
- Genus: Pardosa
- Species: P. ramulosa

Binomial name
- Pardosa ramulosa (McCook, 1894)

Species of spider

Pardosa ramulosa is a species of wolf spider in the family Lycosidae. It is found in the United States and Mexico. The spider feeds primarily on prey near salt marsh habitat, and requires a varied diet.
