= Pardosa vadosa =

Scientific classification
- Domain: Eukaryota
- Kingdom: Animalia
- Phylum: Arthropoda
- Subphylum: Chelicerata
- Class: Arachnida
- Order: Araneae
- Infraorder: Araneomorphae
- Family: Lycosidae
- Genus: Pardosa
- Species: P. vadosa

Binomial name
- Pardosa vadosa Barnes, 1959

Species of spider

Pardosa vadosa is a species of wolf spider in the family Lycosidae. It is found in the United States and Mexico.
