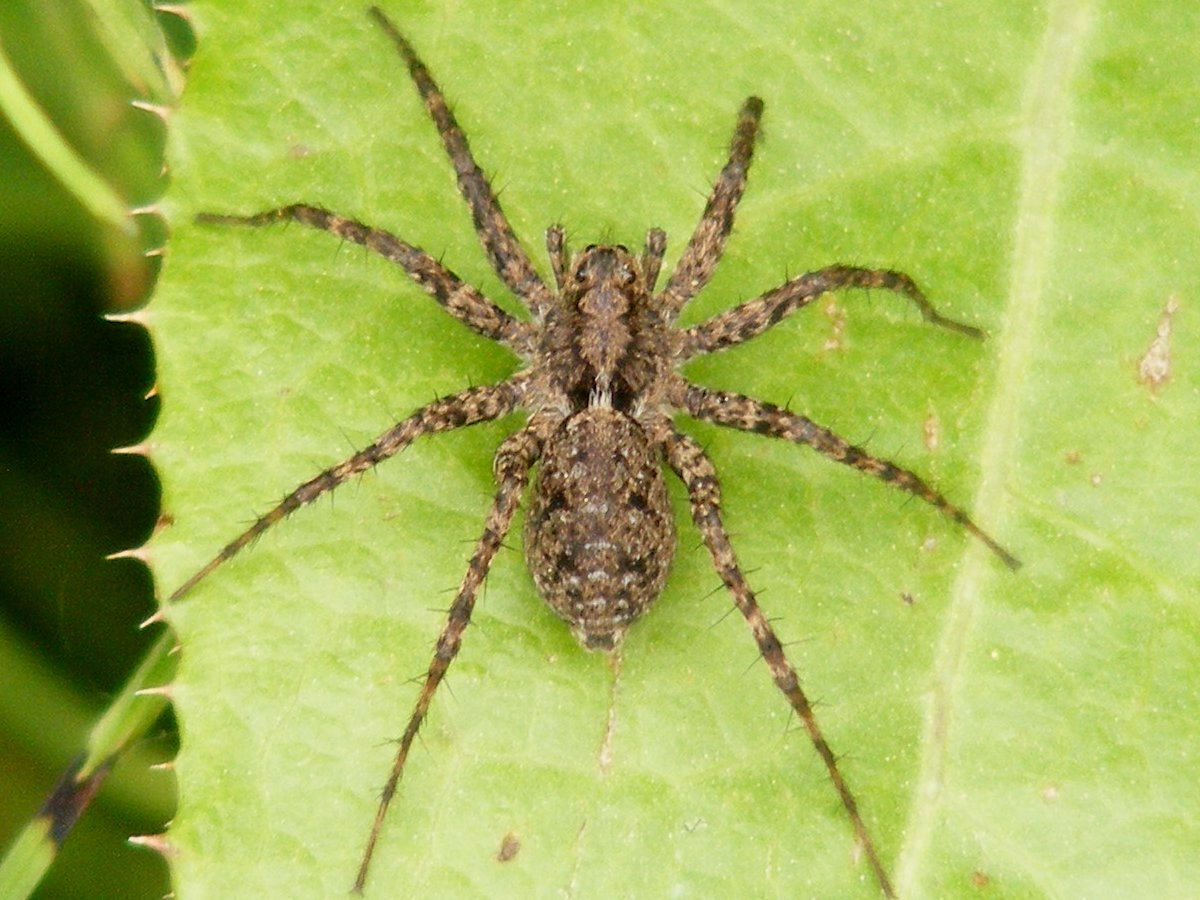
- Pardosa milvina
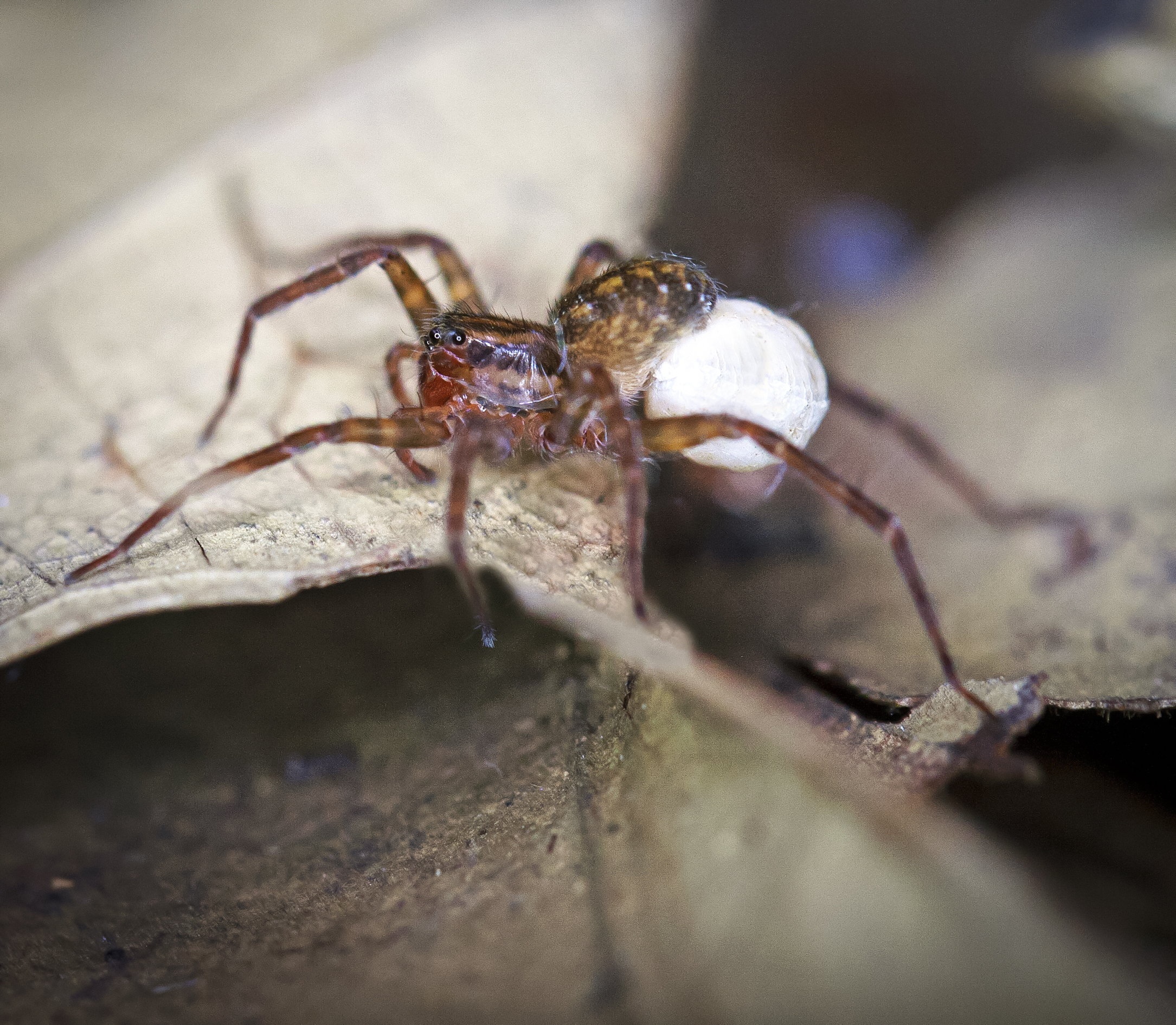
- Pardosa sp. with egg sac

Scientific classification
- Kingdom: Animalia
- Phylum: Arthropoda
- Subphylum: Chelicerata
- Class: Arachnida
- Order: Araneae
- Infraorder: Araneomorphae
- Family: Lycosidae
- Genus: Pardosa; C. L. Koch, 1847

Type species
- Lycosa alacris C. L. Koch, 1833

Species
- see text

Diversity
- > 500 species

= Pardosa =

Genus of spiders

Pardosa is a large genus of wolf spiders, commonly known as the thin-legged wolf spiders. It was first described by C. L. Koch, in 1847, with more than 500 described species that are found in most regions of the world.

== Distribution ==
Pardosa are found worldwide except Australia.

== Life style ==
These spiders are generally found in dry open woods as well as on wet ground near ponds and streams.

The egg-sac is lenticular, usually greenish when fresh and changing to dirty grey when older. Studies of P. crassipalpis found it to be a univoltine species with males passing through seven instars before reaching maturity and females through eight. During the reproductive phase, females produce an average of three egg sacs with an average of 23.3 eggs per sac.

== Description ==
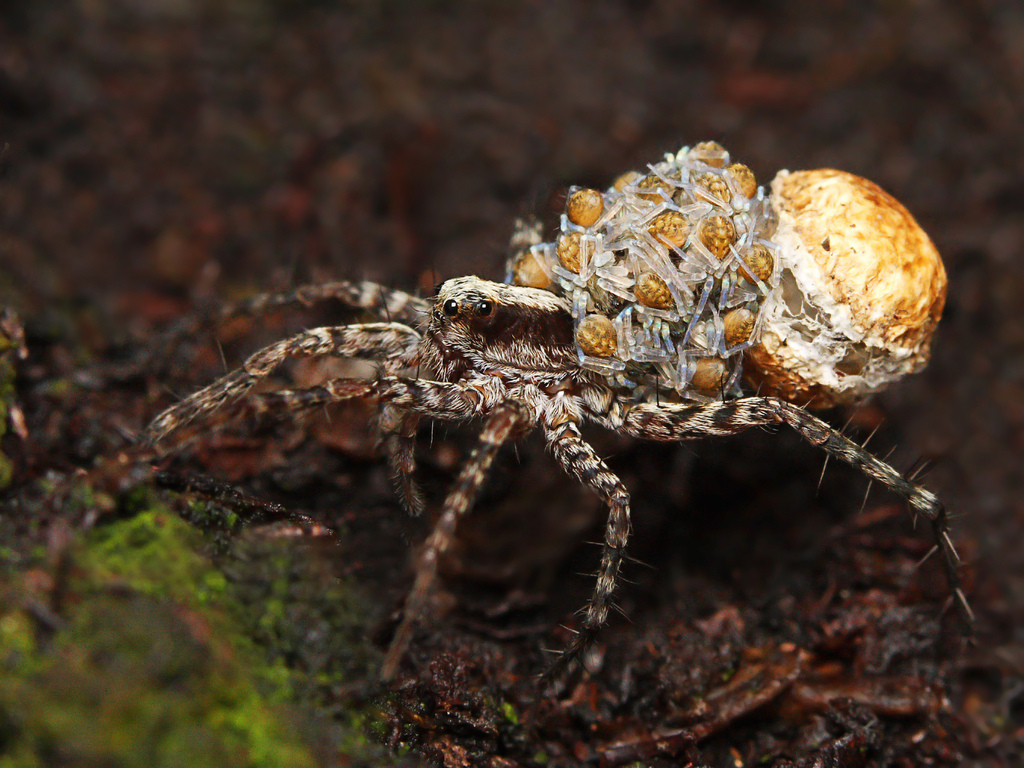
Pardosa sp. with spiderlings

Pardosa species are small to medium size wolf spiders, with a total length of 3-4 mm in males and 4-5 mm in females.

The cephalic region is elevated with clear median and lateral bands on the carapace. The clypeus is vertical and the chelicerae are much smaller than in most other lycosids, with their height less than the height of the head. The cephalic region is almost entirely occupied by the posterior two rows of eyes. The anterior row of eyes is shorter than the second row. The labium is usually wider than long with basal articular notches.

The legs are relatively long and thin and provided with long spines. Metatarsus IV is at least as long as the patella plus tibia together. Tibia I is provided with three pairs of ventral spines. In males of some species, the palp has dense dark setae.

== Species ==
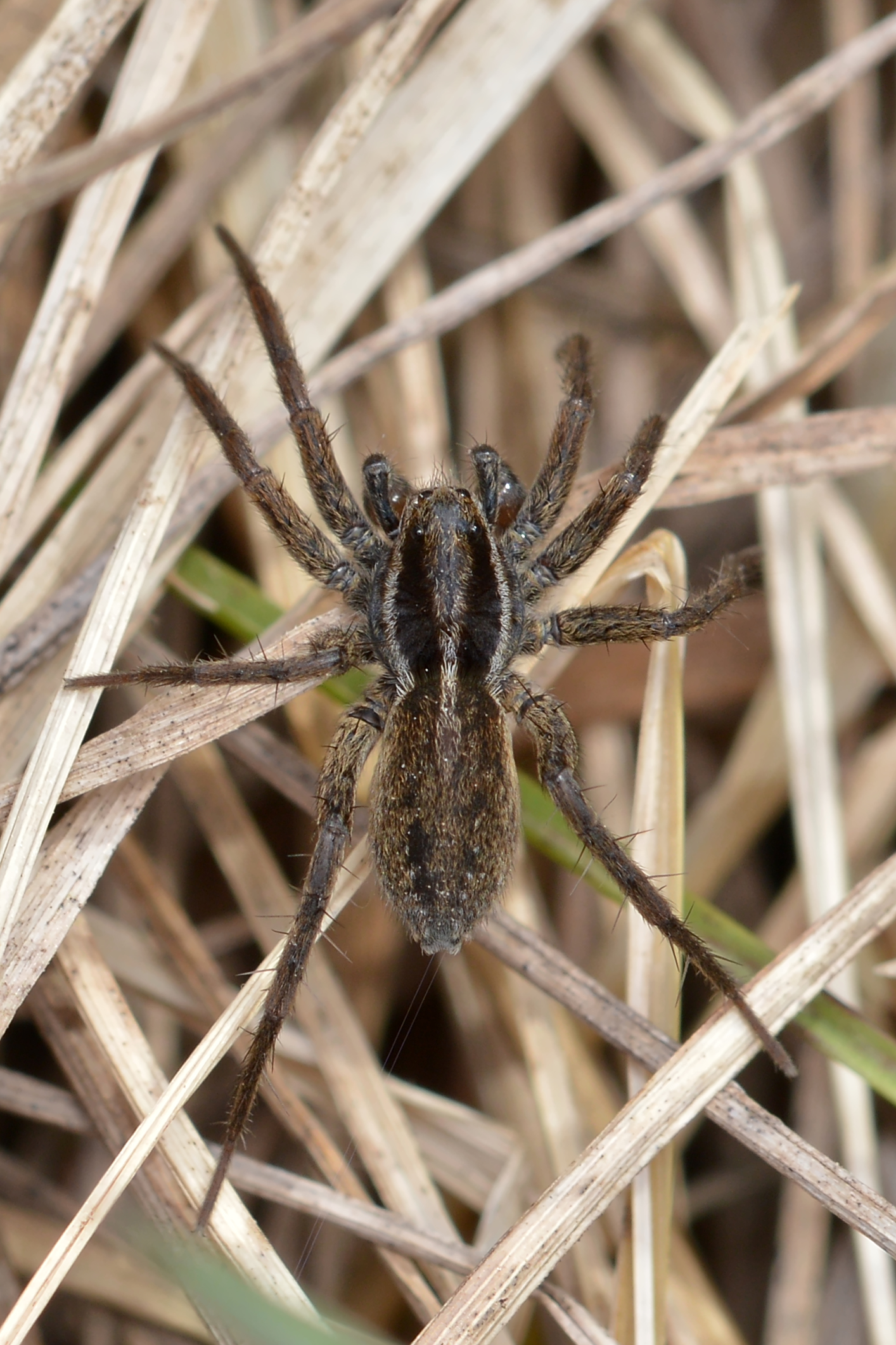
Pardosa modica

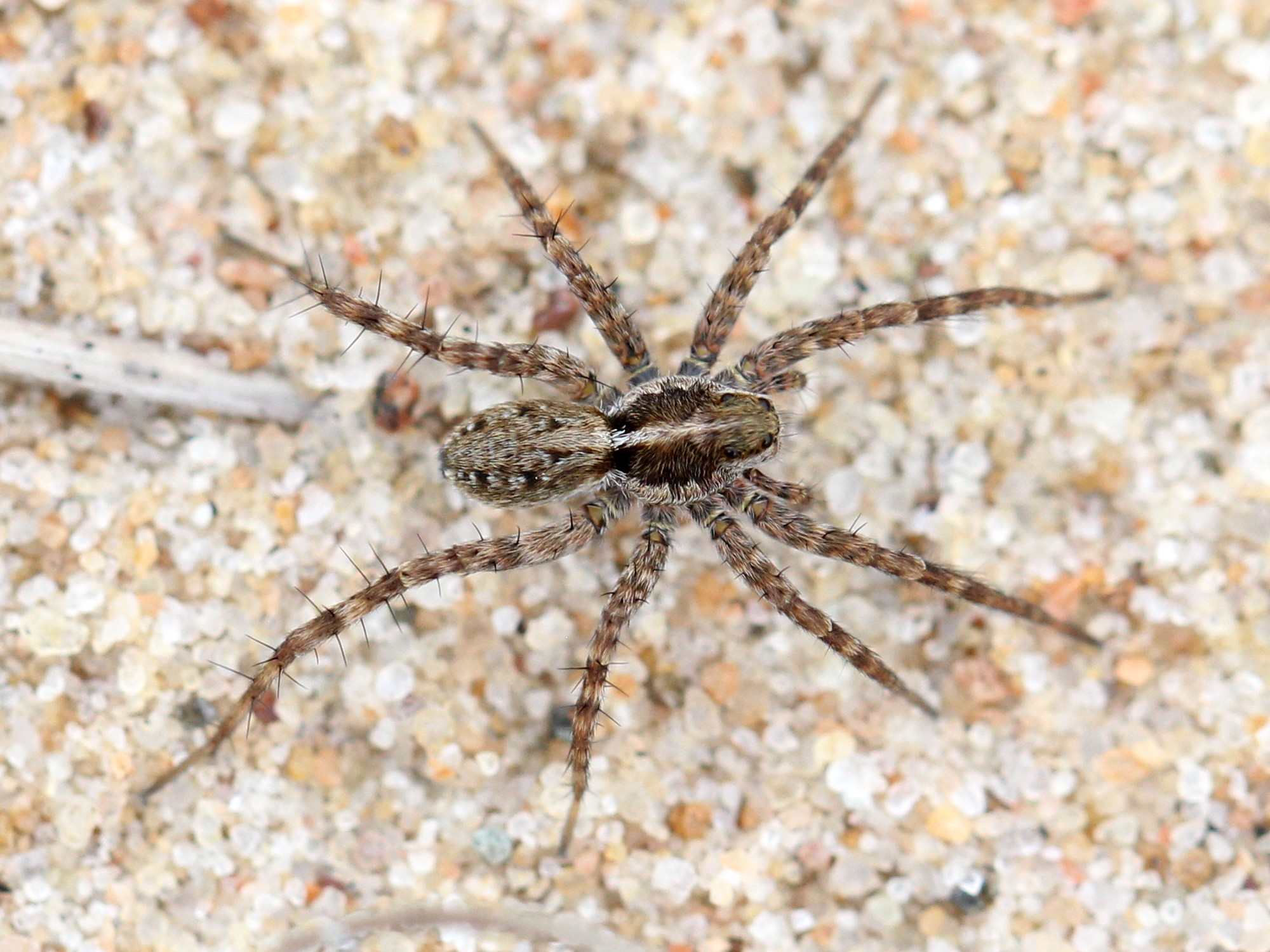
Pardosa monticola

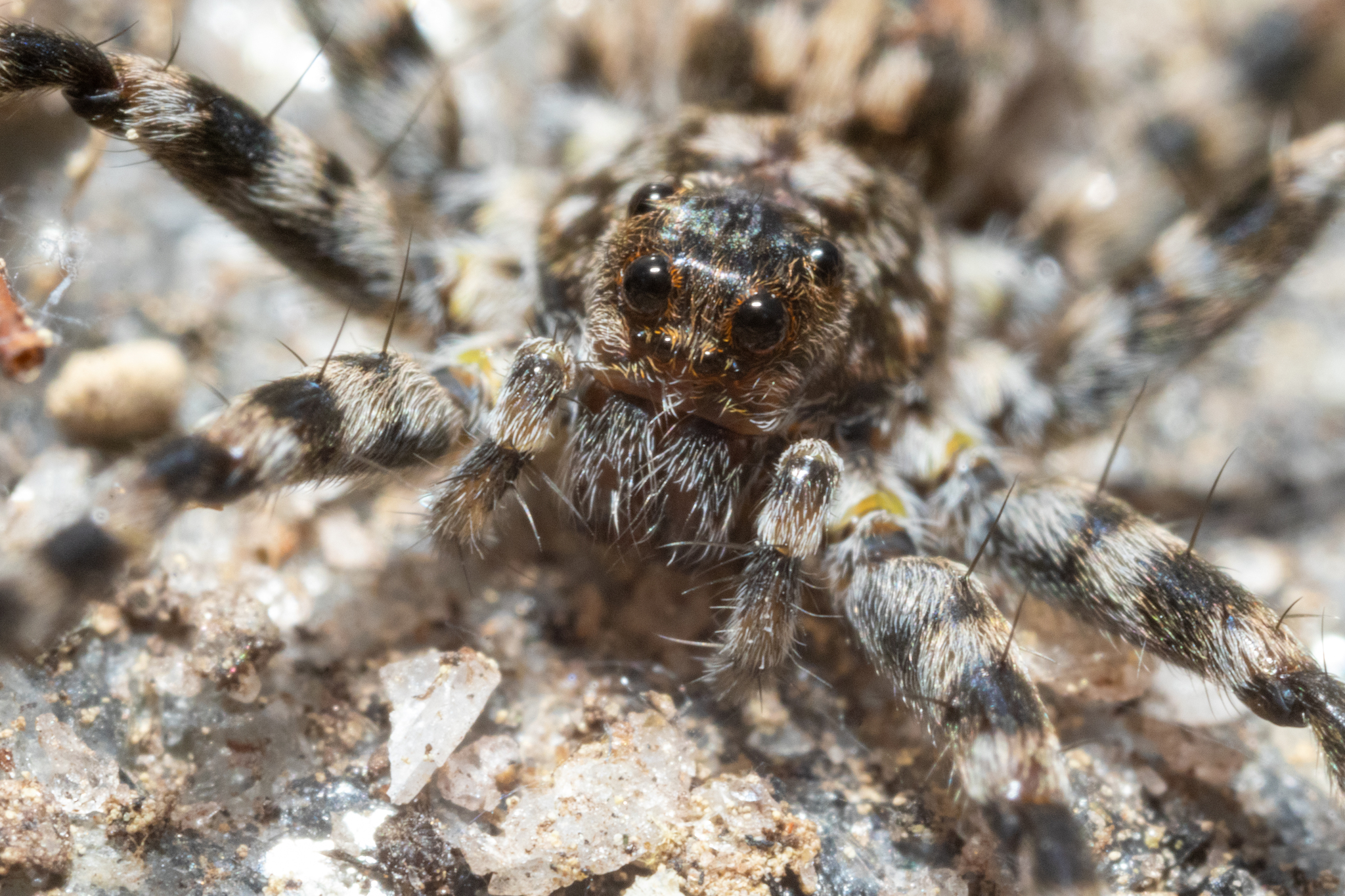
Pardosa lapidicina

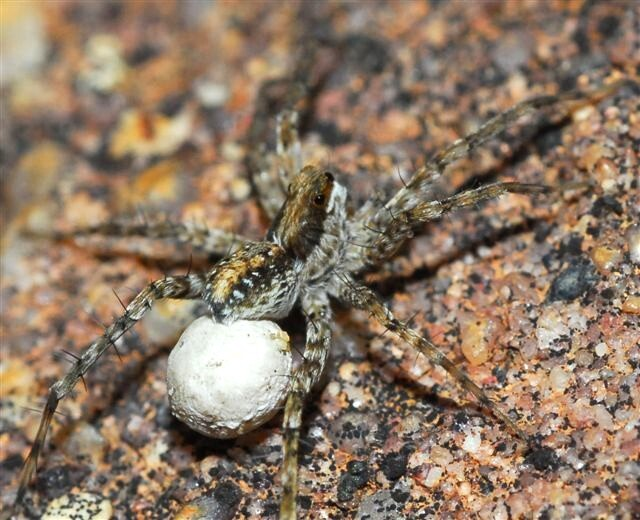
Pardosa schreineri

As of October 2025, this genus includes 503 species and fourteen subspecies.

Pardosa species with an article on Wikipedia:

- Pardosa agrestis (Westring, 1861) – Europe, Caucasus, Russia (Europe to Far East), Central Asia, China
- Pardosa agricola (Thorell, 1856) – Europe, Turkey, Caucasus, Russia (Europe to Middle Siberia), Kazakhstan
- Pardosa amentata (Clerck, 1757) – Europe, Turkey, Caucasus, Russia (Europe to South Siberia), Kazakhstan?
- Pardosa astrigera L. Koch, 1878 – Russia (Far East), Korea, Japan, China, Taiwan
- Pardosa atlantica Emerton, 1913 – United States
- Pardosa atromedia Banks, 1904 – United States
- Pardosa baehrorum Kronestedt, 1999 – Germany, Switzerland, Austria
- Pardosa californica Keyserling, 1887 – United States, Mexico
- Pardosa clavipalpis Purcell, 1903 – East Africa, Botswana, South Africa
- Pardosa danica (Sørensen, 1904) – Denmark
- Pardosa distincta (Blackwall, 1846) – Canada, United States
- Pardosa diuturna Fox, 1937 – Alaska, Canada
- Pardosa dorsuncata Lowrie & Dondale, 1981 – Alaska, Canada, United States
- Pardosa drenskii Buchar, 1968 – North Macedonia, Bulgaria, Greece
- Pardosa elegans (Thorell, 1875) – Russia (Europe)
- Pardosa fuscula (Thorell, 1875) – Alaska, Canada, United States
- Pardosa glacialis (Thorell, 1872) – Russia (Far North-East), Alaska, Canada, Greenland
- Pardosa groenlandica (Thorell, 1872) – Russia (Middle Siberia to Kamchatka), Alaska, Canada, United States, Greenland
- Pardosa hyperborea (Thorell, 1872) – North America, Greenland, Europe, Russia (Europe to South Siberia)
- Pardosa injucunda (O. Pickard-Cambridge, 1876) – Egypt to South Africa
- Pardosa lapidicina Emerton, 1885 – Canada, United States
- Pardosa laura Karsch, 1879 – Russia (Far East), Korea, Japan, China, Taiwan
- Pardosa leipoldti Purcell, 1903 – Zimbabwe, South Africa
- Pardosa lowriei Kronestedt, 1975 – Alaska, Canada, United States
- Pardosa ludia (Thorell, 1895) – Myanmar
- Pardosa lugubris (Walckenaer, 1802) – Europe, Turkey, Caucasus, Russia (Europe to South Siberia), Kazakhstan, Iran
- Pardosa lycosina Purcell, 1903 – South Africa
- Pardosa mackenziana (Keyserling, 1877) – Alaska, Canada, United States
- Pardosa maisa Hippa & Mannila, 1982 – Finland, Estonia, Central and eastern Europe, Russia (Urals, West Siberia)
- Pardosa mercurialis Montgomery, 1904 – United States
- Pardosa metlakatla Emerton, 1917 – Alaska, Canada, United States
- Pardosa milvina (Hentz, 1844) – Canada, United States
- Pardosa modica (Blackwall, 1846) – Canada, United States
- Pardosa moesta Banks, 1892 – Alaska, Canada, United States
- Pardosa monticola (Clerck, 1757) – Europe, Turkey, Georgia
- Pardosa nigriceps (Thorell, 1856) – Europe
- Pardosa nostrorum Alderweireldt & Jocqué, 1992 – Mozambique, South Africa
- Pardosa occidentalis Simon, 1881 – Portugal, Spain, France, Italy (Sardinia)
- Pardosa ontariensis Gertsch, 1933 – Canada, United States
- Pardosa orophila Gertsch, 1933 – United States, Mexico
- Pardosa pauxilla Montgomery, 1904 – United States
- Pardosa poecila (Herman, 1879) – Hungary
- Pardosa profuga (Herman, 1879) – Hungary
- Pardosa proxima (C. L. Koch, 1847) – Macaronesia, northern Africa, Europe, Caucasus, Russia (Europe to Far East), Kazakhstan, Iran, Central Asia, China
- Pardosa pseudoannulata (Bösenberg & Strand, 1906) – Pakistan, India, Nepal, Bhutan, China, Taiwan, Korea, Japan, Laos, Philippines, Indonesia (Java)
- Pardosa pseudostrigillata Tongiorgi, 1966 – Austria, Italy, Slovenia
- Pardosa pullata (Clerck, 1757) – Europe, Turkey, Caucasus, Russia (Europe to South Siberia), Kazakhstan, Central Asia
- Pardosa ramulosa (McCook, 1894) – United States, Mexico, Panama
- Pardosa roscai (Roewer, 1951) – Bulgaria, Romania, Cyprus, Turkey, Iraq, Iran
- Pardosa saxatilis (Hentz, 1844) – Canada, United States
- Pardosa schreineri Purcell, 1903 – Namibia, Botswana, South Africa
- Pardosa semicana Simon, 1886 – Sri Lanka, Malaysia, China
- Pardosa steva Lowrie & Gertsch, 1955 – North America
- Pardosa subalpina Schenkel, 1918 – Switzerland
- Pardosa sumatrana (Thorell, 1890) – India, Sri Lanka, Nepal, Bhutan, Bangladesh, Myanmar, Thailand, China, Philippines, Indonesia (Sulawesi)
- Pardosa tesquorum (Odenwall, 1901) – Russia (Europe to Kamchatka), Mongolia, China, Alaska, Canada, United States
- Pardosa thorelli (Collett, 1876) – Norway
- Pardosa timidula (Roewer, 1951) – Yemen, Pakistan, Sri Lanka
- Pardosa tuoba Chamberlin, 1919 – United States
- Pardosa umtalica Purcell, 1903 – Tanzania, Zimbabwe, South Africa
- Pardosa vadosa Barnes, 1959 – United States, Mexico
- Pardosa vancouveri Emerton, 1917 – Canada, United States
- Pardosa xerampelina (Keyserling, 1877) – Alaska, Canada, United States
- Pardosa yavapa Chamberlin, 1925 – United States

Complete species list as of October 2025
- Pardosa abagensis Ovtsharenko, 1979 – Caucasus (Russia, Georgia)
- Pardosa acorensis Simon, 1883 – Azores
- Pardosa adustella (Roewer, 1951) – Russia (Middle Siberia to Far East), Mongolia, China
- Pardosa aenigmatica Tongiorgi, 1966 – Italy, Turkey, Azerbaijan, Israel, Iraq, Iran
- Pardosa afflicta (Holmberg, 1876) – Argentina
- Pardosa agraria Tanaka, 1985 – China, Japan
- Pardosa agrestis (Westring, 1861) – Europe, Caucasus, Russia (Europe to Far East), Central Asia, China
- Pardosa agricola (Thorell, 1856) – Europe, Turkey, Caucasus, Russia (Europe to Middle Siberia), Kazakhstan
  - P. a. borussica (Dahl, 1908) – Lithuania
  - P. a. fucicola (Dahl, 1908) – Finland, Germany
- Pardosa alacris (C. L. Koch, 1833) – Europe, Caucasus (Russia), Kazakhstan (type species)
- Pardosa alasaniensis Mcheidze, 1997 – Georgia
- Pardosa albatula (Roewer, 1951) – Italy to Ukraine and Greece, Turkey, Caucasus (Russia, Georgia)
- Pardosa albomaculata Emerton, 1885 – Alaska, Canada, United States, Greenland
- Pardosa albomarginata Tanikawa, Usio, Endo & Miyashita, 2014 – Japan
- Pardosa algens (Kulczyński, 1908) – Russia (north-eastern Siberia, Far East), Alaska, Canada
- Pardosa algina (Chamberlin, 1916) – Peru
- Pardosa algoides Schenkel, 1963 – Pakistan, India, Bangladesh, China
- Pardosa alii Tikader, 1977 – India
- Pardosa altamontis Chamberlin & Ivie, 1946 – Canada, United States
- Pardosa alticola Alderweireldt & Jocqué, 1992 – Ethiopia, DR Congo, Rwanda
- Pardosa altitudis Tikader & Malhotra, 1980 – India, China, Korea
- Pardosa amacuzacensis Jiménez, 1983 – Mexico
- Pardosa amamiensis (Nakatsudi, 1943) – Japan (Ryukyu Is.)
- Pardosa amazonia (Thorell, 1895) – Myanmar
- Pardosa amentata (Clerck, 1757) – Europe, Turkey, Caucasus, Russia (Europe to South Siberia), Kazakhstan?
- Pardosa anchoroides Yu & Song, 1988 – China
- Pardosa ancorifera Schenkel, 1936 – China
- Pardosa angolensis (Roewer, 1959) – Angola
- Pardosa angusta Denis, 1956 – Morocco
- Pardosa angustifrons Caporiacco, 1941 – Ethiopia
- Pardosa anomala Gertsch, 1933 – Canada, United States
- Pardosa apostoli Barrion & Litsinger, 1995 – Philippines
- Pardosa aquatilis Schmidt & Krause, 1995 – Cape Verde
- Pardosa aquila Buchar & Thaler, 1998 – Caucasus (Russia, Georgia), Turkey?
- Pardosa armeniaca Marusik, 2023 – Armenia
- Pardosa astrigera L. Koch, 1878 – Russia (Far East), Korea, Japan, China, Taiwan
- Pardosa atlantica Emerton, 1913 – United States
- Pardosa atomaria (C. L. Koch, 1847) – Southern Europe, Ukraine, Cyprus, Turkey, Caucasus, Iran
  - P. a. saturiator Caporiacco, 1948 – Greece
- Pardosa atrata (Thorell, 1873) – Northern Europe, Russia (Europe to Far East), Kazakhstan, Mongolia, China?
- Pardosa atromedia Banks, 1904 – United States
- Pardosa atronigra Song, 1995 – China
- Pardosa atropos (L. Koch, 1878) – China, Korea, Japan
- Pardosa aurantipes (Strand, 1906) – Ethiopia
- Pardosa azerifalcata Marusik, Guseinov & Koponen, 2003 – Caucasus, Iran
- Pardosa baehrorum Kronestedt, 1999 – Germany, Switzerland, Austria
- Pardosa balaghatensis Gajbe, 2004 – India
- Pardosa baoshanensis Wang & Qiu, 1991 – China
- Pardosa baraan Logunov & Marusik, 1995 – Russia (South Siberia), Mongolia
- Pardosa bargaonensis Gajbe, 2004 – India
- Pardosa bastarensis Gajbe, 2004 – India
- Pardosa baxianensis Wang & Song, 1993 – China
- Pardosa bellona Banks, 1898 – United States, Mexico
- Pardosa bendamira Roewer, 1960 – Afghanistan
- Pardosa beringiana Dondale & Redner, 1987 – Alaska, Canada
- Pardosa bifasciata (C. L. Koch, 1834) – Europe, Turkey, Caucasus, Russia (Europe to South Siberia), Kazakhstan, Nepal, China
- Pardosa birmanica Simon, 1884 – Myanmar
- Pardosa blanda (C. L. Koch, 1833) – Europe, Turkey?, Georgia? China?
- Pardosa brevivulva Tanaka, 1975 – Russia (Far East), China, Korea, Japan
- Pardosa brunellii Caporiacco, 1940 – Ethiopia
- Pardosa buchari Ovtsharenko, 1979 – Ukraine, Caucasus (Russia, Georgia, Azerbaijan), Iran
- Pardosa bucklei Kronestedt, 1975 – Canada, United States
- Pardosa burasantiensis Tikader & Malhotra, 1976 – India, China
- Pardosa buriatica Sternbergs, 1979 – Russia (South Siberia)
- Pardosa californica Keyserling, 1887 – United States, Mexico
- Pardosa caliraya Barrion & Litsinger, 1995 – Philippines
- Pardosa canalis F. O. Pickard-Cambridge, 1902 – Mexico
- Pardosa caucasica Ovtsharenko, 1979 – Caucasus
- Pardosa cavannae Simon, 1881 – Italy, Albania
- Pardosa cayennensis (Taczanowski, 1874) – French Guiana
- Pardosa cervina Schenkel, 1936 – China
- Pardosa cervinopilosa Schenkel, 1936 – China
- Pardosa chambaensis Tikader & Malhotra, 1976 – India
- Pardosa chapini (Fox, 1935) – China
- Pardosa charitonovi Esyunin, Kabdrakhimov & Efimik, 2024 – Kazakhstan
- Pardosa chenbuensis Yin, Peng, Xie, Bao & Wang, 1997 – China
- Pardosa chiapasiana Gertsch & Wallace, 1937 – Mexico
- Pardosa chindanda Roewer, 1960 – Afghanistan
- Pardosa cincta (Kulczyński, 1887) – Central, Eastern Europe
- Pardosa cinerascens (Roewer, 1951) – Réunion, Mauritius
- Pardosa clavipalpis Purcell, 1903 – East Africa, Botswana, South Africa
- Pardosa cluens Roewer, 1959 – Cameroon
- Pardosa colchica Mcheidze, 1946 – Caucasus (Russia, Georgia, Armenia, Azerbaijan), Iran
- Pardosa coloradensis Banks, 1894 – Canada, United States
- Pardosa completa (Roewer, 1959) – Mozambique
- Pardosa concinna (Thorell, 1877) – Alaska, Canada, United States
- Pardosa concolorata (Roewer, 1951) – Mexico
- Pardosa condolens (O. Pickard-Cambridge, 1885) – China (Yarkand), Tajikistan, Afghanistan, Armenia? India?
- Pardosa confalonierii Caporiacco, 1928 – Libya
- Pardosa confusa Kronestedt, 1988 – United States
- Pardosa consimilis Nosek, 1905 – Albania, North Macedonia, Bulgaria, Turkey, Georgia, Iran
- Pardosa costrica Chamberlin & Ivie, 1942 – Costa Rica
- Pardosa crassistyla Kronestedt, 1988 – United States
- Pardosa credula (O. Pickard-Cambridge, 1885) – China (Yarkand), India?
- Pardosa cribrata Simon, 1876 – Southern Europe, Algeria, Iraq
  - P. c. catalonica Simon, 1937 – Spain
- Pardosa cubana Bryant, 1940 – Cuba, Jamaica, Grand Cayman Is.
- Pardosa dabiensis Chai & Yang, 1998 – China
- Pardosa dagestana Buchar & Thaler, 1998 – Russia (Caucasus), Iran
- Pardosa daisetsuensis Tanaka, 2005 – Japan
- Pardosa dalkhaba Roewer, 1960 – Afghanistan
- Pardosa danica (Sørensen, 1904) – Denmark
- Pardosa datongensis Yin, Peng & Kim, 1997 – China
- Pardosa delicatula Gertsch & Wallace, 1935 – United States, Mexico
- Pardosa desolatula Gertsch & Davis, 1940 – Mexico
- Pardosa dilecta Banks, 1898 – Mexico
- Pardosa distincta (Blackwall, 1846) – Canada, United States
- Pardosa diuturna Fox, 1937 – Alaska, Canada
- Pardosa donabila Roewer, 1955 – Iran
- Pardosa dondalei Jiménez, 1986 – Mexico
- Pardosa dorsalis Banks, 1894 – Canada, United States
- Pardosa dorsuncata Lowrie & Dondale, 1981 – Alaska, Canada, United States
- Pardosa dranensis Hogg, 1922 – Vietnam
- Pardosa drenskii Buchar, 1968 – North Macedonia, Bulgaria, Greece
- Pardosa duplicata Saha, Biswas & Raychaudhuri, 1994 – India
- Pardosa dzheminey Marusik, 1995 – Kazakhstan
- Pardosa ecatli Jiménez, 1985 – Mexico
- Pardosa eiseni (Thorell, 1875) – Scandinavia, Russia (Europe to Far East)
- Pardosa ejusmodi (O. Pickard-Cambridge, 1872) – Lebanon
- Pardosa elegans (Thorell, 1875) – Russia (Europe)
- Pardosa elegantula (Roewer, 1959) – DR Congo
- Pardosa erupticia (Strand, 1913) – Rwanda
- Pardosa eskovi Kronestedt & Marusik, 2011 – Russia (Middle Siberia)
- Pardosa evanescens Alderweireldt & Jocqué, 2008 – Ivory Coast
- Pardosa evelinae Wunderlich, 1984 – Poland
- Pardosa evippiformis Caporiacco, 1935 – India
- Pardosa falcata Schenkel, 1963 – Mongolia, China, Korea
- Pardosa falcifera F. O. Pickard-Cambridge, 1902 – USA to Costa Rica
- Pardosa falcula F. O. Pickard-Cambridge, 1902 – Guatemala
- Pardosa fallax Barnes, 1959 – Mexico
- Pardosa fastosa (Keyserling, 1877) – Costa Rica to Ecuador
- Pardosa femoralis Simon, 1876 – Portugal, Spain, France, Italy, Russia (Europe)
- Pardosa fengi Marusik, Nadolny & Omelko, 2013 – China
- Pardosa ferruginea (L. Koch, 1870) – Europe, Russia (Europe to Far East), Kyrgyzstan, China, Japan
- Pardosa flata Qu, Peng & Yin, 2010 – China
- Pardosa flavipalpis F. O. Pickard-Cambridge, 1902 – Mexico
- Pardosa flavipes Hu, 2001 – China
- Pardosa flavisterna Caporiacco, 1935 – Pakistan, India
- Pardosa fletcheri (Gravely, 1924) – Pakistan, India, Nepal
- Pardosa floridana (Banks, 1896) – United States, Cuba
- Pardosa fomichevi Kronestedt, Marusik & Omelko, 2014 – Russia (Far East)
- Pardosa fortunata (O. Pickard-Cambridge, 1885) – India, China (Yarkand), Tajikistan, Afghanistan, Kazakhstan?
- Pardosa fritzeni Ballarin, Marusik, Omelko & Koponen, 2012 – Kyrgyzstan
- Pardosa fulvipes (Collett, 1876) – Europe, Russia (Europe to South Siberia), Kazakhstan
- Pardosa furcifera (Thorell, 1875) – Alaska, Canada, Greenland
- Pardosa fuscosoma Wunderlich, 1992 – Canary Islands
- Pardosa fuscula (Thorell, 1875) – Alaska, Canada, United States
- Pardosa gastropicta Roewer, 1959 – Kenya
- Pardosa gefsana Roewer, 1959 – Spain, Italy (Sicily, Sardinia), North Africa
- Pardosa gerhardti (Strand, 1922) – Indonesia (Sumatra)
- Pardosa ghigii Caporiacco, 1932 – Morocco
- Pardosa ghourbanda Roewer, 1960 – Afghanistan
- Pardosa giebeli (Pavesi, 1873) – Alps (France, Italy, Switzerland, Germany, Austria)
- Pardosa glabra Mello-Leitão, 1938 – Argentina
- Pardosa glacialis (Thorell, 1872) – Russia (Far North-East), Alaska, Canada, Greenland
- Pardosa golbagha Roewer, 1960 – Afghanistan
- Pardosa gopalai Patel & Reddy, 1993 – India
- Pardosa gothicana Lowrie & Dondale, 1981 – United States
- Pardosa gracilenta (Lucas, 1846) – Algeria
- Pardosa graminea Tanaka, 1985 – China, Japan
- Pardosa groenlandica (Thorell, 1872) – Russia (Middle Siberia to Kamchatka), Alaska, Canada, United States, Greenland
- Pardosa gromovi Ballarin, Marusik, Omelko & Koponen, 2012 – Kazakhstan
- Pardosa guadalajarana Dondale & Redner, 1984 – Mexico to El Salvador
- Pardosa guerechka Roewer, 1960 – Afghanistan
- Pardosa gusarensis Marusik, Guseinov & Koponen, 2003 – Azerbaijan
- Pardosa haibeiensis Yin, Wang, Peng & Xie, 1995 – China
- Pardosa hamifera F. O. Pickard-Cambridge, 1902 – Mexico, Honduras, Jamaica, Hispaniola
- Pardosa hanrasanensis Jo & Paik, 1984 – Russia (South Siberia to Far East), China, Korea
- Pardosa hartmanni (Roewer, 1959) – Tanzania
- Pardosa haupti Song, 1995 – India, China
- Pardosa hedini Schenkel, 1936 – Russia (Far East), China, Korea, Japan
- Pardosa herbosa Jo & Paik, 1984 – Russia (Far East), China, Korea, Japan
- Pardosa hetchi Chamberlin & Ivie, 1942 – United States
- Pardosa heterophthalma (Simon, 1898) – India to Indonesia (Java)
- Pardosa hohxilensis Song, 1995 – China
- Pardosa hokkaido Tanaka & Suwa, 1986 – Russia (Far East), Korea, Japan
- Pardosa hortensis (Thorell, 1872) – Europe, Turkey, Caucasus, Russia (Europe to South Siberia), Iran, Japan
- Pardosa hydaspis Caporiacco, 1935 – Pakistan (Karakorum)
- Pardosa hyperborea (Thorell, 1872) – North America, Greenland, Europe, Russia (Europe to South Siberia)
- Pardosa hypocrita (Simon, 1882) – Yemen
- Pardosa ibex Buchar & Thaler, 1998 – Russia (Caucasus), Georgia
- Pardosa ilgunensis Nosek, 1905 – Turkey
- Pardosa incerta Nosek, 1905 – Bulgaria, Turkey, Russia (Caucasus), Georgia, Azerbaijan, Iran
- Pardosa indecora L. Koch, 1879 – Russia (Europe to Far East), China
- Pardosa iniqua (O. Pickard-Cambridge, 1876) – Egypt
- Pardosa injucunda (O. Pickard-Cambridge, 1876) – Egypt to South Africa
- Pardosa inopina (O. Pickard-Cambridge, 1876) – Algeria, Egypt to East Africa
- Pardosa inquieta (O. Pickard-Cambridge, 1876) – Egypt
- Pardosa invenusta (C. L. Koch, 1837) – Greece
- Pardosa irretita Simon, 1886 – Thailand, Malaysia, Indonesia (Borneo)
- Pardosa irriensis Barrion & Litsinger, 1995 – Philippines
- Pardosa isago Tanaka, 1977 – Russia (Far East), China, Korea, Japan
- Pardosa italica Tongiorgi, 1966 – Southern Europe, Romania, Ukraine, Caucasus, Russia (Europe to South Siberia), Kazakhstan, Central Asia, China
  - P. i. valenta Zyuzin, 1976 – Central Asia
- Pardosa izabella Chamberlin & Ivie, 1942 – Guatemala
- Pardosa jabalpurensis Gajbe & Gajbe, 1999 – India
- Pardosa jaikensis Ponomarev, 2007 – Russia (Europe, West Siberia), Kazakhstan, Iran
- Pardosa jambaruensis Tanaka, 1990 – China, Taiwan, Japan (Okinawa)
- Pardosa jaundea (Roewer, 1960) – Cameroon
- Pardosa jeniseica Eskov & Marusik, 1995 – Russia (South and Middle Siberia to Far East), Kazakhstan, Mongolia
- Pardosa jergeniensis Ponomarev, 1979 – Russia (Europe), Kazakhstan
- Pardosa jinpingensis Yin, Peng, Xie, Bao & Wang, 1997 – China, Korea
- Pardosa josemitensis (Strand, 1908) – United States
- Pardosa kalba Esyunin, Kabdrakhimov & Efimik, 2024 – Kazakhstan
- Pardosa kalpiensis Gajbe, 2004 – India
- Pardosa karagonis (Strand, 1913) – Central, East Africa
  - P. k. nivicola Lessert, 1926 – Tanzania
- Pardosa katangana Roewer, 1959 – DR Congo
- Pardosa kavango Alderweireldt & Jocqué, 1992 – Namibia, Botswana
- Pardosa knappi Dondale, 2007 – United States
- Pardosa kondeana Roewer, 1959 – East Africa
- Pardosa koponeni Nadolny, Omelko, Marusik & Blagoev, 2016 – Russia (Far East), China, Korea, Japan
- Pardosa krausi (Roewer, 1959) – Tanzania
- Pardosa kronestedti Song, Zhang & Zhu, 2002 – China
- Pardosa kupupa (Tikader, 1970) – India, Bhutan, China
- Pardosa kurchum Esyunin, Kabdrakhimov & Efimik, 2024 – Kazakhstan
- Pardosa labradorensis (Thorell, 1875) – Canada, United States
- Pardosa laciniata Song & Haupt, 1995 – China
- Pardosa laevitarsis Tanaka & Suwa, 1986 – Russia (Far East), Korea, Japan (Ryukyu Is.)
- Pardosa lagenaria Qu, Peng & Yin, 2010 – China
- Pardosa laidlawi Simon, 1901 – Malaysia
- Pardosa lapidicina Emerton, 1885 – Canada, United States
- Pardosa lapponica (Thorell, 1872) – Scandinavia, Russia (Europe to Far East), China, Alaska, Canada
- Pardosa lasciva L. Koch, 1879 – Scandinavia, Russia (Europe to Far East), China
- Pardosa latibasa Qu, Peng & Yin, 2010 – China
- Pardosa laura Karsch, 1879 – Russia (Far East), Korea, Japan, China, Taiwan
- Pardosa lawrencei Roewer, 1959 – Tanzania
- Pardosa leipoldti Purcell, 1903 – Zimbabwe, South Africa
- Pardosa leprevosti Mello-Leitão, 1947 – Brazil
- Pardosa lignosa Ghafoor & Alvi, 2007 – Pakistan
- Pardosa lii Marusik, Nadolny & Omelko, 2013 – China
- Pardosa limata Roewer, 1959 – Namibia
- Pardosa lineata F. O. Pickard-Cambridge, 1902 – Mexico
- Pardosa linguata F. O. Pickard-Cambridge, 1902 – Mexico
- Pardosa litangensis Xu, Zhu & Kim, 2010 – China
- Pardosa littoralis Banks, 1896 – Canada, United States, Cuba
- Pardosa logunovi Kronestedt & Marusik, 2011 – Russia (South Siberia), Mongolia
- Pardosa lombokibia (Strand, 1915) – Indonesia (Lombok)
- Pardosa longionycha Yin, Peng, Kim & Wang, 1995 – China
- Pardosa longisepta Chen & Song, 2002 – China
- Pardosa longivulva F. O. Pickard-Cambridge, 1902 – Mexico, Guatemala
- Pardosa lowriei Kronestedt, 1975 – Alaska, Canada, United States
- Pardosa luctinosa Simon, 1876 – Europe, Caucasus, Russia (Europe to South Siberia), Kazakhstan, Iran, China
- Pardosa ludia (Thorell, 1895) – Myanmar
- Pardosa lugubris (Walckenaer, 1802) – Europe, Turkey, Caucasus, Russia (Europe to South Siberia), Kazakhstan, Iran
- Pardosa lurida Roewer, 1959 – Tanzania
- Pardosa lusingana Roewer, 1959 – DR Congo, Namibia
- Pardosa luteola Emerton, 1894 – Canada, United States, Greenland
- Pardosa lycosina Purcell, 1903 – South Africa
- Pardosa lycosinella Lawrence, 1927 – Namibia
- Pardosa lyrata (Odenwall, 1901) – Russia (Middle Siberia to Far East), Mongolia
- Pardosa lyrifera Schenkel, 1936 – China, Korea, Japan
- Pardosa mabinii Barrion & Litsinger, 1995 – Philippines
- Pardosa mackenziana (Keyserling, 1877) – Alaska, Canada, United States
- Pardosa maculatipes (Keyserling, 1887) – Chile
- Pardosa maimaneha Roewer, 1960 – Afghanistan
- Pardosa maisa Hippa & Mannila, 1982 – Finland, Estonia, Central and eastern Europe, Russia (Urals, West Siberia)
- Pardosa manicata Thorell, 1899 – Cameroon
- Pardosa marchei Simon, 1890 – Mariana Is.
- Pardosa marialuisae Dondale & Redner, 1984 – Mexico to Honduras
- Pardosa martensi Buchar, 1978 – Nepal
- Pardosa martinii (Pavesi, 1883) – Ethiopia
- Pardosa masareyi Mello-Leitão, 1939 – Ecuador
- Pardosa masurae Esyunin & Efimik, 1998 – Russia (Urals, Middle Siberia)
- Pardosa mayana Dondale & Redner, 1984 – Mexico to Costa Rica
- Pardosa medialis Banks, 1898 – Mexico
- Pardosa mendicans (Simon, 1882) – Yemen
- Pardosa mercurialis Montgomery, 1904 – United States
- Pardosa messingerae (Strand, 1916) – West, Central, East Africa
- Pardosa metlakatla Emerton, 1917 – Alaska, Canada, United States
- Pardosa mikhailovi Ballarin, Marusik, Omelko & Koponen, 2012 – Kazakhstan
- Pardosa milvina (Hentz, 1844) – Canada, United States
- Pardosa minuta Tikader & Malhotra, 1976 – India, Bangladesh
- Pardosa mionebulosa Yin, Peng, Xie, Bao & Wang, 1997 – China
- Pardosa miquanensis Yin, Wang, Peng & Xie, 1995 – China
- Pardosa mira Caporiacco, 1941 – Ethiopia
- Pardosa mirzakhaniae Shafaie, Mirshamsi, Aliabadian, Moradmand & Marusik, 2018 – Iran, Turkmenistan
- Pardosa mixta (Kulczyński, 1887) – Europe, Turkey
- Pardosa modica (Blackwall, 1846) – Canada, United States
- Pardosa moesta Banks, 1892 – Alaska, Canada, United States
- Pardosa mongolica Kulczyński, 1901 – Russia (Middle to north-eastern Siberia), Tajikistan, Nepal, Mongolia, China
- Pardosa montgomeryi Gertsch, 1934 – United States, Mexico
- Pardosa monticola (Clerck, 1757) – Europe, Turkey, Georgia
  - P. m. ambigua Simon, 1937 – France
  - P. m. minima Simon, 1876 – France
  - P. m. pseudosaltuaria Simon, 1937 – France
- Pardosa mordagica Tang, Urita & Song, 1995 – China
- Pardosa morosa (L. Koch, 1870) – Europe to Central Asia, Morocco, Iraq, Iran
- Pardosa mtugensis (Strand, 1908) – Morocco
- Pardosa mubalea Roewer, 1959 – DR Congo
- Pardosa mukundi Tikader & Malhotra, 1980 – Pakistan, India, Bhutan
- Pardosa mulaiki Gertsch, 1934 – Canada, United States
- Pardosa muzafari Ghafoor & Alvi, 2007 – Pakistan
- Pardosa muzkolica Kononenko, 1978 – Tajikistan
- Pardosa naevia (L. Koch, 1875) – Egypt, Ethiopia
- Pardosa naevioides (Strand, 1916) – Namibia
- Pardosa nanyuensis Yin, Peng, Kim & Wang, 1995 – China
- Pardosa nebulosa (Thorell, 1872) – Italy, Central Europe to Greece and Ukraine, Turkey, Caucasus, Russia (Europe to South Siberia), Kazakhstan, Iran, Central Asia, China
- Pardosa nenilini Marusik, 1995 – Russia (South Siberia), Kazakhstan, Mongolia
- Pardosa nesiotis (Thorell, 1878) – Indonesia (Sumatra, Ambon)
- Pardosa nigra (C. L. Koch, 1834) – Europe
- Pardosa nigriceps (Thorell, 1856) – Europe
- Pardosa ninigoriensis Mcheidze, 1997 – Georgia
- Pardosa nojimai Tanaka, 1998 – Korea, Japan
- Pardosa nordicolens Chamberlin & Ivie, 1947 – Russia (north-eastern Siberia to Far East), Alaska, Canada
- Pardosa nostrorum Alderweireldt & Jocqué, 1992 – Mozambique, South Africa
- Pardosa novitatis (Strand, 1906) – Ethiopia
- Pardosa obscuripes Simon, 1909 – Morocco
- Pardosa observans (O. Pickard-Cambridge, 1876) – Morocco, Libya, Egypt, Sudan
- Pardosa occidentalis Simon, 1881 – Portugal, Spain, France, Italy (Sardinia)
- Pardosa odenwalli Sternbergs, 1979 – Russia (South Siberia)
- Pardosa ogudovi Fomichev, 2022 – Russia (West Siberia)
- Pardosa oksalai Marusik, Hippa & Koponen, 1996 – Russia (Europe to South Siberia), Kazakhstan
- Pardosa oljunae Lobanova, 1978 – Russia (West Siberia to Far East)
- Pardosa olympica Tongiorgi, 1966 – Greece (incl. Crete)
- Pardosa ontariensis Gertsch, 1933 – Canada, United States
- Pardosa orcchaensis Gajbe, 2004 – India
- Pardosa orealis Buchar, 1984 – Nepal
- Pardosa oreophila Simon, 1937 – Central, Southern Europe
- Pardosa oriens (Chamberlin, 1924) – India, Bhutan, China, Japan
- Pardosa orophila Gertsch, 1933 – United States, Mexico
- Pardosa orthodox Chamberlin, 1924 – United States, Mexico
- Pardosa ourayensis Gertsch, 1933 – United States
- Pardosa ovambica Roewer, 1959 – Namibia
- Pardosa ovtchinnikovi Ballarin, Marusik, Omelko & Koponen, 2012 – Iran, Turkmenistan, Uzbekistan, Tajikistan
- Pardosa pacata Fox, 1937 – China (Hong Kong)
- Pardosa pahalanga Barrion & Litsinger, 1995 – Philippines
- Pardosa paleata Alderweireldt & Jocqué, 1992 – Libya
- Pardosa paludicola (Clerck, 1757) – Europe, Turkey, Caucasus, Russia (Europe to Far East), Kazakhstan, Iran, China
- Pardosa palustris (Linnaeus, 1758) – Europe, Turkey, Russia (Europe to Far East), Kazakhstan, Central Asia, China, Korea, Alaska, Canada
- Pardosa pantinii Ballarin, Marusik, Omelko & Koponen, 2012 – Tajikistan
- Pardosa papilionaca Chen & Song, 2003 – China
- Pardosa paracolchica Zyuzin & Logunov, 2000 – Caucasus (Russia, Azerbaijan)
- Pardosa paralapponica Schenkel, 1963 – Kazakhstan, Mongolia, China
- Pardosa paramushirensis (Nakatsudi, 1937) – Russia (Kurile Is.), Japan
- Pardosa paratesquorum Schenkel, 1963 – Russia (South Siberia), Mongolia, China
- Pardosa parathompsoni Wang & Zhang, 2014 – India, China
- Pardosa partita Simon, 1885 – India
- Pardosa parvula Banks, 1904 – United States
- Pardosa patapatensis Barrion & Litsinger, 1995 – Philippines
- Pardosa pauxilla Montgomery, 1904 – United States
- Pardosa pedia Dondale, 2007 – Canada
- Pardosa persiana Marusik & Nadolny, 2020 – Iran
- Pardosa persica (Roewer, 1955) – Iran
- Pardosa pertinax von Helversen, 2000 – Greece, Turkey
- Pardosa petrunkevitchi Gertsch, 1934 – Mexico
- Pardosa pexa Hickman, 1944 – Australia (South Australia)
- Pardosa pinangensis (Thorell, 1890) – Malaysia, Indonesia (Sumatra)
- Pardosa pirkuliensis Zyuzin & Logunov, 2000 – Caucasus (Russia, Azerbaijan)
- Pardosa plagula F. O. Pickard-Cambridge, 1902 – Mexico
- Pardosa plumipedata (Roewer, 1951) – Argentina
- Pardosa plumipes (Thorell, 1875) – Sweden, Finland, Eastern Europe, Caucasus, Russia (Europe to Far East), Kazakhstan, Central Asia, China, Japan
- Pardosa podhorskii (Kulczyński, 1907) – Russia (north-eastern Siberia, Far North-East), Alaska, Canada
- Pardosa poecila (Herman, 1879) – Hungary
- Pardosa pontica (Thorell, 1875) – Romania, Ukraine, Russia (Europe), Caucasus, Central Asia
- Pardosa portoricensis Banks, 1901 – Puerto Rico, Virgin Is. Antigua
- Pardosa potamophila Lawrence, 1927 – Namibia
- Pardosa praepes Simon, 1886 – Senegal
- Pardosa prativaga (L. Koch, 1870) – Europe, Turkey, Caucasus, Russia (Europe to South Siberia), Central Asia
  - P. p. scoparia Simon, 1937 – France
- Pardosa profuga (Herman, 1879) – Hungary
- Pardosa prolifica F. O. Pickard-Cambridge, 1902 – Mexico to Panama
- Pardosa proxima (C. L. Koch, 1847) – Macaronesia, northern Africa, Europe, Caucasus, Russia (Europe to Far East), Kazakhstan, Iran, Central Asia, China
  - P. p. annulatoides (Strand, 1915) – Israel
  - P. p. poetica Simon, 1876 – Portugal, Spain, France
- Pardosa psammodes (Thorell, 1887) – Myanmar
- Pardosa pseudoannulata (Bösenberg & Strand, 1906) – Pakistan, India, Nepal, Bhutan, China, Taiwan, Korea, Japan, Laos, Philippines, Indonesia (Java)
- Pardosa pseudochapini Peng, 2011 – China
- Pardosa pseudokaragonis (Strand, 1913) – Central Africa
- Pardosa pseudolaevitarsis Kim & Yoo, 2019 – Korea
- Pardosa pseudolapponica Marusik, 1995 – Kazakhstan
- Pardosa pseudomixta Marusik & Fritzén, 2009 – China
- Pardosa pseudostrigillata Tongiorgi, 1966 – Austria, Italy, Slovenia
- Pardosa pseudotorrentum Miller & Buchar, 1972 – Pakistan
- Pardosa pullata (Clerck, 1757) – Europe, Turkey, Caucasus, Russia (Europe to South Siberia), Kazakhstan, Central Asia
  - P. p. jugorum Simon, 1937 – France
- Pardosa pumilio Roewer, 1959 – Ethiopia
- Pardosa purbeckensis F. O. Pickard-Cambridge, 1895 – Western, Central Europe
- Pardosa pusiola (Thorell, 1891) – India, Sri Lanka, Nepal, Bhutan, Bangladesh, Myanmar, China, Laos, Malaysia, Indonesia (Java)
- Pardosa pyrenaica Kronestedt, 2007 – France, Andorra, Spain
- Pardosa qingzangensis Hu, 2001 – China
- Pardosa qinhaiensis Yin, Wang, Peng & Xie, 1995 – China
- Pardosa qionghuai Yin, Peng, Kim & Wang, 1995 – Bhutan, China
- Pardosa quadridentata Xu & Zhu, 2009 – China
- Pardosa rabulana (Thorell, 1890) – Malaysia, Indonesia (Sumatra, Java)
- Pardosa rainieriana Lowrie & Dondale, 1981 – Canada, United States
- Pardosa ramulosa (McCook, 1894) – United States, Mexico, Panama
- Pardosa ranjani Gajbe, 2004 – India
- Pardosa rara (Keyserling, 1891) – Brazil, Argentina
- Pardosa rascheri (Dahl, 1908) – Papua New Guinea (Bismarck Arch.)
- Pardosa rhenockensis (Tikader, 1970) – India
- Pardosa rhombisepta Roewer, 1960 – Afghanistan
- Pardosa riparia (C. L. Koch, 1833) – Europe, Turkey, Russia (Europe to Far East), Central Asia, Japan
- Pardosa roeweri Schenkel, 1963 – China
- Pardosa roscai (Roewer, 1951) – Bulgaria, Romania, Cyprus, Turkey, Iraq, Iran
- Pardosa royi Biswas & Raychaudhuri, 2003 – Bangladesh
- Pardosa ruanda (Strand, 1913) – Rwanda
- Pardosa rudis Yin, Peng, Kim & Wang, 1995 – China
- Pardosa rugegensis (Strand, 1913) – Rwanda
- Pardosa sagei Gertsch & Wallace, 1937 – Panama
- Pardosa saltans Töpfer-Hofmann, 2000 – Europe, Turkey, Georgia
- Pardosa saltonia Dondale & Redner, 1984 – United States, Mexico
- Pardosa saltuaria (L. Koch, 1870) – Central Europe to Kazakhstan
- Pardosa saltuarides (Strand, 1908) – Ethiopia
- Pardosa sangzhiensis Yin, Peng, Kim & Wang, 1995 – China
- Pardosa sanmenensis Yu & Song, 1988 – China
- Pardosa santamaria Barrion & Litsinger, 1995 – Philippines
- Pardosa saturatior Simon, 1937 – Alps (France, Italy, Switzerland, Liechtenstein, Germany, Austria, Slovenia)
- Pardosa saxatilis (Hentz, 1844) – Canada, United States
- Pardosa schenkeli Lessert, 1904 – Europe, Turkey, Caucasus, Russia (Europe to Far East), Kazakhstan, China
- Pardosa schreineri Purcell, 1903 – Namibia, Botswana, South Africa
- Pardosa schubotzi (Strand, 1913) – DR Congo, Kenya
- Pardosa selengensis (Odenwall, 1901) – Russia (South Siberia, Far East), Mongolia
- Pardosa semicana Simon, 1886 – Sri Lanka, Malaysia, China
- Pardosa septentrionalis (Westring, 1861) – Scandinavia, Russia (Europe to north-eastern Siberia)
- Pardosa serena (L. Koch, 1875) – Egypt
- Pardosa shyamae (Tikader, 1970) – India, Bangladesh, China
- Pardosa sibiniformis Tang, Urita & Song, 1995 – China
- Pardosa sichuanensis Yu & Song, 1991 – China
- Pardosa sierra Banks, 1898 – Mexico
- Pardosa silvarum Hu, 2001 – China
- Pardosa sinistra (Thorell, 1877) – Canada, United States
- Pardosa soccata Yu & Song, 1988 – China
- Pardosa socorroensis Jiménez, 1991 – Mexico
- Pardosa sodalis Holm, 1970 – Russia (Middle Siberia to Far North-East), Alaska, Canada
- Pardosa songosa Tikader & Malhotra, 1976 – India, Bangladesh, China
- Pardosa sordidata (Thorell, 1875) – France, Italy, Central and eastern Europe
- Pardosa sowerbyi Hogg, 1912 – China
- Pardosa sphagnicola (Dahl, 1908) – Europe, Russia (Europe to South Siberia)
- Pardosa stellata (O. Pickard-Cambridge, 1885) – China (Yarkand), Tajikistan, Afghanistan, India?
- Pardosa sternalis (Thorell, 1877) – North America
- Pardosa steva Lowrie & Gertsch, 1955 – North America
- Pardosa straeleni Roewer, 1959 – DR Congo
- Pardosa strandembriki Caporiacco, 1949 – Ethiopia
- Pardosa strena Yu & Song, 1988 – China
- Pardosa strigata Yu & Song, 1988 – China
- Pardosa strix (Holmberg, 1876) – Argentina
- Pardosa subalpina Schenkel, 1918 – Switzerland
- Pardosa subanchoroides Wang & Song, 1993 – China
- Pardosa subproximella (Strand, 1906) – Ethiopia
- Pardosa subsordidatula (Strand, 1915) – Israel, Jordan?
- Pardosa sumatrana (Thorell, 1890) – India, Sri Lanka, Nepal, Bhutan, Bangladesh, Myanmar, Thailand, China, Philippines, Indonesia (Sulawesi)
- Pardosa sura Chamberlin & Ivie, 1941 – United States, Mexico
- Pardosa sutherlandi (Gravely, 1924) – India, Nepal, Bhutan
- Pardosa suwai Tanaka, 1985 – Russia (Far East), China, Japan
- Pardosa svatoni Marusik, Nadolny & Omelko, 2013 – Kazakhstan
- Pardosa taczanowskii (Thorell, 1875) – Russia (Middle Siberia to Far East), Mongolia, China
- Pardosa takahashii (Saito, 1936) – China, Taiwan, Japan, Okinawa
- Pardosa tangana Roewer, 1959 – Tanzania
- Pardosa tappaensis Gajbe, 2004 – India
- Pardosa tasevi Buchar, 1968 – Eastern Europe, Turkey, Caucasus
- Pardosa temreshevi Fomichev, 2022 – Kazakhstan
- Pardosa tenera Thorell, 1899 – Cameroon
- Pardosa tenuipes L. Koch, 1882 – Portugal, Spain, Italy, France, Great Britain, Belgium, Netherlands, Germany, Austria, Slovakia, Hungary
- Pardosa tesquorum (Odenwall, 1901) – Russia (Europe to Kamchatka), Mongolia, China, Alaska, Canada, United States
- Pardosa tesquorumoides Song & Yu, 1990 – China
- Pardosa tetonensis Gertsch, 1933 – United States
- Pardosa thalassia (Thorell, 1891) – India (Nicobar Is.)
- Pardosa thompsoni Alderweireldt & Jocqué, 1992 – Burkina Faso, Sudan, Kenya
- Pardosa thorelli (Collett, 1876) – Norway
- Pardosa timidula (Roewer, 1951) – Yemen, Pakistan, Sri Lanka
- Pardosa torrentum Simon, 1876 – France, Italy, Switzerland, Germany, Austria, Georgia
  - P. t. integra Denis, 1950 – France
- Pardosa trailli (O. Pickard-Cambridge, 1873) – Britain, Scandinavia
- Pardosa tridentis Caporiacco, 1935 – India, Nepal
- Pardosa trifoveata (Strand, 1907) – China
- Pardosa tristicella (Roewer, 1951) – Colombia
- Pardosa tristiculella (Roewer, 1951) – Myanmar
- Pardosa trottai Ballarin, Marusik, Omelko & Koponen, 2012 – Kyrgyzstan
- Pardosa tschekiangiensis Schenkel, 1963 – China
- Pardosa tuberosa Wang & Zhang, 2014 – India, China
- Pardosa tumida Barnes, 1959 – Mexico
- Pardosa tuoba Chamberlin, 1919 – United States
- Pardosa turkestanica (Roewer, 1951) – Kazakhstan, Russia (South Siberia), Central Asia
- Pardosa tyshchenkoi Zyuzin & Marusik, 1989 – Russia (Middle Siberia to Far East)
- Pardosa uiensis Esyunin, 1996 – Russia (Urals)
- Pardosa uintana Gertsch, 1933 – Alaska, Canada, United States
- Pardosa umtalica Purcell, 1903 – Tanzania, Zimbabwe, South Africa
- Pardosa uncata (Thorell, 1877) – United States
- Pardosa uncifera Schenkel, 1963 – Russia (South Siberia), China, Korea
- Pardosa unciferodies Qu, Peng & Yin, 2010 – China
- Pardosa unguifera F. O. Pickard-Cambridge, 1902 – Mexico, Guatemala
- Pardosa utahensis Chamberlin, 1919 – United States
- Pardosa v-signata Soares & Camargo, 1948 – Brazil
- Pardosa vadosa Barnes, 1959 – United States, Mexico
- Pardosa vagula (Thorell, 1890) – Indonesia (Sumatra, Mentawai Is., Simeulue, Java)
- Pardosa valens Barnes, 1959 – United States, Mexico
- Pardosa valida Banks, 1893 – Sierra Leone, DR Congo (region)
- Pardosa vancouveri Emerton, 1917 – Canada, United States
- Pardosa vatovae Caporiacco, 1940 – Ethiopia
- Pardosa verticillifer (Strand, 1906) – Ethiopia
- Pardosa vindex (O. Pickard-Cambridge, 1885) – China (Yarkand)
- Pardosa vindicata (O. Pickard-Cambridge, 1885) – Pakistan, China (Yarkand)
- Pardosa vinsoni (Roewer, 1951) – Madagascar
- Pardosa virgata Kulczyński, 1901 – Mongolia
- Pardosa vittata (Keyserling, 1863) – Europe to Georgia
- Pardosa vogelae Kronestedt, 1993 – United States
- Pardosa vulvitecta Schenkel, 1936 – China
- Pardosa wagleri (Hahn, 1822) – Europe, Turkey, Caucasus, Russia (Europe to South Siberia), Central Asia, China
- Pardosa warayensis Barrion & Litsinger, 1995 – Philippines
- Pardosa wasatchensis Gertsch, 1933 – United States
- Pardosa wyuta Gertsch, 1934 – Canada, United States
- Pardosa xerampelina (Keyserling, 1877) – Alaska, Canada, United States
- Pardosa xerophila Vogel, 1964 – United States, Mexico
- Pardosa yadongensis Hu & Li, 1987 – China
- Pardosa yaginumai Tanaka, 1977 – Japan
- Pardosa yamanoi Tanaka & Suwa, 1986 – Japan
- Pardosa yavapa Chamberlin, 1925 – United States
- Pardosa yongduensis Kim & Chae, 2012 – Korea
- Pardosa zagrosica Zamani & Nadolny, 2022 – Iran
- Pardosa zhangi Song & Haupt, 1995 – China
- Pardosa zhishengi Omelko, 2024 – Laos
- Pardosa zionis Chamberlin & Ivie, 1942 – United States, Mexico
- Pardosa zonsteini Ballarin, Marusik, Omelko & Koponen, 2012 – Iran, Kazakhstan, Central Asia
- Pardosa zuojiani Song & Haupt, 1995 – China
- Pardosa zyuzini Kronestedt & Marusik, 2011 – Russia (South Siberia), Mongolia

=== Dubious names ===
Nomina dubia (dubious names) include:

- Pardosa bernensis (Lebert, 1877)
- Pardosa kratochvili (Kolosváry, 1934)
- Pardosa palliclava (Strand, 1907)
