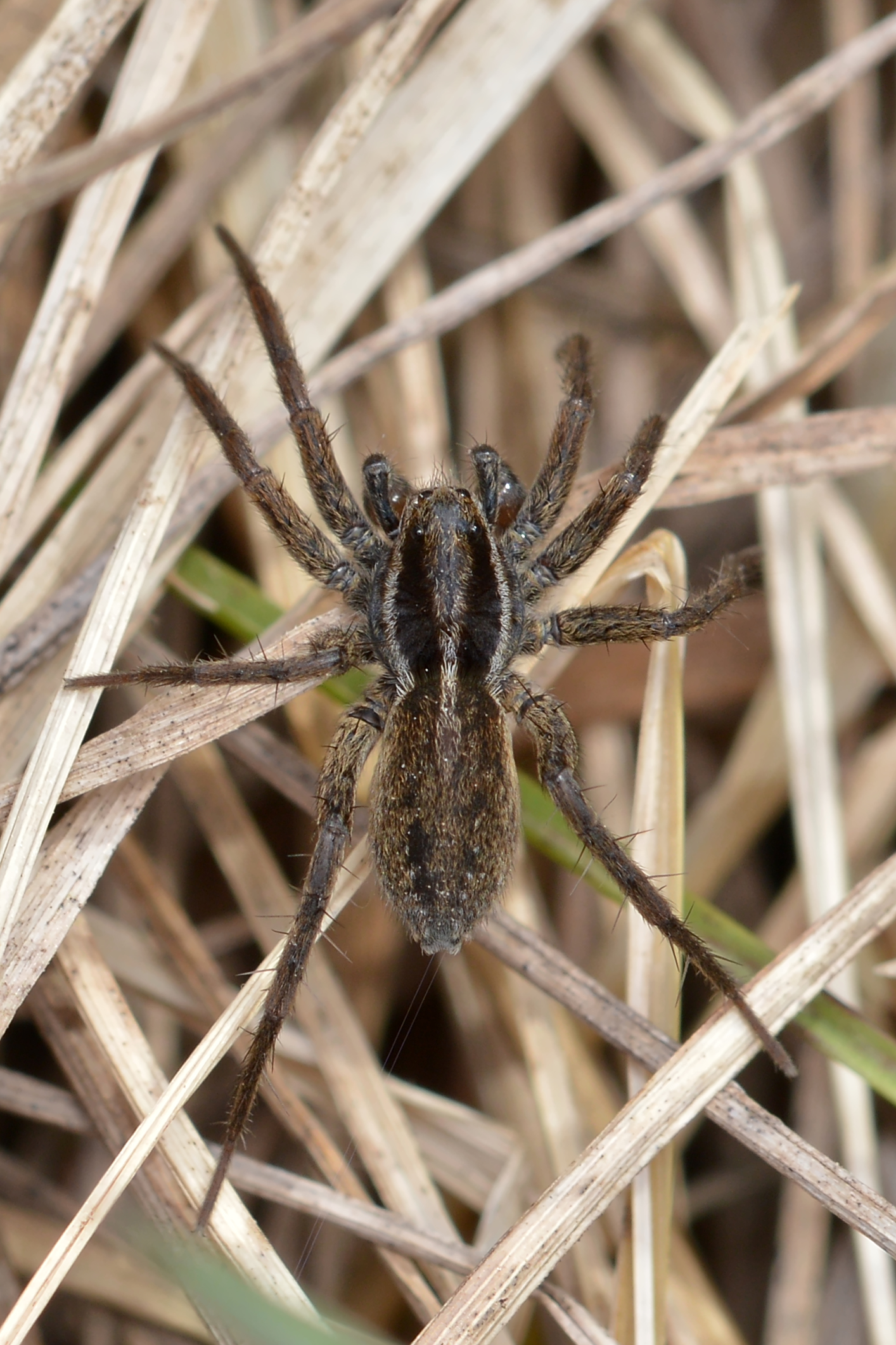

Scientific classification
- Kingdom: Animalia
- Phylum: Arthropoda
- Subphylum: Chelicerata
- Class: Arachnida
- Order: Araneae
- Infraorder: Araneomorphae
- Family: Lycosidae
- Genus: Pardosa
- Species: P. modica

Binomial name
- Pardosa modica (Blackwall, 1846)

= Pardosa modica =

Species of spider

Pardosa modica is a species of wolf spider in the family Lycosidae. It is found in the United States and Canada.
