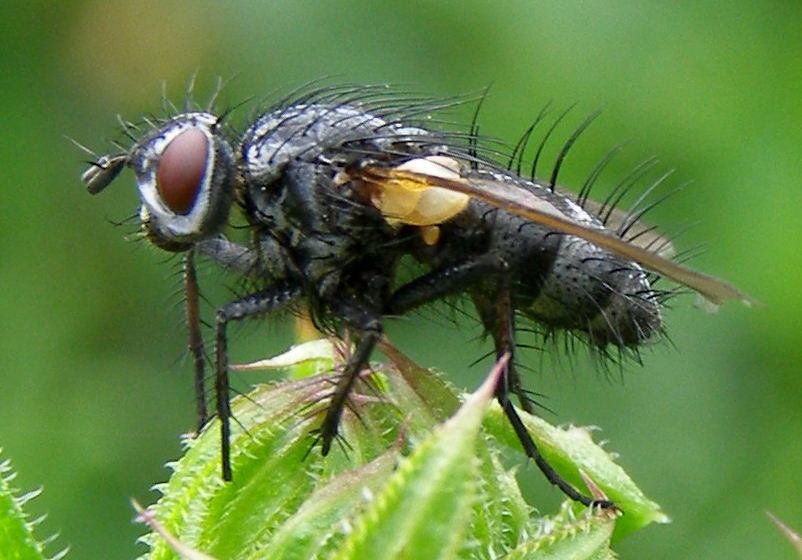
- Pelatachina tibialis

Scientific classification
- Kingdom: Animalia
- Phylum: Arthropoda
- Class: Insecta
- Order: Diptera
- Family: Tachinidae
- Subfamily: Tachininae
- Tribe: Pelatachinini

= Pelatachinini =

Tribe of flies

Pelatachinini is a tribe of flies in the family Tachinidae.

== Genera ==
- Paralypha Mesnil, 1963
- Pelatachina Meade, 1894
