= G. japonica =

G. japonica may refer to:

- Geoemyda japonica, the Ryukyu black-breasted leaf turtle or Ryukyu leaf turtle, a turtle species endemic to the Ryukyu Islands in Japan
- Gleditsia japonica, the Japanese honey locust, a tree species in the genus Gleditsia
- Gymnomacquartia japonica, a tachinid fly species
- Gyrinicola japonica, a nematode parasite species

== See also ==
- Japonica (disambiguation)
