= Macquartia praefica =

Scientific classification
- Kingdom: Animalia
- Phylum: Arthropoda
- Clade: Pancrustacea
- Class: Insecta
- Order: Diptera
- Family: Tachinidae
- Subfamily: Tachininae
- Tribe: Macquartiini
- Genus: Macquartia
- Species: M. praefica

Binomial name
- Macquartia praefica (Meigen, 1824)

Synonyms
- Tachina praefica Meigen, 1824; Macquartia microcera Robineau-Desvoidy, 1830; Tachina olizon Walker, 1849; Tachina torta Walker, 1853; Macquartia celebs Rondani, 1859; Arraltia atra Robineau-Desvoidy, 1863; Macquartia spinicincta Meade, 1891; Macquartia echinalis Pandellé, 1895; Macquartia fascicularis Pandellé, 1895

Species of fly

Macquartia praefica is a European species of fly in the family Tachinidae.

== Distribution ==
British Isles, Czech Republic, Hungary, Poland, Romania, Slovakia, Ukraine, Bulgaria, Greece, Italy, Slovenia, Spain, Turkey, Austria, Belgium, France, Germany, Netherlands, Switzerland, Iran, Israel, Transcaucasia.
