= Eriothrix prolixa =

Scientific classification
- Kingdom: Animalia
- Phylum: Arthropoda
- Class: Insecta
- Order: Diptera
- Family: Tachinidae
- Subfamily: Dexiinae
- Tribe: Voriini
- Genus: Eriothrix
- Species: E. prolixa

Binomial name
- Eriothrix prolixa (Meigen, 1824)

Synonyms
- Aphria angustifrons Meade, 1892; Feria nitida Robineau-Desvoidy, 1830; Tachina bilineatus Macquart, 1854; Tachina ciliaris Zetterstedt, 1844; Tachina prolixa Meigen, 1824; Tachina spinosus Zetterstedt, 1838

Species of fly

Eriothrix prolixa is a species of fly in the family Tachinidae.

== Distribution ==
Turkmenistan, British Isles, Czech Republic, Hungary, Lithuania, Poland, Romania, Slovakia, Ukraine, Denmark, Finland, Norway, Sweden, Bulgaria, Croatia, Greece, Italy, Serbia, Slovenia, Spain, Turkey, Austria, France, Germany, Netherlands, Switzerland, Mongolia, Russia, China, Transcaucasia.
