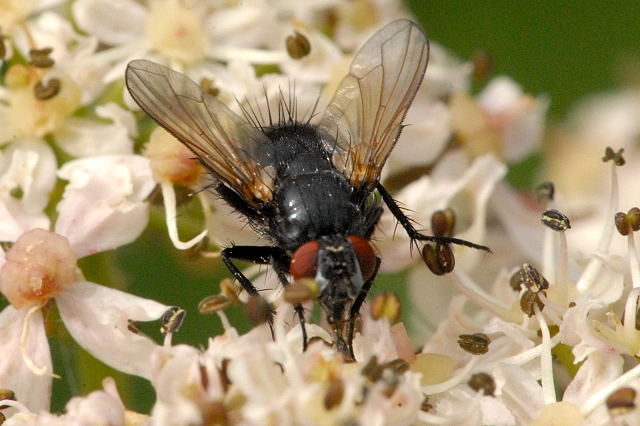
- Female

Scientific classification
- Kingdom: Animalia
- Phylum: Arthropoda
- Clade: Pancrustacea
- Class: Insecta
- Order: Diptera
- Family: Tachinidae
- Subfamily: Tachininae
- Tribe: Macquartiini
- Genus: Macquartia
- Species: M. tenebricosa

Binomial name
- Macquartia tenebricosa (Meigen, 1824)

Synonyms
- List: Tachina tenebricosa Meigen, 1824; Tachina tristis Meigen, 1824; Minella nitida Robineau-Desvoidy, 1830; Tachina nitida Zetterstedt, 1838; Tachina fumata Zetterstedt, 1844; Macquartia affinis Schiner, 1862; Zophomyia rufipalpis Macquart, 1855; Tachina umbrosa Zetterstedt, 1859; Macquartia carbonaria Robineau-Desvoidy, 1863; Macquartia laeta Robineau-Desvoidy, 1863; Macquartia villica Robineau-Desvoidy, 1863; Phryxe tenebricosa Robineau-Desvoidy, 1863; Macquartia clausicella Rondani, 1865

= Macquartia tenebricosa =

Species of fly

Macquartia tenebricosa is a European species of fly in the family Tachinidae.

== Distribution ==
British Isles, Czech Republic, Estonia, Hungary, Lithuania, Moldova, Poland, Romania, Slovakia, Ukraine, Denmark, Finland, Norway, Sweden, Albania, Andorra, Bosnia and Herzegovina, Bulgaria, Croatia, Italy, Portugal, Serbia, Slovenia, Spain, Turkey, Austria, Belgium, France, Germany, Netherlands, Switzerland, Iran, Israel, Mongolia, Russia, Transcaucasia, China.
