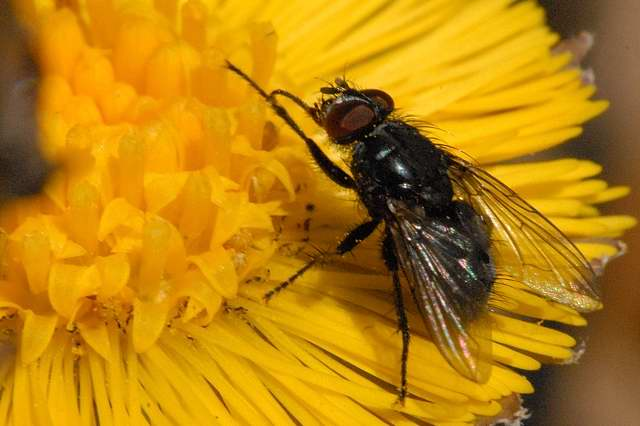
- Male Macquartia dispar

Scientific classification
- Kingdom: Animalia
- Phylum: Arthropoda
- Clade: Pancrustacea
- Class: Insecta
- Order: Diptera
- Family: Tachinidae
- Subfamily: Tachininae
- Tribe: Macquartiini
- Genus: Macquartia
- Species: M. dispar

Binomial name
- Macquartia dispar (Fallén, 1820)

Synonyms
- Tachina rufipes Fallén, 1820; Tachina flavipes Meigen, 1824; Macquartia rubripes Robineau-Desvoidy, 1830; Macquartia ochropus Meigen, 1838; Tachina titomus Walker, 1849; Macquartia imperfecta Robineau-Desvoidy, 1863; Macquartia micans Robineau-Desvoidy, 1863; Macquartia tibialis Robineau-Desvoidy, 1863; Loewia setigena Portschinsky, 1881

= Macquartia dispar =

Species of fly

Macquartia dispar is a European species of fly in the family Tachinidae.

== Distribution ==
British Isles, Belarus, Czech Republic, Hungary, Moldova, Poland, Romania, Slovakia, Ukraine, Denmark, Finland, Sweden, Andorra, Bulgaria, Croatia, Greece, Italy, Portugal, Serbia, Spain, Austria, Belgium, France, Germany, Netherlands, Iran, Mongolia, Russia, Transcaucasia, China.
