= Admontia grandicornis =

Scientific classification
- Kingdom: Animalia
- Phylum: Arthropoda
- Class: Insecta
- Order: Diptera
- Family: Tachinidae
- Subfamily: Exoristinae
- Tribe: Blondeliini
- Genus: Admontia
- Species: A. grandicornis

Binomial name
- Admontia grandicornis (Zetterstedt, 1849)

Synonyms
- Frontina nigricans (Meade, 1892); Gravenhorstia longicornis Robineau-Desvoidy, 1863; Tachina grandicornis Zetterstedt, 1849

Species of fly

Admontia grandicornis is a species of fly in the family Tachinidae.

== Distribution ==
Austria, Czech Republic, Denmark, Finland, France, Germany, Hungary, Italy, Netherlands, Norway, Poland, Russia, Slovakia, Sweden, Switzerland, U.K.
