= Brachicheta strigata =

Scientific classification
- Kingdom: Animalia
- Phylum: Arthropoda
- Class: Insecta
- Order: Diptera
- Family: Tachinidae
- Subfamily: Exoristinae
- Tribe: Goniini
- Genus: Brachicheta
- Species: B. strigata

Binomial name
- Brachicheta strigata (Meigen, 1824)

Synonyms
- Desvoidia fusca Meade, 1892; Frontina spinigera Rondani, 1861; Tachina hystrix Zetterstedt, 1844; Tachina strigata Meigen, 1824

Species of fly

Brachicheta stricata is a species of fly in the family Tachinidae.

== Distribution ==
British Isles, Czech Republic, Hungary, Poland, Romania, Slovakia, Ukraine, Denmark, Finland, Norway, Sweden, Croatia, Italy, Serbia, Spain, Austria, Belgium, France, Germany, Netherlands, Switzerland, Russia, Armenia, Azerbaijan, Georgia.
