= Macquartia pubiceps =

Scientific classification
- Kingdom: Animalia
- Phylum: Arthropoda
- Clade: Pancrustacea
- Class: Insecta
- Order: Diptera
- Family: Tachinidae
- Subfamily: Tachininae
- Tribe: Macquartiini
- Genus: Macquartia
- Species: M. pubiceps

Binomial name
- Macquartia pubiceps (Zetterstedt, 1845)

Synonyms
- Musca pubiceps Zetterstedt, 1845; Ptilops nubilis Rondani, 1862; Ptilops vidua Rondani, 1862; Macquartia flavisquama Belanovsky, 1931

Species of fly

Macquartia pubiceps is a European species of fly in the family Tachinidae.

== Distribution ==
British Isles, Czech Republic, Hungary, Lithuania, Poland, Romania, Slovakia, Ukraine, Sweden, Italy, Portugal, Spain, Austria, Belgium, France, Germany, Netherlands, Japan, Russia, Transcaucasia, China.
