= Macquartia tessellum =

Scientific classification
- Kingdom: Animalia
- Phylum: Arthropoda
- Clade: Pancrustacea
- Class: Insecta
- Order: Diptera
- Family: Tachinidae
- Subfamily: Tachininae
- Tribe: Macquartiini
- Genus: Macquartia
- Species: M. tessellum

Binomial name
- Macquartia tessellum (Meigen, 1824)

Synonyms
- Tachina tessellum Meigen, 1824; Tachina brevicornis Macquart, 1839; Macquartia occlusa Rondani, 1859; Olbya brunisquamis Robineau-Desvoidy, 1863; Hesione microcera Robineau-Desvoidy, 1863; Macquartia olivaceomaculata Portschinsky, 1881; Silbermannia genistae Pandellé, 1895

Species of fly

Macquartia tessellum is a European species of fly in the family Tachinidae.

== Distribution ==
Kyrgyzstan, Tajikistan, Turkmenistan, China, British Isles, Andorra, Bosnia and Herzegovina, Bulgaria, Corsica, Croatia, Cyprus, Greece, Italy, Malta, Portugal, Serbia, Spain, Turkey, Austria, France, Germany, Netherlands, Switzerland, Iran, Israel, Palestine, Canary Islands, Armenia, India.
