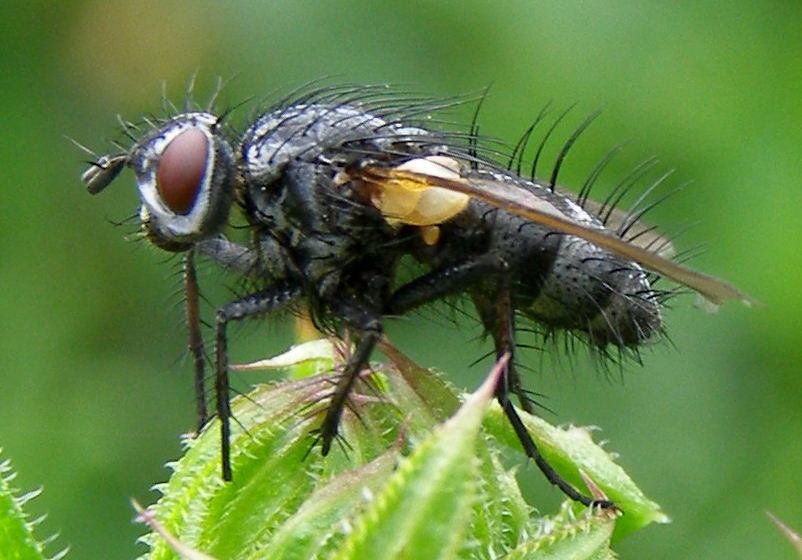
- Pelatachina tibialis

Scientific classification
- Kingdom: Animalia
- Phylum: Arthropoda
- Clade: Pancrustacea
- Class: Insecta
- Order: Diptera
- Family: Tachinidae
- Subfamily: Tachininae
- Tribe: Pelatachinini
- Genus: Pelatachina; Meade, 1894

Type species
- Pelatachina tibialis

Synonyms
- Hyria Robineau-Desvoidy, 1863; Eohyria Townsend, 1915

= Pelatachina =

Genus of flies

Pelatachina is a genus of flies in the family Tachinidae.

== Species ==
- Pelatachina limata Coquillett, 1902
- Pelatachina orillia Curran, 1927
- Pelatachina pellucida Coquillett, 1897
- Pelatachina tibialis (Fallén, 1810)
