= Macquartia viridana =

Scientific classification
- Kingdom: Animalia
- Phylum: Arthropoda
- Clade: Pancrustacea
- Class: Insecta
- Order: Diptera
- Family: Tachinidae
- Subfamily: Tachininae
- Tribe: Macquartiini
- Genus: Macquartia
- Species: M. viridana

Binomial name
- Macquartia viridana Robineau-Desvoidy, 1863

Synonyms
- Tachina orbilius Walker, 1849; Chrysosoma rufipes Macquart, 1848; Macquartia dispar Robineau-Desvoidy, 1863; Macquartia maculifemur Strobl, 1910

Species of fly

Macquartia viridana is a European species of fly in the family Tachinidae.

== Distribution ==
British Isles, Czech Republic, Hungary, Poland, Romania, Slovakia, Ukraine, Bulgaria, Italy, Serbia, Spain, Austria, Belgium, France, Germany, Netherlands, Switzerland, Russia, China.
