= Macquartia hystrix =

Scientific classification
- Kingdom: Animalia
- Phylum: Arthropoda
- Clade: Pancrustacea
- Class: Insecta
- Order: Diptera
- Family: Tachinidae
- Subfamily: Tachininae
- Tribe: Macquartiini
- Genus: Macquartia
- Species: M. hystrix

Binomial name
- Macquartia hystrix Mesnil, 1972

Species of fly

Macquartia hystrix is a European species of fly in the family Tachinidae.

== Distribution ==
France.
