= Macquartia macularis =

Scientific classification
- Kingdom: Animalia
- Phylum: Arthropoda
- Clade: Pancrustacea
- Class: Insecta
- Order: Diptera
- Family: Tachinidae
- Subfamily: Tachininae
- Tribe: Macquartiini
- Genus: Macquartia
- Species: M. macularis

Binomial name
- Macquartia macularis Villeneuve, 1926

Species of fly

Macquartia macularis is a European species of fly in the family Tachinidae.

== Distribution ==
Czech Republic, Slovakia, Ukraine, Albania, Switzerland, Mongolia, Morocco, Tunisia, China
