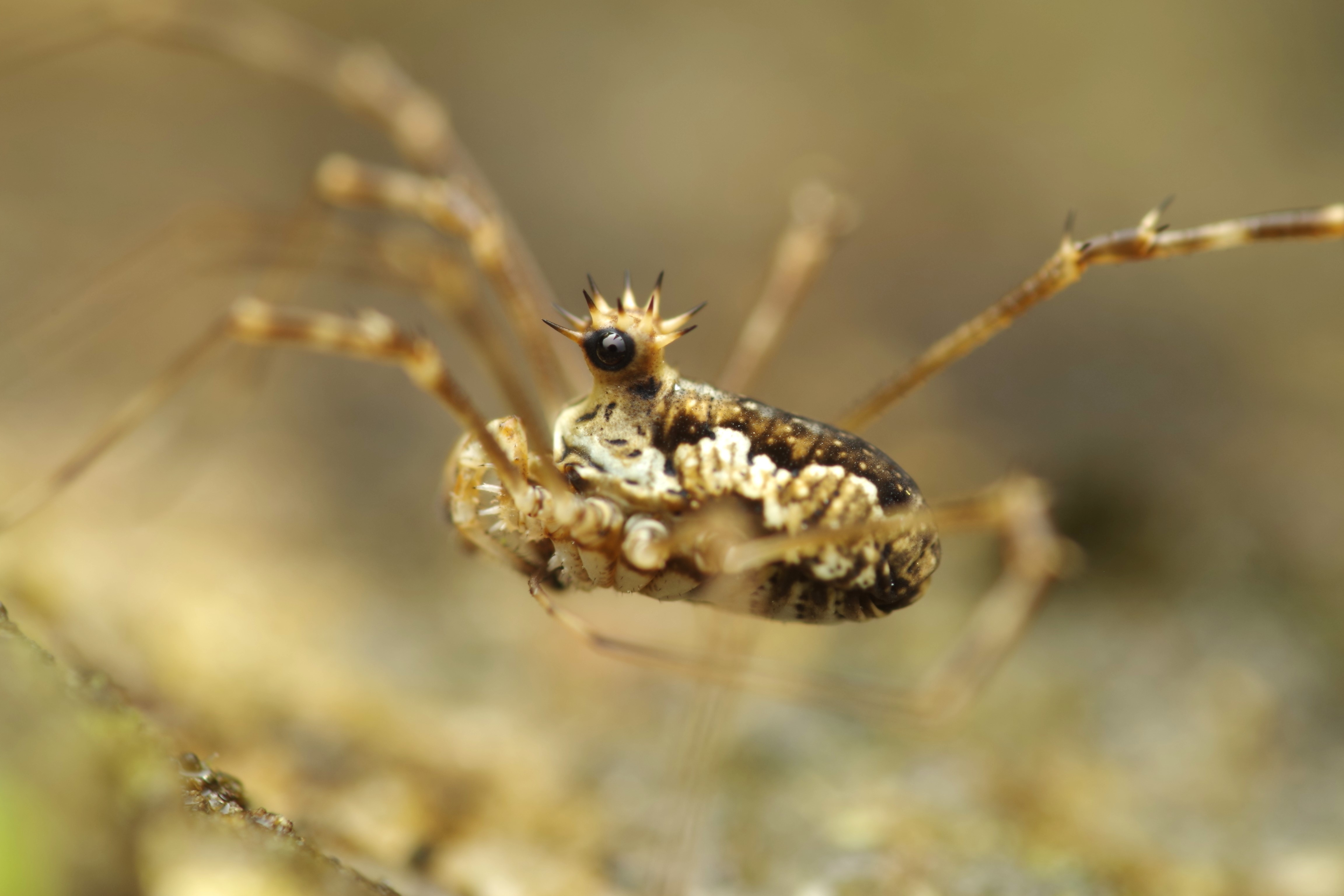
- Megabunus diadema

Scientific classification
- Kingdom: Animalia
- Phylum: Arthropoda
- Subphylum: Chelicerata
- Class: Arachnida
- Order: Opiliones
- Family: Phalangiidae
- Genus: Megabunus; Meade, 1855

Type species
- Megabunus insignis Meade, 1855

Species
- See text.

Diversity
- 6 species

= Megabunus =

Genus of harvestmen/daddy longlegs

Megabunus is a genus of harvestmen in the family Phalangiidae. All occur in Europe, mostly in the vicinity of the Alps.

In Megabunus, the pedipalps are armed with strong ventral spines, especially on the femur, probably to hold fast to prey.

== Name ==
The genus name is derived from Ancient Greek mega "big" and -bunus, which is a common ending for certain opilionid genera.

== Species ==
There are eleven recognized species:

- Megabunus armatus (Kulczyński, 1887) (Tirols, Slovenia)
- Megabunus bergomas Chemini, 1985 (Italy)
- Megabunus coelodonta Muster & Steiner, 2015 (Western Alps)
- Megabunus cryptobergomas Muster & Wachter, 2015 (Northern Italy)
- Megabunus diadema (Fabricius, 1779) (Western Europe)
- Megabunus hadzii (Kratochvíl, 1935)
- Megabunus lentipes Muster & Komposch, 2015 (Western Alps)
- Megabunus lesserti Schenkel, 1927 (Germany, Austria, Switzerland; possibly a variation of M. armatus)
- Megabunus pifkoi Murányi, 2008
- Megabunus rhinoceros (Canestrini, 1872) (Swiss Alps)
- Megabunus vignai Martens, 1978 (Italy)
