= Macquartia nudigena =

Scientific classification
- Kingdom: Animalia
- Phylum: Arthropoda
- Clade: Pancrustacea
- Class: Insecta
- Order: Diptera
- Family: Tachinidae
- Subfamily: Tachininae
- Tribe: Macquartiini
- Genus: Macquartia
- Species: M. nudigena

Binomial name
- Macquartia nudigena Mesnil, 1972

Species of fly

Macquartia nudigena is a European species of fly in the family Tachinidae.

== Distribution ==
British Isles, Czech Republic, Estonia, Hungary, Poland, Slovakia, Denmark, Finland, Norway, Sweden, Italy, Serbia, Austria, Belgium, France, Germany, Switzerland, Russia, China.
