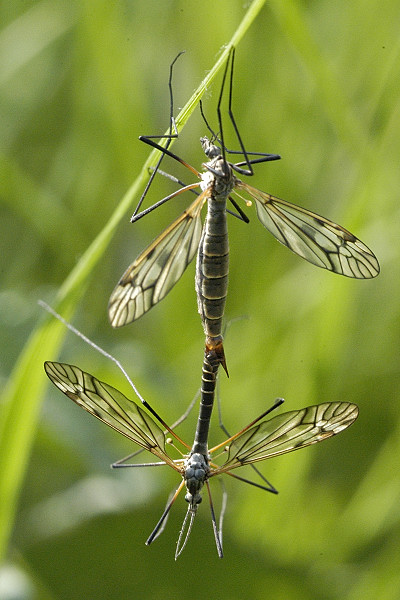

Scientific classification
- Kingdom: Animalia
- Phylum: Arthropoda
- Clade: Pancrustacea
- Class: Insecta
- Order: Diptera
- Family: Tipulidae
- Genus: Tipula
- Subgenus: Vestiplex
- Species: T. nubeculosa

Binomial name
- Tipula nubeculosa Meigen, 1804

Synonyms
- Tipula rubripes Schummel, 1833; Tipula guttulifera Zetterstedt, 1838; Tipula pseudoscripta Pierre, 1921

= Tipula nubeculosa =

Species of fly

Tipula nubeculosa is a species of cranefly. It is widespread throughout the Palaearctic, including Belgium where it can be found living in damp forest habitats. Tipula nubeculosa can reach lengths of 17-30 mm, with a wingspan of 18-23 mm. T. nubeculosa is a host species for the parasitic larvae of Admontia grandicornis.
