= Macquartia chalconota =

Scientific classification
- Kingdom: Animalia
- Phylum: Arthropoda
- Clade: Pancrustacea
- Class: Insecta
- Order: Diptera
- Family: Tachinidae
- Subfamily: Tachininae
- Tribe: Macquartiini
- Genus: Macquartia
- Species: M. chalconota

Binomial name
- Macquartia chalconota (Meigen, 1824)

Synonyms
- Macquartia germanica Robineau-Desvoidy, 1830; Macquartia major Schiner, 1861; Tachina chalconota Meigen, 1824

Species of fly

Macquartia chalconota is a European species of fly in the family Tachinidae.

== Distribution ==
Czech Republic, Hungary, Moldova, Poland, Romania, Slovakia, Ukraine, Sweden, Andorra, Bosnia and Herzegovina, Bulgaria, Croatia, Greece, Italy, Portugal, Serbia, Spain, Turkey, Austria, Belgium, France, Germany, Netherlands, Switzerland, Iran, Russia, Transcaucasia, China.
