= Macroprosopa =

Scientific classification
- Kingdom: Animalia
- Phylum: Arthropoda
- Class: Insecta
- Order: Diptera
- Family: Tachinidae
- Subfamily: Tachininae
- Tribe: Macquartiini
- Genus: Macroprosopa; Brauer & von Berganstamm, 1889

Type species
- Tachina atrata Fallén, 1810

Genus of flies

Macroprosopa is a genus of flies in the family Tachinidae.

== Species ==
- Macroprosopa atrata (Fallén, 1810)

== Distribution ==
Czech Republic, Poland, Romania, Slovakia, Denmark, Finland, Sweden, Bulgaria, Italy, Spain, Austria, Belgium, France, Germany, Netherlands, Switzerland, Mongolia, Russia, Transcaucasia.
