= Anthomyiopsis nigrisquamata =

Scientific classification
- Kingdom: Animalia
- Phylum: Arthropoda
- Clade: Pancrustacea
- Class: Insecta
- Order: Diptera
- Family: Tachinidae
- Genus: Anthomyiopsis
- Species: A. nigrisquamata

Binomial name
- Anthomyiopsis nigrisquamata (Zetterstedt, 1838)

Synonyms
- Tachina nigrisquamata Zetterstedt, 1838; Tachina nitens Zetterstedt, 1853

Species of fly

Anthomyiopsis nigrisquamata is a European species of fly in the family Tachinidae.
