= Pseudebenia =

Scientific classification
- Kingdom: Animalia
- Phylum: Arthropoda
- Class: Insecta
- Order: Diptera
- Family: Tachinidae
- Subfamily: Tachininae
- Tribe: Macquartiini
- Genus: Pseudebenia; Shima, Han & Tachi, 2010

Type species
- Pseudebenia epilachnae Shima & Tachi, 2010

Genus of flies

Pseudebenia is a genus of flies in the family Tachinidae.

== Species ==
- Pseudebenia argyrosoma Shima & Tachi, 2010
- Pseudebenia epilachnae Shima & Han, 2010
- Pseudebenia fulvipalpis Shima & Tachi, 2010
- Pseudebenia fuscata Shima & Tachi, 2010
- Pseudebenia nepalensis Shima & Tachi, 2010
- Pseudebenia trisetosa Shima & Tachi, 2010
