= Eriothrix micronyx =

Scientific classification
- Kingdom: Animalia
- Phylum: Arthropoda
- Class: Insecta
- Order: Diptera
- Family: Tachinidae
- Subfamily: Dexiinae
- Tribe: Voriini
- Genus: Eriothrix
- Species: E. micronyx

Binomial name
- Eriothrix micronyx Stein, 1924

Synonyms
- Eriothrix zimini Kolomiets, 1967

Species of fly

Eriothrix micronyx is a species of fly in the family Tachinidae.

== Distribution ==
China, Poland, Italy, Austria, Switzerland, Russia.
