= Brachicheta =

Scientific classification
- Kingdom: Animalia
- Phylum: Arthropoda
- Class: Insecta
- Order: Diptera
- Family: Tachinidae
- Subfamily: Exoristinae
- Tribe: Goniini
- Genus: Brachicheta; Rondani, 1861

Type species
- Frontina spinigera Rondani, 1861

Synonyms
- Brachychaeta Bezzi, 1907

Genus of flies

Brachicheta is a genus of flies in the family Tachinidae.

== Species ==
- Brachicheta petiolata Mesnil, 1953
- Brachicheta strigata (Meigen, 1824)
