= Anthomyiopsis nigra =

Scientific classification
- Domain: Eukaryota
- Kingdom: Animalia
- Phylum: Arthropoda
- Class: Insecta
- Order: Diptera
- Family: Tachinidae
- Genus: Anthomyiopsis
- Species: A. nigra

Binomial name
- Anthomyiopsis nigra (Baranov, 1838)

Species of fly

Anthomyiopsis nigra is a species of fly first described by Baranov in 1938. It is part of the genus Anthomyiopsis and the family Tachinidae. It is distributed in Uttar Pradesh, India. No subspecies are listed in the Catalogue of Life.
