= Admontia seria =

Scientific classification
- Kingdom: Animalia
- Phylum: Arthropoda
- Class: Insecta
- Order: Diptera
- Family: Tachinidae
- Subfamily: Exoristinae
- Tribe: Blondeliini
- Genus: Admontia
- Species: A. seria

Binomial name
- Admontia seria (Meigen, 1824)

Synonyms
- Tachina decorata Zetterstedt, 1849; Tachina seria Meigen, 1824

Species of fly

Admontia seria is a species of fly in the family Tachinidae.

== Distribution ==
British Isles, Czech Republic, Lithuania, Poland, Romania, Slovakia, Ukraine, Denmark, Finland, Sweden, Italy, Austria, France, Germany, Netherlands, Switzerland, Russia.
