= Gonatorrhina =

Scientific classification
- Kingdom: Animalia
- Phylum: Arthropoda
- Class: Insecta
- Order: Diptera
- Family: Tachinidae
- Subfamily: Tachininae
- Tribe: Macquartiini
- Genus: Gonatorrhina; Röder, 1886

Type species
- Gonatorrhina paramonensis Röder, 1886

Genus of flies

Gonatorrhina is a genus of flies in the family Tachinidae.

== Species ==
- Gonatorrhina paramonensis Röder, 1886

== Distribution ==
Colombia
