= Eriothrix apenninus =

Scientific classification
- Kingdom: Animalia
- Phylum: Arthropoda
- Class: Insecta
- Order: Diptera
- Family: Tachinidae
- Subfamily: Dexiinae
- Tribe: Voriini
- Genus: Eriothrix
- Species: E. apenninus

Binomial name
- Eriothrix apenninus (Rondani, 1862)

Synonyms
- Olivieria latifrons Brauer, 1898; Rhynchista apennina Rondani, 1862

Species of fly

Eriothrix apenninus is a species of fly in the family Tachinidae.

== Distribution ==
Czech Republic, Hungary, Poland, Romania, Slovakia, Ukraine, Bulgaria, Croatia, Italy, Portugal, Serbia, Spain, Turkey, Austria, France, Kazakhstan, Iran, Israel, Palestine, Mongolia, Morocco, Russia, China, Transcaucasia.
