= Anthomyiopsis plagioderae =

Scientific classification
- Kingdom: Animalia
- Phylum: Arthropoda
- Clade: Pancrustacea
- Class: Insecta
- Order: Diptera
- Family: Tachinidae
- Genus: Anthomyiopsis
- Species: A. plagioderae

Binomial name
- Anthomyiopsis plagioderae Mesnil, 1972

Species of fly

Anthomyiopsis plagioderae is a European species of flies in the family Tachinidae.
