= Eriothrix argyreatus =

Scientific classification
- Kingdom: Animalia
- Phylum: Arthropoda
- Class: Insecta
- Order: Diptera
- Family: Tachinidae
- Subfamily: Dexiinae
- Tribe: Voriini
- Genus: Eriothrix
- Species: E. argyreatus

Binomial name
- Eriothrix argyreatus (Meigen, 1824)

Synonyms
- Eriothrix paramonovi Belanovsky, 1929; Panzeria aperta Egger, 1855; Tachina argyreatus Meigen, 1824

Species of fly

Eriothrix argyreatus is a species of fly in the family Tachinidae.

== Distribution ==
Czech Republic, Hungary, Poland, Romania, Slovakia, Ukraine, Denmark, Sweden, Bulgaria, Italy, Serbia, Austria, France, Germany, Netherlands, Switzerland, Kazakhstan, Israel, Mongolia, Russia, China, Transcaucasia.
