= Admontia maculisquama =

Scientific classification
- Kingdom: Animalia
- Phylum: Arthropoda
- Class: Insecta
- Order: Diptera
- Family: Tachinidae
- Subfamily: Exoristinae
- Tribe: Blondeliini
- Genus: Admontia
- Species: A. maculisquama

Binomial name
- Admontia maculisquama (Zetterstedt, 1859)

Synonyms
- Tachina maculisquama Zetterstedt, 1859

Species of fly

Admontia maculisquama is a species of fly in the family Tachinidae.

== Distribution ==
British Isles, Czech Republic, Hungary, Moldova, Poland, Slovakia, Ukraine, Denmark, Sweden, Bosnia and Herzegovina, Bulgaria, Italy, Serbia, Spain, Austria, Belgium, France, Germany, Netherlands, Switzerland, Russia, Armenia.
