= Eriothrix umbrinervis =

Scientific classification
- Kingdom: Animalia
- Phylum: Arthropoda
- Class: Insecta
- Order: Diptera
- Family: Tachinidae
- Subfamily: Dexiinae
- Tribe: Voriini
- Genus: Eriothrix
- Species: E. umbrinervis

Binomial name
- Eriothrix umbrinervis Mesnil, 1957

Synonyms
- Eriothrix mesnii Kolomiets, 1967; Eriothrix tragicus Kolomiets, 1967

Species of fly

Eriothrix umbrinervis is a species of fly in the family Tachinidae.

== Distribution ==
China, Japan, North Korea, Mongolia, Russia.
