= Brachicheta petiolata =

Scientific classification
- Kingdom: Animalia
- Phylum: Arthropoda
- Class: Insecta
- Order: Diptera
- Family: Tachinidae
- Genus: Brachicheta
- Species: B. petiolata

Binomial name
- Brachicheta petiolata (Mesnil, 1953)

Species of fly

Brachicheta petiolata is a species of fly in the family Tachinidae. It is located in Turkey, Iran, Israel, Armenia, and Azerbaijan.
