= Paralypha =

Scientific classification
- Kingdom: Animalia
- Phylum: Arthropoda
- Class: Insecta
- Order: Diptera
- Family: Tachinidae
- Subfamily: Tachininae
- Tribe: Pelatachinini
- Genus: Paralypha; Mesnil, 1963

Type species
- Paralypha aberrans Mesnil, 1963

Genus of flies

Paralypha is a genus of flies in the family Tachinidae.

== Species ==
- Paralypha aberrans Mesnil, 1963

== Distribution ==
Tajikistan
