= Anthomyiopsis =

Scientific classification
- Kingdom: Animalia
- Phylum: Arthropoda
- Class: Insecta
- Order: Diptera
- Family: Tachinidae
- Subfamily: Tachininae
- Tribe: Macquartiini
- Genus: Anthomyiopsis; Townsend, 1916

Type species
- Anthomyiopsis cypseloides Townsend, 1916

Synonyms
- Plagioderophagus Baranov, 1938; Ptilopsina Villeneuve, 1920

Genus of flies

Anthomyiopsis is a genus of flies in the family Tachinidae.

== Species ==
- Anthomyiopsis cypseloides Townsend, 1916
- Anthomyiopsis nigra (Baranov, 1938)
- Anthomyiopsis nigrisquamata (Zetterstedt, 1838)
- Anthomyiopsis plagioderae Mesnil, 1972
