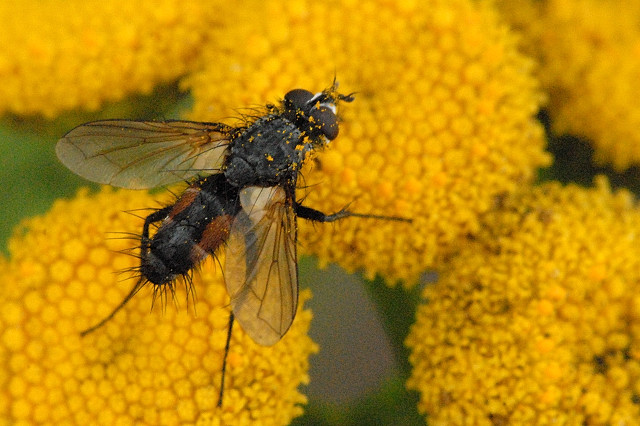
- Male
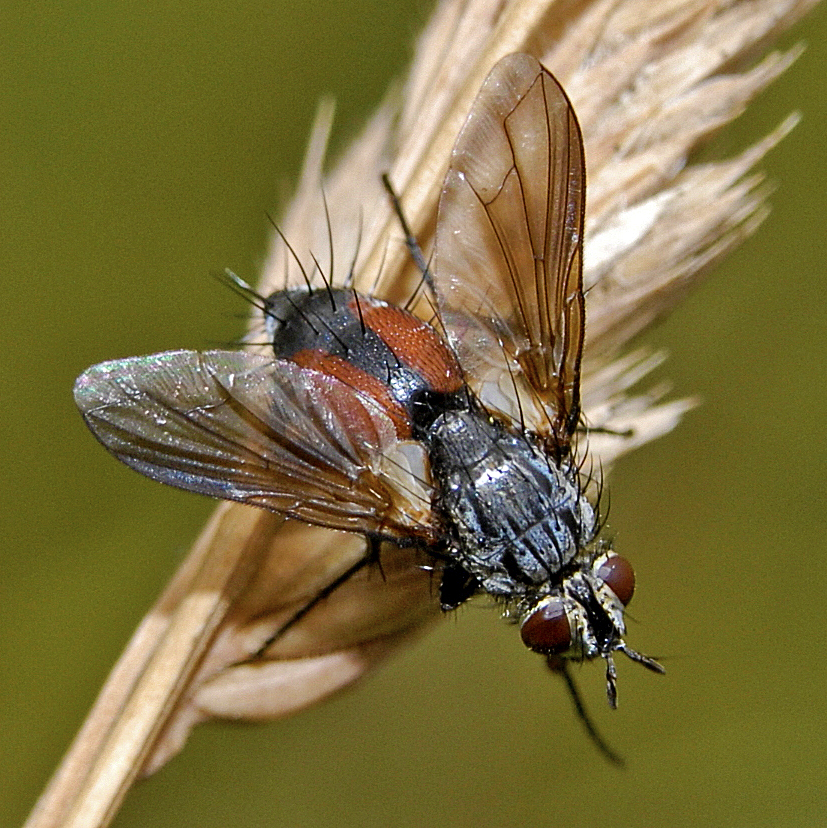
- Female

Scientific classification
- Kingdom: Animalia
- Phylum: Arthropoda
- Class: Insecta
- Order: Diptera
- Family: Tachinidae
- Subfamily: Dexiinae
- Tribe: Voriini
- Genus: Eriothrix
- Species: E. rufomaculatus

Binomial name
- Eriothrix rufomaculatus (De Geer, 1776)

Synonyms
- Eriothrix monochaeta Wainwright, 1928; Musca dimano Harris, 1780; Musca lateralis Fabricius, 1775; Musca rufomaculata De Geer, 1776; Ocyptera tachinaria Fallén, 1815

= Eriothrix rufomaculata =

Species of fly

Eriothrix rufomaculatus is a species of fly in the family Tachinidae.

== Distribution ==
Turkmenistan, Uzbekistan, China, British Isles, Czech Republic, Estonia, Hungary, Latvia, Moldova, Poland, Romania, Slovakia, Ukraine, Denmark, Finland, Norway, Sweden, Bosnia and Herzegovina, Bulgaria, Croatia, Greece, Italy, Macedonia, Portugal, Serbia, Slovenia, Spain, Turkey, Austria, Belgium, Channel Islands, France, Germany, Netherlands, Switzerland, Kazakhstan, North Korea, Iran, Israel, Palestine, Russia, Azerbaijan.

== Habitat ==
These rather common flies mainly inhabit hedge rows, grasslands or sunny rough ground, meadows, ruderal areas and fields.

== Description ==
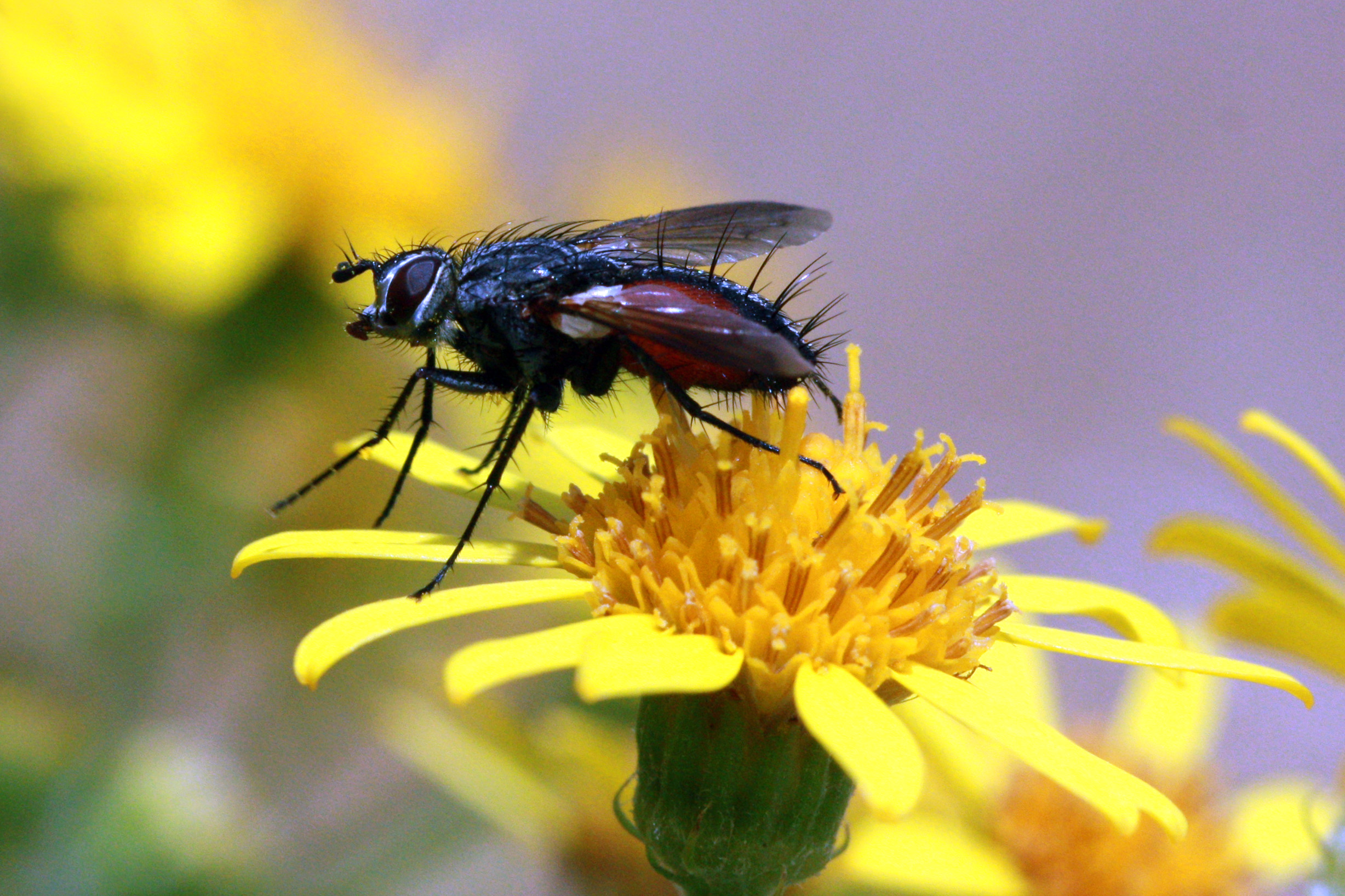
Side view

Eriothrix rufomaculatus can reach a length of 5–10 millimetres (0.20–0.39 in) and a wingspan of 13–15 mm. This bristly species shows a greyish thorax with four narrow black stripes and a prominent but quite variable orange patches on the sides of its cylindrical abdomen, separated by a dorsal black line. Its face is silvery, with a protruding mouth edge. The legs are black. Wings are slightly shaded, yellowish at the base. Vein-m is petiolate and costal spine is longer than vein r-m.

== Biology ==
Eriothrix rufomaculatus is a univoltine species. Adults can be found from July to October. They are flower feeders, visiting in particular members of the Umbelliferae (especially Heracleum sphondylium) and Asteraceae. The species is parasitic, the larvae developing inside the subterranean larvae of moths, especially of crambid moths (Chrysoteuchia culmella, Crambidae), tiger moths (Ammobiota festiva, Erebidae), lappet moths (Dendrolimus pini, Lasiocampidae) and ermine moths (Yponomeutidae)).

Eriothrix rufomaculatus feeding on flower nectar (video, 1m 6s)
