= Admontia stackelbergi =

Scientific classification
- Kingdom: Animalia
- Phylum: Arthropoda
- Class: Insecta
- Order: Diptera
- Family: Tachinidae
- Subfamily: Exoristinae
- Tribe: Blondeliini
- Genus: Admontia
- Species: A. stackelbergi

Binomial name
- Admontia stackelbergi (Mesnil, 1963)

Synonyms
- Trichoparia stackelbergi Mesnil, 1963

Species of fly

Admontia stackelbergi is a species of fly in the family Tachinidae.

== Distribution ==
Poland, Russia.
