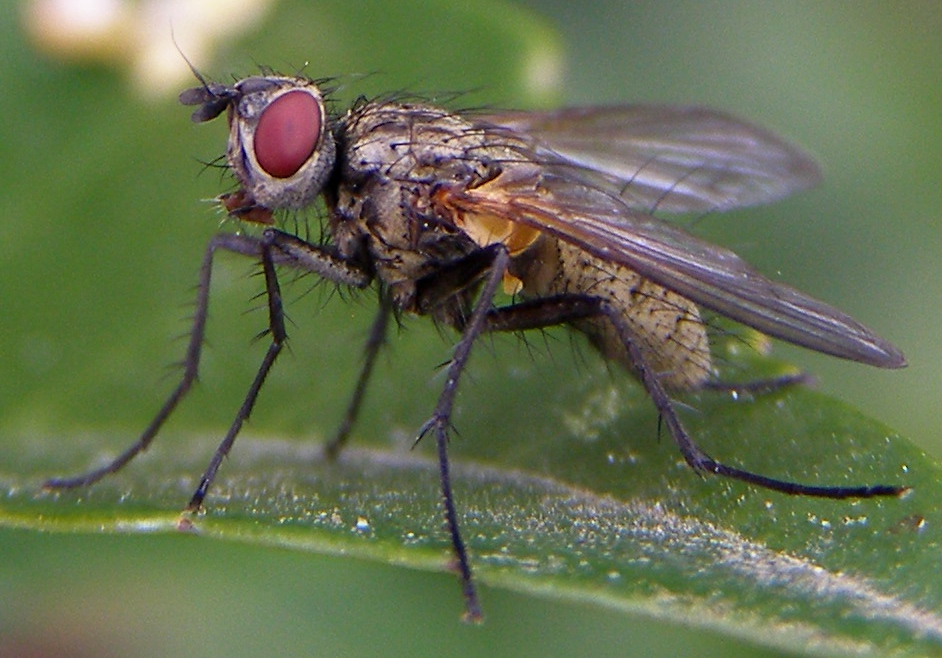
- Female Macquartia grisea

Scientific classification
- Kingdom: Animalia
- Phylum: Arthropoda
- Class: Insecta
- Order: Diptera
- Family: Tachinidae
- Subfamily: Tachininae
- Tribe: Macquartiini
- Genus: Macquartia; Robineau-Desvoidy, 1830

Type species
- Macquartia rubripes Robineau-Desvoidy, 1830

Synonyms
- Alaskophyto Townsend, 1915; Albiniola Mesnil, 1972; Arraltia Robineau-Desvoidy, 1863; Bebricia Robineau-Desvoidy, 1863; Gymnopsis Rondani, 1859; Hesione Robineau-Desvoidy, 1863; Hesionella Mesnil, 1972; Javetia Robineau-Desvoidy, 1863; Maquartia Rondani, 1862; Minella Robineau-Desvoidy, 1830; Myioclonia Reinhard, 1945; Olbya Robineau-Desvoidy, 1863; Pherecida Robineau-Desvoidy, 1863; Proteremoplax Enderlein, 1936; Ptylops Rondani, 1859

= Macquartia =

Genus of flies

Macquartia is a genus of flies in the family Tachinidae.

== Species ==
- Macquartia aeneiventris Emden, 1960
- Macquartia albertana (Reinhard, 1945)
- Macquartia brunneisquama Zhang & Li, 2022
- Macquartia catskillensis (West, 1925)
- Macquartia chalconota (Meigen, 1824)
- Macquartia chinensis Zhang & Li, 2022
- Macquartia dispar (Fallén, 1820)
- Macquartia erythrocera (Reinhard, 1945)
- Macquartia erythromera Emden, 1960
- Macquartia flavifemorata Zhang & Li, 2022
- Macquartia flavipedicel Zhang & Li, 2022
- Macquartia grisea (Fallén, 1810)
- Macquartia hystrix Mesnil, 1972
- Macquartia macularis Villeneuve, 1926
- Macquartia nigricornis (Reinhard, 1945)
- Macquartia nitidicollis Emden, 1960
- Macquartia nudigena Mesnil, 1972
- Macquartia obscura (Coquillett, 1902)
- Macquartia pegomyioides Richter & Wood, 1995
- Macquartia plumbea Richter & Wood, 1995
- Macquartia plumbella Villeneuve, 1942
- Macquartia praefica (Meigen, 1824)
- Macquartia pubiceps (Zetterstedt, 1845)
- Macquartia rufipalpis (Curran, 1927)
- Macquartia tenebricosa (Meigen, 1824)
- Macquartia tessellata Emden, 1960
- Macquartia tessellum (Meigen, 1824)
- Macquartia uniseriata Emden, 1960
- Macquartia viridana Robineau-Desvoidy, 1863
