= Porphyromus =

Scientific classification
- Kingdom: Animalia
- Phylum: Arthropoda
- Class: Insecta
- Order: Diptera
- Family: Tachinidae
- Subfamily: Tachininae
- Tribe: Macquartiini
- Genus: Porphyromus; Emden, 1960

Type species
- Porphyromus caeruleiventris Emden, 1960

Genus of flies

Porphyromus is a genus of flies in the family Tachinidae.

== Species ==
- Porphyromus caeruleiventris Emden, 1960

== Distribution ==
Kenya.
