= Admontia degeerioides =

Scientific classification
- Kingdom: Animalia
- Phylum: Arthropoda
- Class: Insecta
- Order: Diptera
- Family: Tachinidae
- Subfamily: Exoristinae
- Tribe: Blondeliini
- Genus: Admontia
- Species: A. degeerioides

Binomial name
- Admontia degeerioides (Coquillett, 1895)

Synonyms
- Hyperecteina aestivalis West, 1925; Hyperecteina bishopi West, 1925; Hypostena degeerioides Coquillett, 1895

Species of fly

Admontia degeerioides is a species of fly in the family Tachinidae.

== Distribution ==
Canada, United States.
