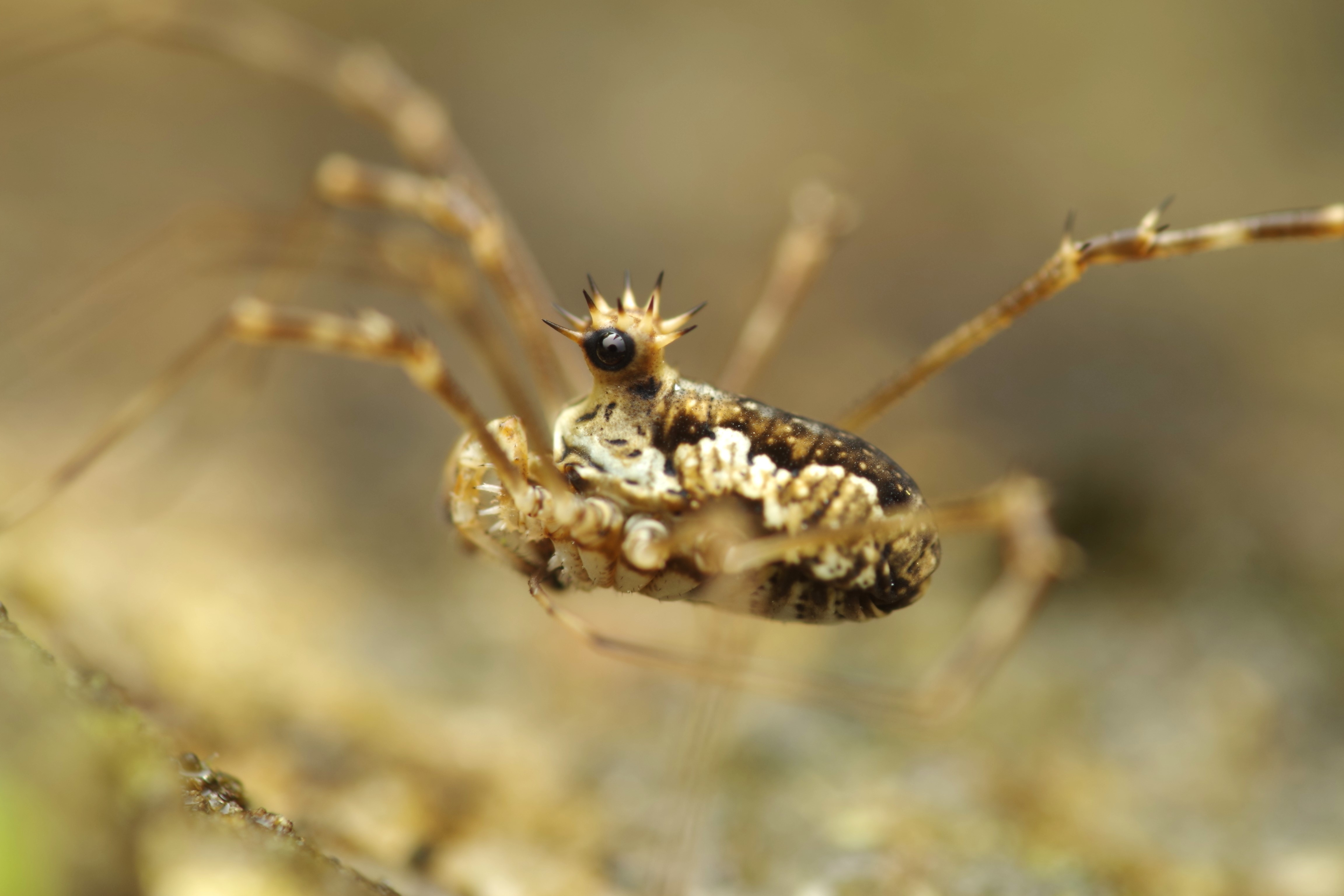

Scientific classification
- Kingdom: Animalia
- Phylum: Arthropoda
- Subphylum: Chelicerata
- Class: Arachnida
- Order: Opiliones
- Family: Phalangiidae
- Genus: Megabunus
- Species: M. diadema

Binomial name
- Megabunus diadema (Fabricius, 1779)

Synonyms
- Phalangium diadema Fabricius, 1779; Opilio diadema (Fabricius, 1779); Megabunus grouvellei Simon, 1881; Megabunus insignis Meade, 1855

= Megabunus diadema =

Species of harvestman/daddy longlegs

Megabunus diadema is a species of harvestman in the family Phalangiidae. It is distributed in Western Europe, where it has been found in Iceland, Faroe Islands, Western Norway, Great Britain, Western France, Belgium and Northern Spain.

It is commonly found among moss and lichens, and has a cryptic coloration that blends with this habitat, rendering it almost invisible when it is not moving. Its second pair of legs is as long as 35 mm. Its prominent pair of eyes is equipped with a spiny "crown".

M. diadema was shown to feed on chironomid flies.

The gregarines Actinocephalus megabuni and Doliospora repelini (Eugregarinorida), and the mite Leptus beroni were found to parasitize on this species.

During a study of woodland in Scotland, they were found to be most active during March, June to July and December; in montane regions of Wales they only occurred in August, while they were found all year round in English woodland, with a peak from May to August.

The mainly parthenogenetic M. diadema lays three batches of eggs per year, with about 30 eggs per batch that are deposited among leaf litter or on the soil. The larvae, like many in the suborder Eupnoi, have an egg tooth.

Males have 28 chromosomes.
