= Lafuentemyia =

Scientific classification
- Kingdom: Animalia
- Phylum: Arthropoda
- Class: Insecta
- Order: Diptera
- Family: Tachinidae
- Subfamily: Tachininae
- Tribe: Macquartiini
- Genus: Lafuentemyia; Marnef, 1965

Type species
- Lafuentemyia yanezi Marnef, 1965

Genus of flies

Lafuentemyia is a genus of flies in the family Tachinidae.

== Species ==
- Lafuentemyia yanezi Marnef, 1965

== Distribution ==
Chile.
