= Chyuluella =

Scientific classification
- Kingdom: Animalia
- Phylum: Arthropoda
- Class: Insecta
- Order: Diptera
- Family: Tachinidae
- Subfamily: Tachininae
- Tribe: Macquartiini
- Genus: Chyuluella; Emden, 1960

Type species
- Chyuluella cribata Emden, 1960

Genus of flies

Chyuluella is a genus of flies in the family Tachinidae.

== Species ==
- Chyuluella cribata Emden, 1960

== Distribution ==
Kenya.
