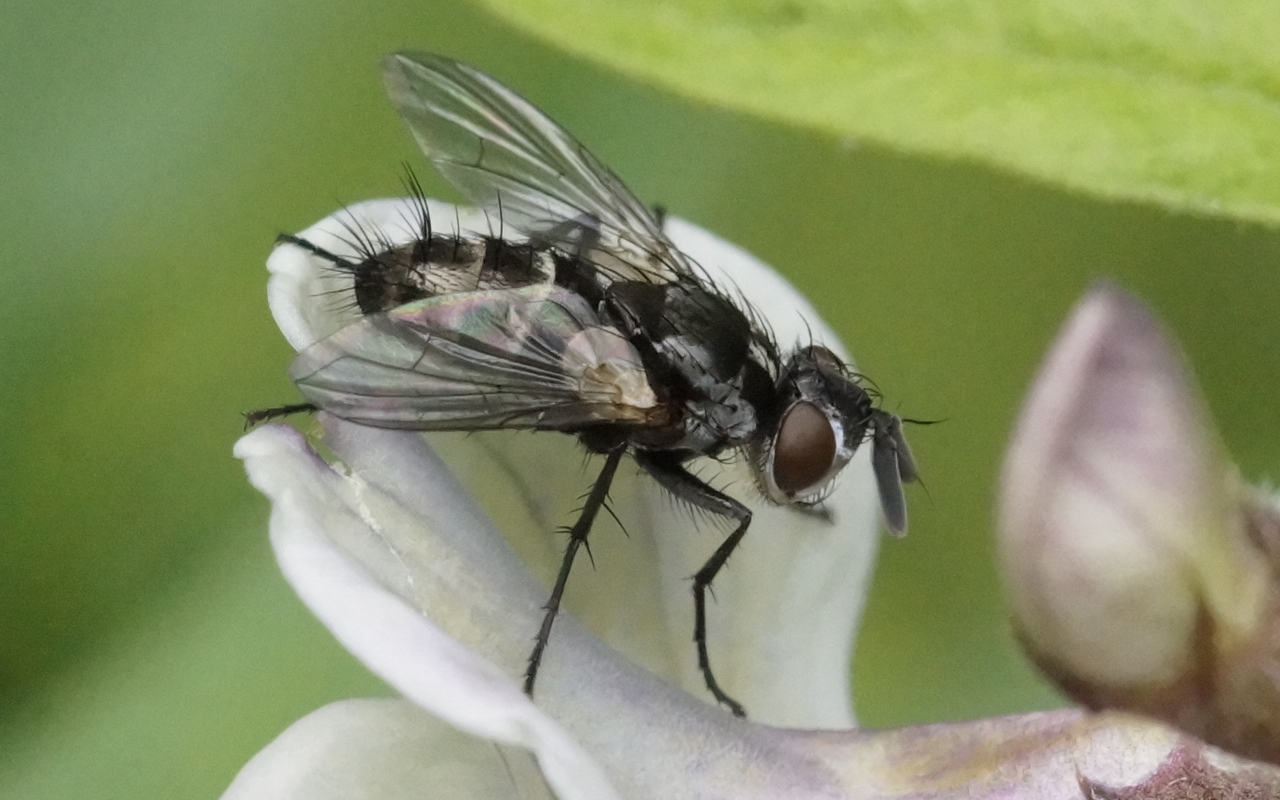

Scientific classification
- Kingdom: Animalia
- Phylum: Arthropoda
- Class: Insecta
- Order: Diptera
- Family: Tachinidae
- Subfamily: Exoristinae
- Tribe: Blondeliini
- Genus: Admontia
- Species: A. blanda

Binomial name
- Admontia blanda (Fallén, 1820)

Synonyms
- Tachina blanda Fallén, 1820; Tachina pulchella Meigen, 1824

= Admontia blanda =

Species of fly

Admontia blanda is a species of fly in the family Tachinidae.

== Distribution ==
British Isles, Czech Republic, Estonia, Hungary, Poland, Romania, Slovakia, Denmark, Finland, Norway, Sweden, Bosnia and Herzegovina, Italy, Spain, Austria, Belgium, France, Germany, Netherlands, Switzerland, Mongolia, Russia, Transcaucasia, China.
