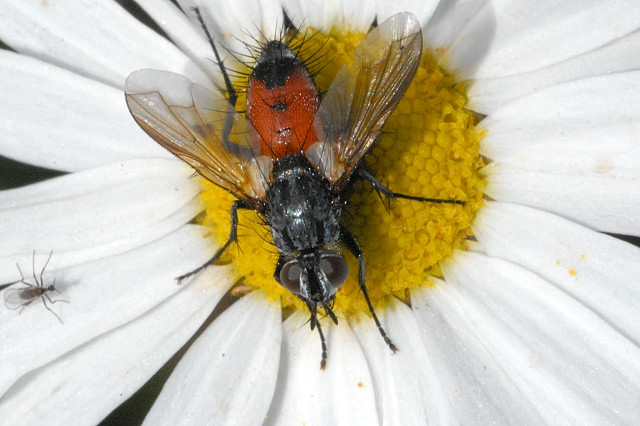
- Eriothrix rufomaculata female

Scientific classification
- Kingdom: Animalia
- Phylum: Arthropoda
- Class: Insecta
- Order: Diptera
- Family: Tachinidae
- Subfamily: Dexiinae
- Tribe: Voriini
- Genus: Eriothrix; Meigen, 1803

Type species
- Musca lateralis Fabricius, 1775

Synonyms
- Eriothryx Schiner, 1868; Erithorix Townsend, 1911; Mangazea Draber-Monko & Kolomiets, 1982; Olivieria Robineau-Desvoidy, 1830; Proboscina Rondani, 1856; Pyraustomyia Townsend, 1916

= Eriothrix =

Genus of flies

Eriothrix is a genus of flies in the family Tachinidae.

== Species ==
- Eriothrix accolus Kolomiets, 1967
- Eriothrix apenninus (Rondani, 1862)
- Eriothrix argyreatus (Meigen, 1824)
- Eriothrix furvus Kolomiets, 1967
- Eriothrix inflatus Kolomiets, 1967
- Eriothrix micronyx Stein, 1924
- Eriothrix monticola (Egger, 1856)
- Eriothrix nasutus Kolomiets, 1967
- Eriothrix nitidus Kolomiets, 1967
- Eriothrix penitalis (Coquillett, 1897)
- Eriothrix prolixa (Meigen, 1824)
- Eriothrix rohdendorfi Kolomiets, 1967
- Eriothrix rufomaculatus (De Geer, 1776)
- Eriothrix sledzinskii (Draber-Monko & Kolomiets, 1982)
- Eriothrix stackelbergi Kolomiets, 1967
- Eriothrix umbrinervis Mesnil, 1957
