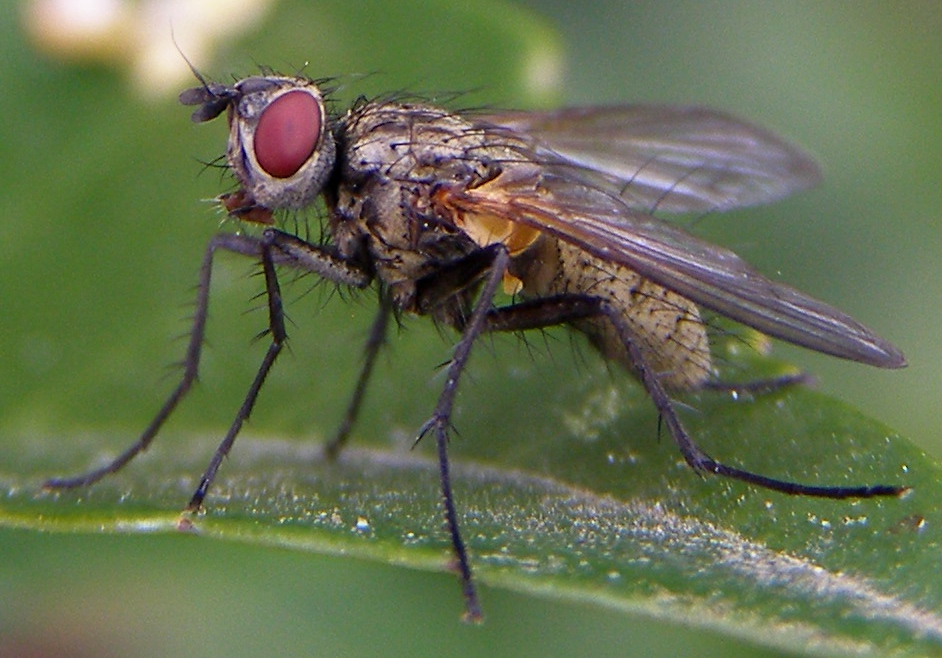
- Female Macquartia grisea

Scientific classification
- Kingdom: Animalia
- Phylum: Arthropoda
- Clade: Pancrustacea
- Class: Insecta
- Order: Diptera
- Family: Tachinidae
- Subfamily: Tachininae
- Tribe: Macquartiini
- Genus: Macquartia
- Species: M. grisea

Binomial name
- Macquartia grisea (Fallén, 1810)

Synonyms
- Tachina grisea Fallén, 1810; Tachina egens Meigen, 1824; Tachina vetusta Meigen, 1824; Macquartia flavescens Robineau-Desvoidy, 1830; Pherecida agraria Robineau-Desvoidy, 1863; Macquartia longipennis Portschinsky, 1881

= Macquartia grisea =

Species of fly

Macquartia grisea is a European species of fly in the family Tachinidae.

== Ecology ==
Macquartia grisea is an endoparasitoid of the leaf beetle Chrysolina fastuosa.

== Distribution ==
British Isles, Czech Republic, Hungary, Poland, Romania, Slovakia, Ukraine, Denmark, Sweden, Bosnia and Herzegovina, Bulgaria, Italy, Portugal, Serbia, Spain, Austria, Belgium, France, Germany, Netherlands, Switzerland, Iran, Russia, Georgia, China.
