= Gyrinicola batrachiensis =

Scientific classification
- Kingdom: Animalia
- Phylum: Nematoda
- Class: Chromadorea
- Order: Rhabditida
- Family: Pharyngodonidae
- Genus: Gyrinicola
- Species: G. batrachiensis

Binomial name
- Gyrinicola batrachiensis (Walton, 1929)

Species of roundworm

Gyrinicola batrachiensis is a species of nematode parasite in the order Oxyurida.

The life cycle of Gyrinicola batrachiensis is generally simple and direct. Adult worms live in the posterior gut of the aquatic larval stage, or tadpole, of an anuran host. The females of this species produce two types of eggs: thick-shelled eggs and thin-shelled eggs, which are produced in separate uteri. Eggs deposited by females are passed through the hosts feces into the environment. Transmission occurs when infective eggs are ingested by another host. G. batrachiensis is unique in the sense that it produces two different types of eggs to reproduce and that the parasite occurs only in the tadpole stage of its host.

== Reproduction and development ==
Members of the order Oxyurida are strictly monoxenous (one host). Females typically produce thick-shelled eggs with a sub-polar operculum. In some species, including Gyrinicola batrachiensis, eggs are deposited early into development and reach the infective stage only after passing through the feces of the host. Another hallmark of Oxyurioids is the production of two types of eggs by a didelphic female, a phenomenon known as poecilogony. Accordingly, in some oxyurids there are two types of females (poecilogyny). One female lays unembryonated, thick-shelled eggs that are involved in the transmission stage. These eggs then embryonate to third-stage in the environment. The other female produces thin-shelled eggs that contain developed larvae that embryonate in utero. These eggs are used for autoinfection. In G. batrachiensis, female worms tend to be didelphic, possessing a reproductive tract with two separate branches to allow for the production of each kind of egg. The thick-shelled eggs will come out of the dorsal horn of the uterus, and the thin-shelled ones will come out from the ventral horn. The production of two different kinds of eggs gives G. batrachiensis an advantage when it comes to colonization. As already explained, the hard-shelled eggs are passed out in the feces and allow for the colonization of other hosts. The thin-shelled eggs then embryonate in the original host in order to preserve the colonization of that host. In this manner, G. batrachiensis manages to both spread its presence in an environment and maintain all of its colonies.

This remarkably clever parasite has other reproductive adaptations that help it colonize. Haplodiploidy, in which unfertilized eggs give rise to males and fertilized eggs give rise to females, is also found in the order. This allows a single female to successfully colonize a host by parthenogenetically producing sons, which she can then mate with to produce more offspring. Also, one alternative to the haplodiploidy method of reproduction exhibited by these nematodes is reproduction by apomictic thelytoky. By this method, adult females parthenogenetically create female offspring, and males do not exist. By this manner, female nematodes are monodelphic. In this state, which is typically uncommon among G. batrachiensis, they possess a single uterus that produces thick-shelled environmentally resistant eggs that are then shed from the host. This method of reproduction occurs only in some hosts, such as Anaxyrus (=Bufo) americanus. It is assumed that the dramatic difference in each reproductive strategy may be an adaptive response to the life cycles of different host species as well as geographical location.

Typically, one type of egg is predominate in an individual female. Additionally, this species utilizes alternation of generations. Those females that are born from thin-shelled eggs produce mostly thick-shelled eggs. This assures a balance between thick and thin shelled eggs to optimize colonization. Oxyurida, in general, tend to take advantage of the amazing colonizing ability of the females. An individual female can colonize a host if she can last long enough to mate and produce offspring with parthenogenetically birthed sons. There is evidence that mother-son matings occur in these species.

Thick-shelled eggs are the transmission and dispersal stage of G. batrachiensis. After development they are deposited in the tadpole gut and passed through the feces. These eggs require about a week to reach in the infective stage, and do not hatch until ingested by the host. It is noted that some eggs of this type remain infective in the environment through winter. They are also probably involved in the spreading of G. batrachiensis from one pond to another facilitated by birds such as herons, which feed on tadpoles. Worms that have developed from the thick-shelled eggs inside the tadpoles are most likely digested by the bird, however intact eggs pass through the intestinal tract, and transmitted to the new environment through the feces.

Thin-shelled eggs, which are autoinfective, hatch and develop into adulthood within the host. They cannot be found in the feces of tadpoles and survive for a very short period of time outside of the host.

Through experimental evidence it has been determined that larvae in infected tadpoles must have developed from autoinfective thin-shelled eggs deposited by the introduced females. From this information we can conclude with relative certainty that the G. batrachiensis production of two types of eggs offers the maximum chance of survival for the species. Thin-shelled autoinfective eggs ensure that future generations of the nematode will live on within the existing host and its offspring, while thick-shelled eggs released into the environment allow G. batrachiensis to spread into other habitats to further the propagation of its members.

Other models of autoinfective behavior that simulate the larvae in infective eggs of Gyrinicola batrachiensis include larvae found free in the uterus of a female oxyuridan recovered from Amphisbaena alba from Venezuela. It is noteworthy to study the patterns of autoinfection in this parasite in relation to the patterns of autoinfection in Gyrinicola batrachiensis to serve as a comparison for differences in similarities in the production of two different kinds of eggs in parasites. Usually, members of the order Oxyurida are transmitted by thick-shelled eggs contaminating the host's environment. However, a few types of species from amphibians and lizards are known to produce two types of eggs: a thick shelled variety that must pass to the external environment - in order to complete the life cycle - and a thin-shelled variety that gives rises to an endogenous cycle, autoinfection. One unique aspect in the autoinfection methods of Amphisbaena alba is as follows: the developing larvae are not surrounded by an egg shell but lie free in the uterus; the only other Oxyurida in which an egg shell is lacking are those that exhibit autoinfective cycles. Thus far, autoinfection is known in only three oxyuridan genera; species of Gyrinicola have an autoinfective phase of their life cycle, along with Tachygonetria vivpara and species of Alaeuris. In all these genera, autoinfective generations alternate with dispersing generations; in Gyrinicola batrachiensis, females produce two eggs. One egg type tends to predominate in a given female and there is an alternation of generations such that females that develop from thin-shelled eggs, whereas those that develop from thick-shelled eggs produce predominantly thin-shelled eggs. However, in Amphisbaena alba, there are two types of females. One type produces thick-shelled eggs that must pass out of the host to continue their development and another type produces thin-shelled autoinfective eggs. Like in species of Gyrinicola, there is an alternation of generations. Thus, in all of the autoinfective oxuridans the basic pattern involves a generation of colonizing females that give rise to a second generation in the same host individual; worms of this second generation produce thick-shelled dispersing eggs.

The patterns of autoinfection highlight mother-son mating and the sex ratio. Female biased broods are favored, involving mother-son matings and accessibility to haplodiploids. Colonization is accomplished by immature stages and female bias is favored at low colonization densities by the fact that, unlike isolated males, isolated females are not lost to the gene pool because they can mate with their parthenogenetically produced sons. In the M. Adamson and D. Ludwig model, colonization was found to occur before mating and male progeny have no fitness unless they colonize a host that contains a female. The ability of a female to produce songs with which to mate is potentially central to the colonization process. This conclusion was specifically called to attention through the case of G. batrachiensis. Using, in pinworms, mother-son matings are not expected to occur commonly in this life cycle since a female's progeny must leave the host. However, in G. batrachiensis, a second mode of reproduction has developed that makes mother-son matings possible: the method by which females produce two types of eggs, thin and thick shelled, as explored in detail in the earlier sections of this article. Once again, thin-shelled eggs contain well developed larvae that hatch at deposition and develop in the same host as the mother; thick shelled eggs are deposited in the two to four stage of cleavage and must pass to the external environment before they are infective. The colonizing period in G. batrachiensis lasts about three months. During a three-year study, the number of adult worms in hosts in late fall varied between 3 and 12. If colonization is assumed to be a random process, then the mean interval between colonizations varied between 9 and 35 days with a mean of 17, which corresponds to the period a female requires to reach reproductive age. Hence, early colonists may often reach reproductive maturity in isolation from others of the opposite sex even though, by the end of the colonization period, hosts typically contain a dozen worms. Males mature about twice as fast as females, and this lessens the delay in reproduction associated with mating with a son. Brood sex ratio is skewed in G. batrachiensis. In a sample of 234 females, 205 of 296 embryos in thick-shelled eggs were diploid and would develop as females.

== Hosts ==
Gyrinicola batrachiensis is a nematode that is a parasite of the gastrointestinal tract of herbivorous anuran species, specifically in posterior end of the small intestine and in the large intestine of the tadpole stage. It is not seen in late-stage, metamorphosing tadpoles or in adult, carnivorous frogs. It is known to occur in 8 anuran species: Bufo americanus, Hyla versicolar, Pseudacris triserata, Rana aura, R. catesbeina, R. clamitans, R. pipiens, and R. sylvatica. These hosts have been found in Eastern Canadian provinces, as well as California, Ohio, and Michigan in the United States. G. batrachiensis is of special, also, in that it is quite rare for Oxyurida to be found in aquatic hosts, so rare that only 3 such species exist. This is so because monoxeny is not a successful way of life in aquatic hosts.

Recent studies have shown that G. batrachiensis has a significant effect on the developmental rates of their tadpole hosts. They have actually been found to accelerate the development and metamorphosis. The study by Pryor and Bjorndal (2005) found that the mean time to metamorphosis was 16 days shorter and that the range of times taken to reach metamorphosis was significantly narrower in tadpoles infected with these nematodes than the time taken in uninfected tadpoles. Some of the proposed manners by which this phenomenon may be explained are:

- An increase in the colonic width resulting from infection may allow for increased food intake, as well as longer retention of digested material in the fermentation region. Both of these could independently result in a higher energy gain, which could be directed towards the host's development.
- Altered fermentation due to infection results in higher rates of fermentation, providing higher energetic contributions to the host. Additionally, an increased production of propionate, relative to acetate, is also energetically advantageous to the tadpole host, again allowing the host to focus this additional energy towards development.

However, at the time of metamorphosis, infected bullfrogs had the same body size and appearance as uninfected bullfrogs, suggesting that the parasite has little impact on the physical morphology of its host (other than the shortening of development time).

== Interesting facts ==
- Gyrinicola batrachiensis is may actual represent 4 different species, differing only in their geographic distribution: G. batrachiensis in North America, G. chabaudi in South America, G. tba in Europe, and G. japonica in Japan.
