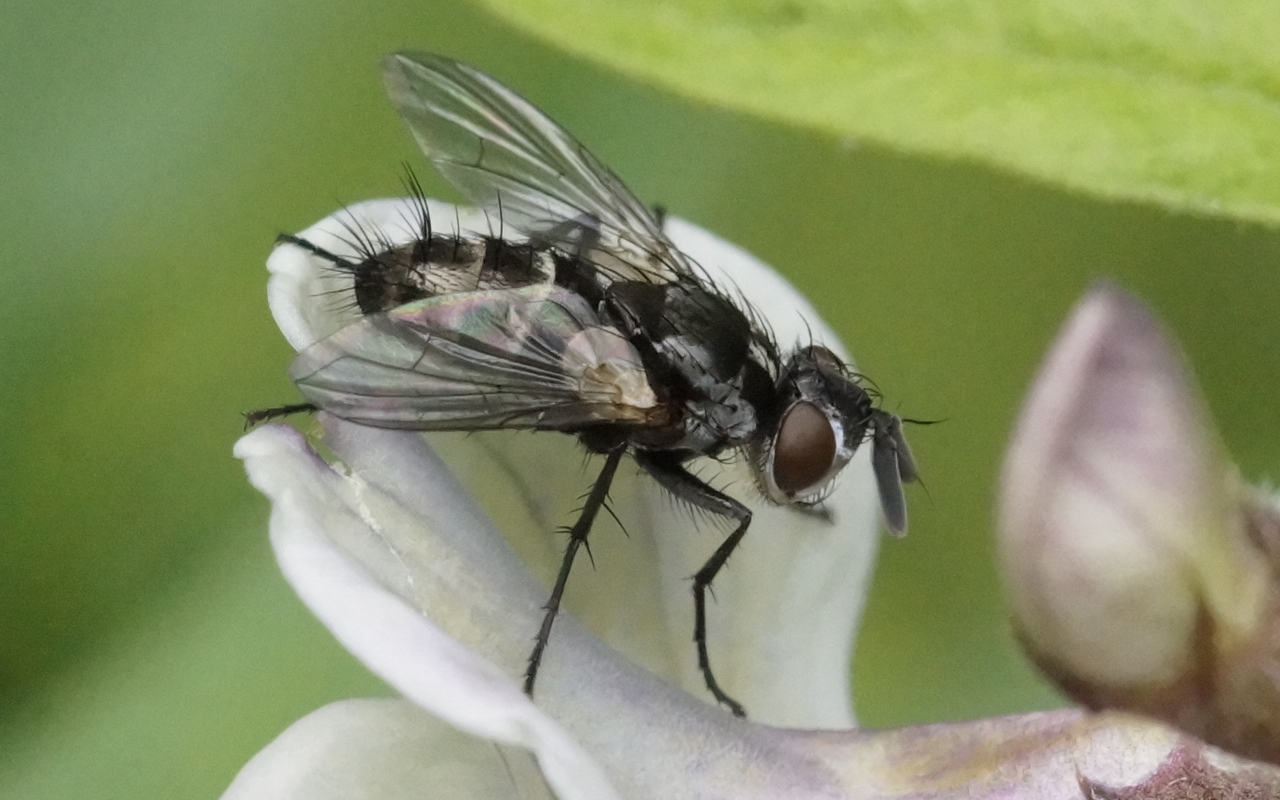
- Admontia blanda

Scientific classification
- Kingdom: Animalia
- Phylum: Arthropoda
- Clade: Pancrustacea
- Class: Insecta
- Order: Diptera
- Family: Tachinidae
- Subfamily: Exoristinae
- Tribe: Blondeliini
- Genus: Admontia; Brauer & von Bergenstamm, 1889

Type species
- Admontia podomyia Brauer & von Bergenstamm, 1889

Synonyms
- Admontiopsis Townsend, 1915; Austrostaurochaeta Townsend, 1931; Euadmontia Townsend, 1915; Euhyperecteina Townsend, 1915; Gravenhorstia Robineau-Desvoidy, 1863; Iconomedina Townsend, 1916; Poliops Aldrich, 1934; Trichopareia Brauer & von Berganstamm, 1889; Trichoparia Bezzi & Stein, 1907; Xenadmontia Townsend, 1915

= Admontia =

Genus of flies

Admontia is a genus of flies in the tribe Blondeliini and the family Tachinidae. There are 38 species in total (found in North America and Europe), 12 found in the United States and Canada.

Larvae are parasitoids of crane fly larvae. One species, Admontia degeerioides, parasitizes two species of moth larvae.

== Species ==
- Admontia antarctica (Thomson, 1869)
- Admontia aurata (Campos, 1953)
- Admontia badiceps Reinhard, 1958
- Admontia blanda (Fallén, 1820)
- Admontia calyptrata (Aldrich, 1934)
- Admontia cepelaki (Mesnil, 1961)
- Admontia communis Aldrich, 1934
- Admontia continuans Strobl, 1910
- Admontia debilis Aldrich, 1934
- Admontia degeerioides (Coquillett, 1895)
- Admontia delicatula (Mesnil, 1963)
- Admontia discalis Aldrich, 1934
- Admontia ducalis Reinhard, 1958
- Admontia duospinosa (West, 1925)
- Admontia finisterrae Cortés, 1986
- Admontia flavibasis Aldrich, 1934
- Admontia gracilipes (Mesnil, 1953)
- Admontia longicornalis O'Hara, Shima & Zhang, 2009
- Admontia longicornis Yang & Chao, 1990
- Admontia maculisquama (Zetterstedt, 1859)
- Admontia malayana (Townsend, 1926)
- Admontia nasoni Coquillett, 1895
- Admontia nigrita Thompson, 1968
- Admontia occidentalis Wulp, 1892
- Admontia offella Reinhard, 1962
- Admontia pergandei Coquillett, 1895
- Admontia pictiventris Aldrich, 1934
- Admontia podomyia Brauer & von Berganstamm, 1889
- Admontia pollinosa Curran, 1927
- Admontia pyrenaica Tschorsnig & Pujade, 1997
- Admontia quwi Zhang & Tachi, 2020
- Admontia seria (Meigen, 1824)
- Admontia stackelbergi (Mesnil, 1963)
- Admontia tarsalis Coquillett, 1898
- Admontia washingtonae (Coquillett, 1895)
- Admontia zimini (Mesnil, 1963)
