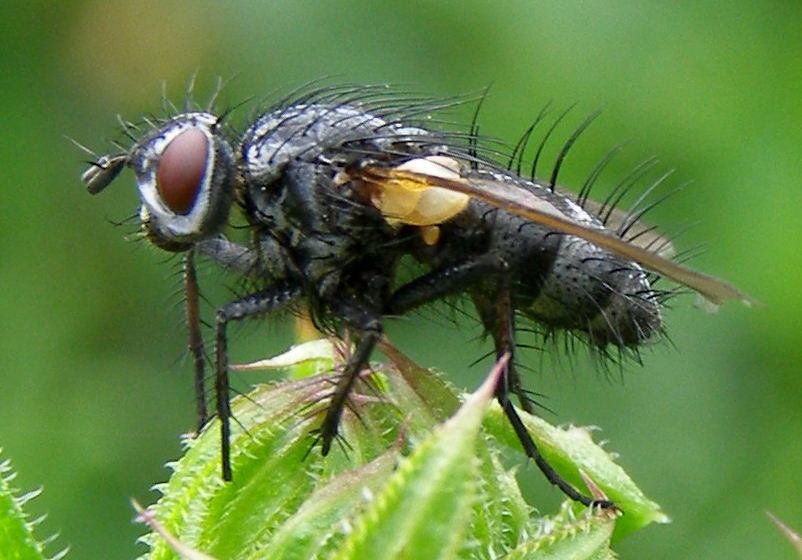

Scientific classification
- Kingdom: Animalia
- Phylum: Arthropoda
- Clade: Pancrustacea
- Class: Insecta
- Order: Diptera
- Family: Tachinidae
- Genus: Pelatachina
- Species: P. tibialis

Binomial name
- Pelatachina tibialis (Fallén, 1810)

Synonyms
- Tachina tibialis Fallén, 1810; Tachina aestiva Meigen, 1824; Tachina thyamis Walker, 1849

= Pelatachina tibialis =

Species of fly

Pelatachina tibialis is a European species of fly in the family Tachinidae.
