= Gymnomacquartia =

Scientific classification
- Kingdom: Animalia
- Phylum: Arthropoda
- Class: Insecta
- Order: Diptera
- Family: Tachinidae
- Subfamily: Tachininae
- Tribe: Macquartiini
- Genus: Gymnomacquartia; Mesnil & Shima, 1978

Type species
- Gymnomacquartia japonica Mesnil & Shima, 1978

Genus of flies

Gymnomacquartia is a genus of flies in the family Tachinidae.

== Species ==
- Gymnomacquartia japonica Mesnil & Shima, 1978

== Distribution ==
Japan.
