= Richard Henry Meade =

British justice of the peace and entomologist

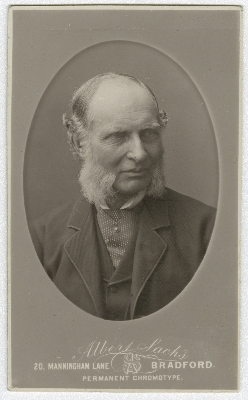
Richard Henry Meade

Richard Henry Meade (1814 – 23 December 1899 in Bradford, England) was an English surgeon, and justice of the peace, but is more noted as an entomologist who specialised in Diptera, most notably the family Muscidae, and in spiders.

== Selected works ==
- Meade, R. H., (1878) Notes on the Anthomyiidae of North America. Entomologist's Monthly Magazine, XIV 250-252
- Meade, R.H. (1882) Annotated List of British Anthomyiidae. Entomologists’ Monthly Magazine, Vol.xviii, 201-205.
- Meade, R.H. (1887) "Supplement to annotated list of British Anthomyiidae.Entomologist's Monthly Magazine 23: 179-181, 250-253, 24: 54-58, 73-76.
- Meade R.H. (1891) Additions to the list of British Anthomyiidae. Entomologist's Monthly Magazine. 1891:27(2):42–43.
