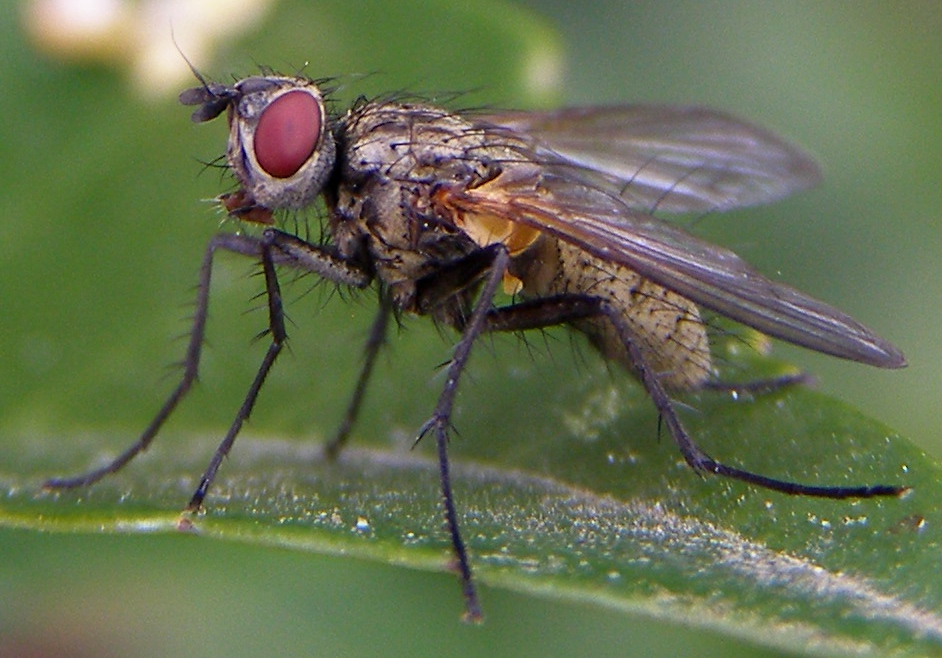
- Macquartia grisea

Scientific classification
- Kingdom: Animalia
- Phylum: Arthropoda
- Class: Insecta
- Order: Diptera
- Family: Tachinidae
- Subfamily: Tachininae
- Tribe: Macquartiini

= Macquartiini =

Tribe of flies

Macquartiini is a tribe of flies in the family Tachinidae.

== Genera ==
- Anthomyiopsis Townsend, 1916
- Chyuluella Van Emden, 1960
- Dicarca Richter, 1993
- Gonatorrhina Röder, 1886
- Gymnomacquartia Mesnil & Shima, 1978
- Lafuentemyia Marnef, 1965
- Macquartia Robineau-Desvoidy, 1830
- Macroprosopa Brauer & von Bergenstamm, 1889
- Porphyromus Van Emden, 1960
- Pseudebenia Shima, Han & Tachi, 2010
