= Pardosa pseudostrigillata =

Scientific classification
- Kingdom: Animalia
- Phylum: Arthropoda
- Subphylum: Chelicerata
- Class: Arachnida
- Order: Araneae
- Infraorder: Araneomorphae
- Family: Lycosidae
- Genus: Pardosa
- Species: P. pseudostrigillata

Binomial name
- Pardosa pseudostrigillata Tongiorgi, 1966

Species of spider

Pardosa pseudostrigillata is a species of wolf spider in the genus Pardosa that is found in the Apennine Mountains and the southern slopes of the Alps. It is related to Pardosa atomaria and Pardosa morosa. The spider has a dark carapace, or upper hard shell of the cephalothorax. and dark topside to its opisthosoma, the latter marked with a series of light markings. The pattern on its opisthosoma is deeper than on other members of the genus. Its legs have light stripes on them. Its copulatory organs are distinctive, particularly the shape of the tegulum apophysis on the male and the existence of a dark protrusion that projects from the female epigyne.

== Taxonomy ==
Pardosa pseudostrigillata is species of a wolf spider, a member of the family Lycosidae, that was first described by the arachnologist Paolo Tongiorgi in 1966. He allocated it to the genus Pardosa. The specimen he described had been previously variously allocated to the species Lycosa subitu and Lycosa maculata. It is similar to the related Pardosa atomaria and Pardosa morosa. The genus is one of the Pardosini genera alongside Acantholycosa, Mongolicosa, Sibirocosa, and Pyrenecosa.

== Description ==
The spider has a dark brown carapace, the upperside of the cephalothorax, and a dark opisthosoma with a series of light markings in between running across the opisthosoma from one side to the other. Its legs are dark with light stripes. The opisthosoma has a deeper pattern than related spiders. The male can be distinguished from other members of the genus by its copulatory organs, particularly the shape of the projection, or apophysis, that projects from the male's palpal tegulum. The female has a distinctive epigyne, the external and most visible of its copulatory organs. There is a dark protrusion that projects from the epigynal pocket. Its copulatory openings lead to relatively large and more centrally-positioned receptacles, or spermathecae.

== Distribution ==
Pardosa pseudostrigillata is endemic to the Apennine Mountains and the southern slopes of the Alps. The species has been observed in Austria, Italy and Slovenia..The male holotype was discovered in the Appennino Tosco-Emiliano National Park in Italy. It was subsequently found in Emilia-Romagna, Lombardy, and Tuscany. It has been seen in Austria, living near Imst at an altitude of 850 m (2,790 ft) above sea level. The first example to be found in Slovenia was discovered in 1968.

== Bibliography ==
- Buchar, J.; Thaler, K (2002). "Über Pardosa atomaria (C.L. Koch) und andere Pardosa-Arten an Geröllufern in Süd- und Mitteleuropa (Araneae, Lycosidae)" [On Pardosa atomaria (C.L. Koch) and other Pardosa species on scree banks in Southern and Central Europe (Araneae, Lycosidae)]. Linzer Biologische Beiträge (in German). 34: 445–465.
- Marusik, Y. M.; Azarkina, G. N.; Koponen, S. (2003). "A survey of east Palearctic Lycosidae (Aranei). II. Genus Acantholycosa F. Dahl, 1908 and related new genera". Arthropoda Selecta. 12 (2): 101–148.
- Tongiorgi, P (1966). "Italian wolf spiders of the genus Pardosa (Araneae: Lycosidae)". Bulletin of the Museum of Comparative Zoology. 134 (8): 275–334.
