= P. spinosa =

P. spinosa may refer to:

- Paa spinosa, a frog species
- Pallenis spinosa, a flowering plant species in the genus Pallenis
- Panlongia spinosa, an extinct Cambrian arthropod species in the genus Panlongia
- Phylloxylon spinosa, a legume species
- Pochyta spinosa, a jumping spider species in the genus Pochyta
- Prostanthera spinosa, a mintbush species in the genus Prostanthera
- Protosagitta spinosa, a predatory marine worm species in the genus Protosagitta
- Prunus spinosa, a deciduous large shrub species
- Pseudomonas spinosa, a Gram-negative soil bacterium species
- Pteroneta spinosa, a sac spider species in the genus Pteroneta
- Pultenaea spinosa, a flowering plant species in the genus Pultenaea
- Pyrenecosa spinosa, a wolf spider species in the genus Pyrenecosa

== Synonyms ==
- Poinciana spinosa, a synonym for Caesalpinia spinosa, the tara, a tree species native to Peru

== See also ==
- Spinosa (disambiguation)
