= Pardosa drenskii =

Scientific classification
- Kingdom: Animalia
- Phylum: Arthropoda
- Subphylum: Chelicerata
- Class: Arachnida
- Order: Araneae
- Infraorder: Araneomorphae
- Family: Lycosidae
- Genus: Pardosa
- Species: P. drenskii

Binomial name
- Pardosa drenskii Buchar, 1968

Species of wolf spider

Pardosa drenskii is a species of wolf spider in the genus Pardosa that is Bulgaria, Greece and North Macedonia. It lives in meadows on mountains at an altitude of between 2,252 m (7,388 ft) above sea level. The spider measures typically between 4.7 and 5.4 mm (0.19 and 0.21 in) in total length, the female being larger than the male, although its cephalothorax is generally similar in length, between 2.2 and 3.1 mm (0.087 and 0.122 in) long. It is generally brownish-yellow or brown on top, the male being darker, with a stripe on its abdomen that is yellow on the female and brown on the male. Its sternum is brown, the female being marked with a lighter ovoid patch in the middle. Its legs are yellow. Its copulatory organs, are similar to the related Pardosa saltuaria, differing in the structure of the female's epigyne and the male's hairy tegular apophysis.

== Taxonomy ==
Pardosa drenskii is a species of a wolf spider, a member of the family Lycosidae, that was first described by the arachnologist Buchar, 1968. He allocated it to the genus Pardosa, which had been circumscribed by Carl Ludwig Koch in 1847. It is closely related to Pardosa saltuaria. The genus is one of the Pardosini genera alongside Acantholycosa, Mongolicosa, Sibirocosa, and Pyrenecosa. The spider is named after the Bulgarian arachnologist P. Drenski.

== Description ==
Pardosa spiders are small to medium in size. The female Pardosa drenskii has a typical total length of 5.4 mm (0.21 in). It has a light brownish-yellow cephalothorax that is between 2.2 and 3 mm (0.087 and 0.118 in). The carapace, or topside of the cephalothorax, has a pattern of dark bands that stretch from front to back and narrow brown stripes on its edges. Its sternum, or underside of the cephalothorax, is brown with an ovoid lighter patch in the middle. Its face, including its clypeus, is brownish-yellow, as are its mouthparts, including its chelicerae, which has three teeth at the front and other three at the back, although its labium is brown. The top of its abdomen is also brown and has a yellow stripe in the middle. The underside of its abdomen is yellow with darker edges. It has mainly yellow spinnerets, although parts of the lower ones are brown. Its legs are also yellow.

The male is smaller and has a typical total length of 4.7 mm (0.19 in). Its cephalothorax is similar in size, between 2.2 and 3.1 mm (0.12 in), and darker on top and uniform brown underneath. The stripe in the middle of the spider's abdomen is also brown and there are black dots visible on the topside. Its spinnerets are also darker, the upper ones being brown and the lower ones black, and surrounded by yellow spots. It is otherwise similar to the female.

The male has a relatively large cymbium that almost completely encases the palpal bulb. The female's epigyne, the external and most visible of its copulatory organs, is similar to the related Pardosa saltuaria, although it differs in the way that the extensions at the back form a characteristic wavy pattern. The male has a apophysis, or spike, that comes out of the tegulum and extends beyond the palpal bulb. It is longer and hairier than that on both Pardosa saltuaria and Pardosa hyperborea. Many of the male spiders found have a 'claw' on their cymbium.

== Distribution and habitat ==
Pardosa drenskii is endemic to the Balkans. The holotype was found in Bulgaria. It has been subsequently found in Greece and North Macedonia, including specimen collected at an altitude of between 2,028 and 2,252 m (6,654 and 7,388 ft) above sea level on mountains like Ruen. The spider lives in meadows of mesophyte plants in subalpine areas. Unlike some other members of the genus, it does not live in forested areas.
