= Pyrenecosa spinosa =

Scientific classification
- Kingdom: Animalia
- Phylum: Arthropoda
- Subphylum: Chelicerata
- Class: Arachnida
- Order: Araneae
- Infraorder: Araneomorphae
- Family: Lycosidae
- Genus: Pyrenecosa
- Species: P. spinosa

Binomial name
- Pyrenecosa spinosa (Denis, 1938)

Species of spider

Pyrenecosa spinosa is a species of wolf spider found in Andorra. The spider measures between 7 and 9 mm (0.28 and 0.35 in) in length. It has a brown carapace, or upper hard shell of the cephalothorax. and grey-black topside to its opisthosoma. The underside is lighter, particularly the sternum, the underside of the cephalothorax, which is light brown. Its legs are brown and yellow-brown. Its copulatory organs are distinctive, particularly the corners of the most visible female copulatory organ. The male has a ribbon-like embolus.

== Taxonomy ==
Pyrenecosa spinosa is species of a wolf spider, a member of the family Lycosidae, that was first described by the arachnologist Jacques Denis in 1938. He originally allocated it to the genus Pardosa but he moved it to Acantholycosa slightly more than ten years later. According to Jan Bucher and Konrad Thaler, it is related to Acantholycosa pedestris. In 2003, Yuri Marusik, Galina Azarkina and Seppo Koponen moved the species to the new Pyrenecosa. The genus is one of the Pardosini genera alongside Acantholycosa, Mongolicosa, Sibirocosa, and Pardosa.

== Description ==
The spider measures typically between 7 and 9 mm (0.28 and 0.35 in) long. It has a dark brown carapace, the upperside of the cephalothorax, and light brown sternum, underneath. Its opisthosoma is grey-black on top and lighter on the bottom. Its legs are brown on top and yellowish-brown underneath. The female has an epigyne, the external and most visible of its copulatory organs, that has distinctive corners and a very narrow groove in the middle. The male has a ribbon-like embolus that projects from the palpal bulb and a claw-like projection near the top of the bulb called a terminal apophysis.

== Distribution ==
The species is endemic to Andorra. It has been found living at relatively low altitudes, typically 1,555 m (5,102 ft) above sea level.

== Bibliography ==
- Buchar, J.; Thaler, K (1993). "Die Arten der Gattung Acantholycosa in Westeuropa (Arachnida, Araneida: Lycosidae)" [The species of the genus Acantholycosa in Western Europe (Arachnida, Araneida: Lycosidae)]. Revue Suisse de Zoologie. 100 (2): 327–341. doi:10.5962/bhl.part.79864.
- Marusik, Y. M.; Azarkina, G. N.; Koponen, S. (2003). "A survey of east Palearctic Lycosidae (Aranei). II. Genus Acantholycosa F. Dahl, 1908 and related new genera". Arthropoda Selecta. 12 (2): 101–148.
