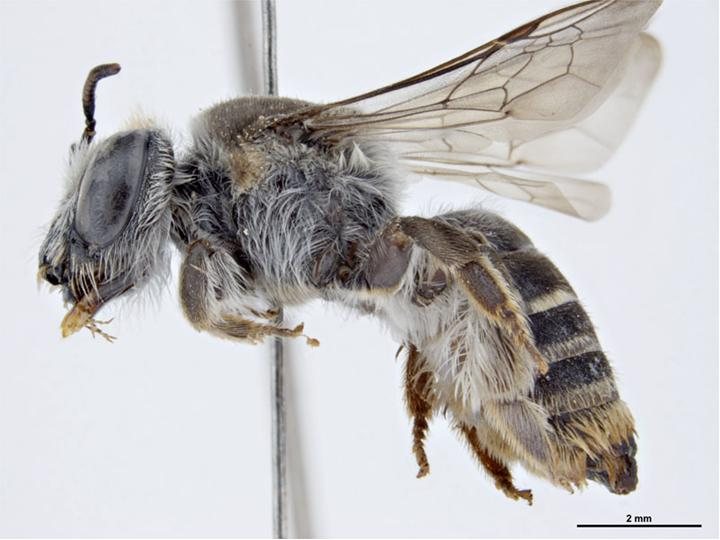
- Female

Scientific classification
- Kingdom: Animalia
- Phylum: Arthropoda
- Clade: Pancrustacea
- Class: Insecta
- Order: Hymenoptera
- Family: Colletidae
- Genus: Leioproctus
- Species: L. xanthosus

Binomial name
- Leioproctus xanthosus Maynard 1993

= Leioproctus xanthosus =

Species of bee

Leioproctus xanthosus, or Leioproctus (Ceratocolletes) xanthosus, is a species of bee in the family Colletidae and subfamily Colletinae. It is endemic to Australia. It was described by Australian entomologist Glynn Maynard in 1993.

== Etymology ==
The specific epithet xanthosus (Greek: "yellow") is an anatomical reference to the facial hair of the males.

== Description ==
Female body length is about 12.5 mm, male body length 10 mm. Integumental colouration is mainly black; the hair is white, golden and brown.

== Distribution and habitat ==
The species occurs in eastern Australia. The type locality is 2 km west of Mount Cotton, Queensland.

== Behaviour ==
The adults are flying mellivores. Flowering plants visited by the bees include Pultenaea euchila and Pultenaea spinosa.

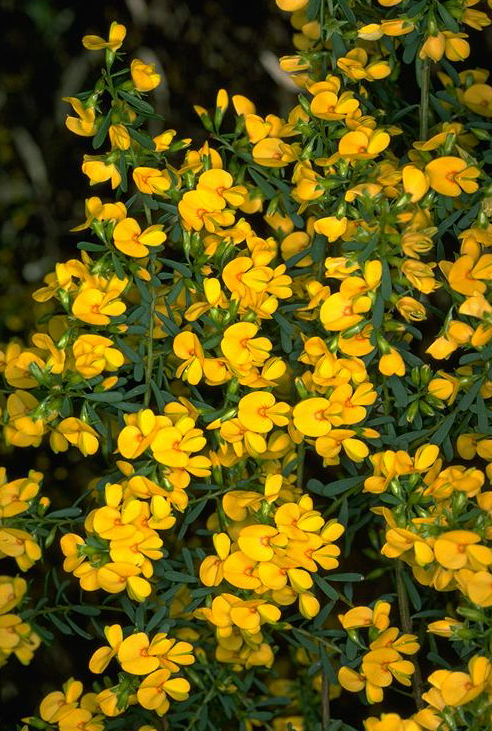
Flowers of Pultenaea euchila (orange pultenaea), a forage plant of the bees

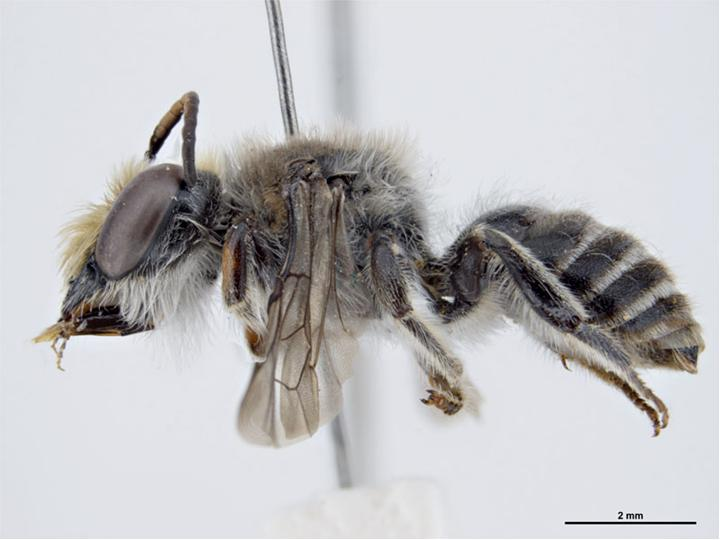
Male
