= Prostanthera sejuncta =

Scientific classification
- Kingdom: Plantae
- Clade: Tracheophytes
- Clade: Angiosperms
- Clade: Eudicots
- Clade: Asterids
- Order: Lamiales
- Family: Lamiaceae
- Genus: Prostanthera
- Species: P. sejuncta

Binomial name
- Prostanthera sejuncta M.L.Williams, Drinnan & N.G.Walsh
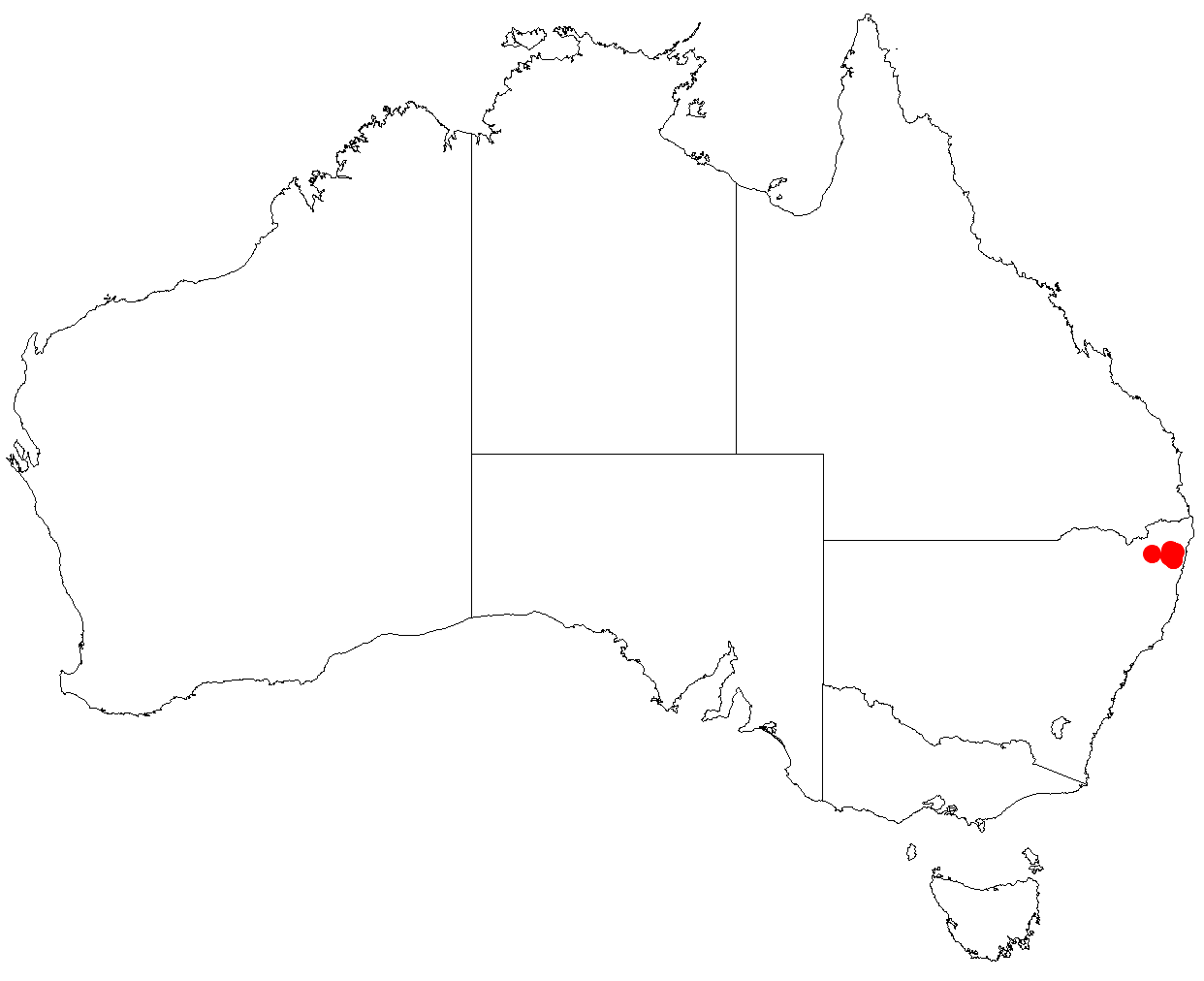
- Occurrence data from AVH

Synonyms
- Prostanthera sejuncta M.L.Williams, Drinnan & N.G.Walsh subsp. sejuncta; Prostanthera spinosa subsp. subspinescens M.L.Williams, Drinnan & N.G.Walsh; Prostanthera spinosa auct. non F.Muell.: Conn, B.J. in Harden, G.J. (ed.) (1992), Lamiaceae. Flora of New South Wales

Species of flowering plant

Prostanthera sejuncta is a flowering plant in the family Lamiaceae and is endemic to a small area of New South Wales. It is a scrambling, more or less prostrate, aromatic shrub with spiny branches, narrow egg-shaped leaves and pale mauve, pale lilac or almost white flowers.

== Description ==
Prostanthera sejuncta is a scrambling, more or less prostrate, aromatic shrub that typically grows to a height of 50 cm (20 in) with branches that have spines up to 16 mm (0.63 in) long arranged in opposite pairs at right angles to each other. The leaves are light to dark green, paler on the lower surface, narrow egg-shaped, 1.5–6 mm (0.059–0.236 in) long and 1–4 mm (0.039–0.157 in) wide on a petiole 0.4–1 mm (0.016–0.039 in) long. There are more or less sessile glands on the lower surface of the leaves. The flowers are arranged in leaf axils with bracteoles 0.9–2.5 mm (0.035–0.098 in) long at the base. The sepals are 3.5–6.5 mm (0.14–0.26 in) long, joined at the base forming a tube 2–3 mm (0.079–0.118 in) long with two lobes, the upper lobe 1.5–3 mm (0.059–0.118 in) long. The petals are 8–14 mm (0.31–0.55 in) long and pale mauve, pale lilac or almost white.

== Taxonomy ==
Prostanthera sejuncta was first formally described in 2006 by Mark Williams, Andrew Drinnan and Neville Walsh in the journal Australian Systematic Botany from specimens collected on Mount Arapiles. Specimens of this plant were previously included with P. spinosa, now considered to be endemic to Victoria.

== Distribution and habitat ==
This mintbush grows in sandstone soils often along main creeklines near Copmanhurst in north-eastern New South Wales.

== Conservation status ==
Prostanthera sejuncta is abundant in Fortis Creek National Park, Banyabba Nature reserve and also occurs in travelling stock reserves and on freehold land at the Pinnacles Estate. It is listed as "vulnerable" under the New South Wales Government Biodiversity Conservation Act 2016. The threats to the species include vegetation clearance, road and track maintenance, inappropriate fire regimes and the species' restricted distribution.
