= A. norvegica =

A. norvegica may refer to:

- Acantholycosa norvegica, a wolf spider species
- Arenaria norvegica, the Norwegian sandwort, a plant species
- Artemisia norvegica, the alpine sagewort, a flowering plant species
