= Mongolicosa songi =

Scientific classification
- Kingdom: Animalia
- Phylum: Arthropoda
- Subphylum: Chelicerata
- Class: Arachnida
- Order: Araneae
- Infraorder: Araneomorphae
- Family: Lycosidae
- Genus: Mongolicosa
- Species: M. songi

Binomial name
- Mongolicosa songi Marusik, Azarkina & Koponen, 2003

Species of spider

Mongolicosa songi is a species of wolf spider found in Xinjiang, China and adjacent areas of Mongolia.

This is a dirty-brown coloured spider up to 7.4 mm in length with few distinguishing markings apart from a faint heart-shaped mark on the abdomen. Its closest known relative is M. gobiensis, from which it can be distinguished only by details of the genitalia.
