= Acantholycosa sundukovi =

Scientific classification
- Kingdom: Animalia
- Phylum: Arthropoda
- Subphylum: Chelicerata
- Class: Arachnida
- Order: Araneae
- Infraorder: Araneomorphae
- Family: Lycosidae
- Genus: Acantholycosa
- Species: A. sundukovi

Binomial name
- Acantholycosa sundukovi Marusik, Azarkina & Koponen, 2003

Species of spider

Acantholycosa sundukovi is a species of wolf spiders only known from Primorsky Krai, Russia.

This species was described from a single rather poorly preserved male specimen from which little external detail could be distinguished. From study of the genitalia, this species is clearly most closely related to Acantholycosa oligerae but clearly differs from that species by its smaller size (6 mm in length).
