= Acantholycosa plumalis =

Scientific classification
- Kingdom: Animalia
- Phylum: Arthropoda
- Subphylum: Chelicerata
- Class: Arachnida
- Order: Araneae
- Infraorder: Araneomorphae
- Family: Lycosidae
- Genus: Acantholycosa
- Species: A. plumalis

Binomial name
- Acantholycosa plumalis Marusik, Azarkina & Koponen, 2003

Species of spider

Acantholycosa plumalis is a species of wolf spider only known from the vicinity of Lake Teletskoye in the Russian part of the Altai Mountains.

This is one of the largest spiders in the genus at up to 10.8 mm in length. It can be separated from most other Acantholycosa species by the long, dense hairs covering the abdomen and legs. It can be separated from the only similarly hairy species, Acantholycosa paraplumalis by details of the genitalia.
