= Acantholycosa dudkorum =

Scientific classification
- Kingdom: Animalia
- Phylum: Arthropoda
- Subphylum: Chelicerata
- Class: Arachnida
- Order: Araneae
- Infraorder: Araneomorphae
- Family: Lycosidae
- Genus: Acantholycosa
- Species: A. dudkorum

Binomial name
- Acantholycosa dudkorum Marusik, Azarkina & Koponen, 2003

Species of spider

Acantholycosa dudkorum is a species of wolf spider only known from the south-central Altai Mountains in Russia.

This spider is up to 9.8 mm in length. It is dark brown with a black head and yellow-brown spots on the upper legs. It is very similar to Acantholycosa dudkoromani and they may be conspecific.
