= Acantholycosa sterneri =

Scientific classification
- Kingdom: Animalia
- Phylum: Arthropoda
- Subphylum: Chelicerata
- Class: Arachnida
- Order: Araneae
- Infraorder: Araneomorphae
- Family: Lycosidae
- Genus: Acantholycosa
- Species: A. sterneri

Binomial name
- Acantholycosa sterneri Marusik, 1993

Species of spider

Acantholycosa sterneri is a species of wolf spider found in Mongolia and southern Siberia.

The male of this spider is easily distinguished from congeners by its densely hairy first and second pair of legs.
