= Sibirocosa subsolana =

Scientific classification
- Kingdom: Animalia
- Phylum: Arthropoda
- Subphylum: Chelicerata
- Class: Arachnida
- Order: Araneae
- Infraorder: Araneomorphae
- Family: Lycosidae
- Genus: Sibirocosa
- Species: S. subsolana

Binomial name
- Sibirocosa subsolana Kulczyński, 1907

Species of spider

Sibirocosa subsolana is a species of wolf spider. This is a spider of the extreme north-east of Asia, only found east of the Kolyma River to the edge of the Chukchi Peninsula. It is also found on Wrangel Island and may also occur on the Seward Peninsula at the western extremity of Alaska.

This spider has a body length of up to 7 mm and varies in colour from brown to almost black. The carapace is patterned in the female but plain and unmarked in the male. Both sexes have a reddish-brown heart-shaped mark and rows of white spots on the abdomen. It can only be distinguished with certainty from related species by details of the genitalia.
