= Acantholycosa katunensis =

- Female (left) and male (right). Scale: 2 mm

Scientific classification
- Kingdom: Animalia
- Phylum: Arthropoda
- Subphylum: Chelicerata
- Class: Arachnida
- Order: Araneae
- Infraorder: Araneomorphae
- Family: Lycosidae
- Genus: Acantholycosa
- Species: A. katunensis

Binomial name
- Acantholycosa katunensis Marusik, Azarkina & Koponen, 2004

Synonyms
- Acantholycosa kurchumensis Marusik, Azarkina & Koponen, 2004

Species of spider

Acantholycosa katunensis is a species of wolf spider. It is known from eastern Kazakhstan to the Altai region in Russia.

== Taxonomy ==
At the time of their description, Acantholycosa katunensis was only known from the holotype male, whereas A. kurchumensis was only known from females. Later research showed these to be the same species.

== Description ==
The holotype of A. katunensis, a male, measures 8.5 mm (0.33 in) in total length. The type series of A. kurchumensis, all females, measure 7.5–7.8 mm (0.30–0.31 in) in total length. Colouration is brown to dark brown. Body and legs are covered in long hairs.
