= Acantholycosa mordkovitchi =

Scientific classification
- Kingdom: Animalia
- Phylum: Arthropoda
- Subphylum: Chelicerata
- Class: Arachnida
- Order: Araneae
- Infraorder: Araneomorphae
- Family: Lycosidae
- Genus: Acantholycosa
- Species: A. mordkovitchi

Binomial name
- Acantholycosa mordkovitchi Marusik, Azarkina & Koponen, 2003

Species of spider

Acantholycosa mordkovitchi is a species of wolf spider only known from the Terektinsky Mountain Range in the Russian part of the Altai Mountains.

This is a grey-brown spider up to 9.5 mm in length. The female is darker than the male. The male palps are distinctively marked, the yellowish femur and tibia contrasting with the almost black terminal cymbium.
