= Acantholycosa altaiensis =

Scientific classification
- Kingdom: Animalia
- Phylum: Arthropoda
- Subphylum: Chelicerata
- Class: Arachnida
- Order: Araneae
- Infraorder: Araneomorphae
- Family: Lycosidae
- Genus: Acantholycosa
- Species: A. altaiensis

Binomial name
- Acantholycosa altaiensis Marusik, Azarkina & Koponen, 2003

Species of spider

Acantholycosa altaiensis is a species of wolf spider only known from the Tigiretsky Mountain Range in the Russian part of the Altai Mountains.

This uniformly dark brown spider is up to 9 mm in length. It can only be separated from its closest congeners by details of the genitalia.
