= Sibirocosa kolymensis =

Scientific classification
- Kingdom: Animalia
- Phylum: Arthropoda
- Subphylum: Chelicerata
- Class: Arachnida
- Order: Araneae
- Infraorder: Araneomorphae
- Family: Lycosidae
- Genus: Sibirocosa
- Species: S. kolymensis

Binomial name
- Sibirocosa kolymensis Marusik, Azarkina & Koponen, 2003

Species of spider

Sibirocosa kolymensis is a species of wolf spider found in the Kolyma region in the far east of Russia.

This species has a body length of up to 7 mm (0.28 in). It is rather variable in colour, from brown to almost black. There are few external distinguishing marks (apart from a reddish heart-shaped mark on the abdomen of the male) and it can only be distinguished with certainty from related species by details of the genitalia.
