= Acantholycosa levinae =

Scientific classification
- Kingdom: Animalia
- Phylum: Arthropoda
- Subphylum: Chelicerata
- Class: Arachnida
- Order: Araneae
- Infraorder: Araneomorphae
- Family: Lycosidae
- Genus: Acantholycosa
- Species: A. levinae

Binomial name
- Acantholycosa levinae Marusik, Azarkina & Koponen, 2003

Species of spider

Acantholycosa levinae is a species of wolf spider only known to inhabit the Katunski Mountain Range in the Russian part of the Altai Mountains.

This dark-coloured, long-legged spider is about 7.5 mm in length. The abdomen has lighter markings: a heart-shaped mark and two rows of spots.
