= Mongolicosa mongolensis =

Scientific classification
- Kingdom: Animalia
- Phylum: Arthropoda
- Subphylum: Chelicerata
- Class: Arachnida
- Order: Araneae
- Infraorder: Araneomorphae
- Family: Lycosidae
- Genus: Mongolicosa
- Species: M. mongolensis

Binomial name
- Mongolicosa mongolensis Marusik, Azarkina & Koponen, 2003

Species of spider

Mongolicosa mongolensis is a species of wolf spider only known from Gurvanbulag district, Bayankhongor Province, Mongolia.

This spider, up to 8 mm in length, is dark brown in colour. There are pale bands on the carapace and a reddish heart-shaped mark on the abdomen although all body markings are poorly defined. The legs, however show clear pale banding.
