= Acantholycosa logunovi =

Scientific classification
- Kingdom: Animalia
- Phylum: Arthropoda
- Subphylum: Chelicerata
- Class: Arachnida
- Order: Araneae
- Infraorder: Araneomorphae
- Family: Lycosidae
- Genus: Acantholycosa
- Species: A. logunovi

Binomial name
- Acantholycosa logunovi Marusik, Azarkina & Koponen, 2003

Species of spider

Acantholycosa logunovi is a species of wolf spider only known from the Altai Mountains in Russia.

This species has a body length of up to 9.5 mm. The male is dark brown and covered with whitish hairs. The female is brown with a pale stripe down the middle of the carapace and a pattern of pale rings and spots on the legs.
