= Sibirocosa manchurica =

Scientific classification
- Kingdom: Animalia
- Phylum: Arthropoda
- Subphylum: Chelicerata
- Class: Arachnida
- Order: Araneae
- Infraorder: Araneomorphae
- Family: Lycosidae
- Genus: Sibirocosa
- Species: S. manchurica

Binomial name
- Sibirocosa manchurica Marusik, Azarkina & Koponen, 2003

Species of spider

Sibirocosa manchurica is a species of wolf spiders only known from Primorsky Krai, Russia.

This spider, with a body length of up to 7.25 mm, is dark brown, sometimes almost black. The abdomen of the male is marked with a reddish heart-shaped mark and two rows of white spots. The abdomen of the female just has 4 pairs of white spots.
