= Pyrenecosa pyrenaea =

Scientific classification
- Kingdom: Animalia
- Phylum: Arthropoda
- Subphylum: Chelicerata
- Class: Arachnida
- Order: Araneae
- Infraorder: Araneomorphae
- Family: Lycosidae
- Genus: Pyrenecosa
- Species: P. pyrenaea

Binomial name
- Pyrenecosa pyrenaea (Simon, 1876)

Species of spider

Pyrenecosa pyrenaea is a wolf spider species found in the Pyrenees.
