= Mongolicosa glupovi =

Scientific classification
- Kingdom: Animalia
- Phylum: Arthropoda
- Subphylum: Chelicerata
- Class: Arachnida
- Order: Araneae
- Infraorder: Araneomorphae
- Family: Lycosidae
- Genus: Mongolicosa
- Species: M. glupovi

Binomial name
- Mongolicosa glupovi Marusik, Azarkina & Koponen, 2003

Species of spider

Mongolicosa glupovi is a species of wolf spider found in the Russian republics of Altai, Khakassia and Tuva.

This is a dark-coloured spider up to 9.2 mm in length. The male is darker than the female, with the tibia and tarsus paler than the rest of the leg. In females it is the coxa and patella which are slightly paler. (See arthropod leg#Chelicerata for details).
