= Pyrenecosa rupicola =

Scientific classification
- Kingdom: Animalia
- Phylum: Arthropoda
- Subphylum: Chelicerata
- Class: Arachnida
- Order: Araneae
- Infraorder: Araneomorphae
- Family: Lycosidae
- Genus: Pyrenecosa
- Species: P. rupicola

Binomial name
- Pyrenecosa rupicola (Dufour, 1821)

Species of spider

Pyrenecosa rupicola is a wolf spider species found in France, Spain, Italy, and Switzerland.
