= Acantholycosa azyuzini =

Scientific classification
- Kingdom: Animalia
- Phylum: Arthropoda
- Subphylum: Chelicerata
- Class: Arachnida
- Order: Araneae
- Infraorder: Araneomorphae
- Family: Lycosidae
- Genus: Acantholycosa
- Species: A. azyuzini

Binomial name
- Acantholycosa azyuzini Marusik, Hippa & Koponen, 1996

Species of spider

Acantholycosa azyuzini is a species of wolf spider, family Lycosidae. It is only known from the Altai Mountains in Russia. It is named for Alexei A. Zyuzin.

This spider can only be separated from its closest congeners by details of the genitalia.
