= Sibirocosa sibirica =

Scientific classification
- Kingdom: Animalia
- Phylum: Arthropoda
- Subphylum: Chelicerata
- Class: Arachnida
- Order: Araneae
- Infraorder: Araneomorphae
- Family: Lycosidae
- Genus: Sibirocosa
- Species: S. sibirica

Binomial name
- Sibirocosa sibirica Kulczyński, 1908

Species of spider

Sibirocosa sibirica is a species of wolf spider. It has a fairly wide distribution in Siberia: from the Putorana Plateau east to the Chersky Range and south to northern Transbaikal.

This spider has a body length of up to 6.5 mm. It is usually brown in colour, though it is quite variable. There are few external distinguishing marks although the male has a light coloured heart-shaped mark and two rows of white spots on the abdomen. It can only be distinguished with certainty from related species by details of the genitalia.
