= Acantholycosa petrophila =

Scientific classification
- Kingdom: Animalia
- Phylum: Arthropoda
- Subphylum: Chelicerata
- Class: Arachnida
- Order: Araneae
- Infraorder: Araneomorphae
- Family: Lycosidae
- Genus: Acantholycosa
- Species: A. petrophila

Binomial name
- Acantholycosa petrophila Marusik, Azarkina & Koponen, 2003

Species of spider

Acantholycosa petrophila is a species of wolf spider only known from the western Sayan Mountains in Khakassia, Russia.

This dark grey spider, up to 8.5 mm in length, can only be separated from its closest congener, Acantholycosa khakassica by details of the genitalia.
