= Acantholycosa sayanensis =

Scientific classification
- Kingdom: Animalia
- Phylum: Arthropoda
- Subphylum: Chelicerata
- Class: Arachnida
- Order: Araneae
- Infraorder: Araneomorphae
- Family: Lycosidae
- Genus: Acantholycosa
- Species: A. sayanensis

Binomial name
- Acantholycosa sayanensis Marusik, Azarkina & Koponen, 2003

Species of spider

Acantholycosa sayanensis is a species of wolf spiders found only in the Western Sayan Mountains in Russia.

This dark coloured spider with rather indistinct markings is 8.5 mm in length. It can only be separated from its closest congeners by details of the genitalia.
