= Acantholycosa spinembolus =

Scientific classification
- Kingdom: Animalia
- Phylum: Arthropoda
- Subphylum: Chelicerata
- Class: Arachnida
- Order: Araneae
- Infraorder: Araneomorphae
- Family: Lycosidae
- Genus: Acantholycosa
- Species: A. spinembolus

Binomial name
- Acantholycosa spinembolus Marusik, Azarkina & Koponen, 2003

Species of spider

Acantholycosa spinembolus is a species of wolf spiders only known from the Kholzun Mountain Range in the Russian part of the Altai Mountains.

This is a dark-coloured spider up to 7.5 mm in length. The carapace and abdomen are plain and unmarked but the legs have distinctive pale rings. This species can only be distinguished from its closest congeners by details of the genitalia.
