= Acantholycosa zinchenkoi =

Scientific classification
- Kingdom: Animalia
- Phylum: Arthropoda
- Subphylum: Chelicerata
- Class: Arachnida
- Order: Araneae
- Infraorder: Araneomorphae
- Family: Lycosidae
- Genus: Acantholycosa
- Species: A. zinchenkoi

Binomial name
- Acantholycosa zinchenkoi Marusik, Azarkina & Koponen, 2003

Species of spider

Acantholycosa zinchenkoi is a species of wolf spiders only known from the Katun Mountain Range in the southwestern Altai Mountains of Russia and Kazakhstan.

This is a dark-coloured spider up to 10 mm in length. The upper side of the abdomen of the male is almost black with a reddish-brown heart-shaped marking. The underside of the abdomen is much paler. The female is generally similar to, but paler than, the male. The abdomen and legs are covered in long hairs, dense on the abdomen, sparser on the legs.
