= Acantholycosa paraplumalis =

Scientific classification
- Kingdom: Animalia
- Phylum: Arthropoda
- Subphylum: Chelicerata
- Class: Arachnida
- Order: Araneae
- Infraorder: Araneomorphae
- Family: Lycosidae
- Genus: Acantholycosa
- Species: A. paraplumalis

Binomial name
- Acantholycosa paraplumalis Marusik, Azarkina & Koponen, 2003

Species of spider

Acantholycosa paraplumalis is a species of wolf spider only known from the northern Altai Mountains, Russia.

This is one of the largest spiders in the genus at up to 10.8 mm in length. It can be separated from most other Acantholycosa species by the long, dense hairs covering the abdomen and legs. It can be separated from the only similarly hairy species, A. plumalis, by details of the genitalia.
