= Acantholycosa khakassica =

Scientific classification
- Kingdom: Animalia
- Phylum: Arthropoda
- Subphylum: Chelicerata
- Class: Arachnida
- Order: Araneae
- Infraorder: Araneomorphae
- Family: Lycosidae
- Genus: Acantholycosa
- Species: A. khakassica

Binomial name
- Acantholycosa khakassica Marusik, Azarkina & Koponen, 2003

Species of spider

Acantholycosa khakassica is a species of wolf spider only known from south-western Khakassia, Russia.

This brown spider, up to 9.2 mm in length, can only be separated from its closest congener, Acantholycosa petrophila by details of the genitalia.
