= Mongolicosa buryatica =

Scientific classification
- Kingdom: Animalia
- Phylum: Arthropoda
- Subphylum: Chelicerata
- Class: Arachnida
- Order: Araneae
- Infraorder: Araneomorphae
- Family: Lycosidae
- Genus: Mongolicosa
- Species: M. buryatica

Binomial name
- Mongolicosa buryatica Marusik, Azarkina & Koponen, 2003

Species of spider

Mongolicosa buryatica is a species of wolf spider only known from the eastern Sayan Mountains in Buryatia, Russia.

This spider, up to 9 mm in length, is dark brown (but paler on the ventral side of the legs) and densely covered with long hairs (these are especially dense on the abdomen). The male is darker and hairier than the female with dark red markings. The female is uniformly dark brown apart from paler coxae and patellae.
