= Mongolicosa =

Scientific classification
- Kingdom: Animalia
- Phylum: Arthropoda
- Subphylum: Chelicerata
- Class: Arachnida
- Order: Araneae
- Infraorder: Araneomorphae
- Family: Lycosidae
- Genus: Mongolicosa; Marusik, Azarkina & Koponen, 2003

Type species
- Mongolicosa glupovi Marusik, Azarkina & Koponen, 2003

Species
- See text

Genus of spiders

Mongolicosa is a genus of wolf spiders containing eight species found in central Asia from the Altai Mountains east to western Buryatia and south to Xinjiang and the Gobi Desert.

Spiders of this genus are dark coloured without any clear patterning. Body length is from 6 - 9.2 mm. The legs are relatively short compared with spiders of the related genera Acantholycosa and Sibirocosa.

== Species ==
The genus Mongolicosa contains the following species:

- Mongolicosa buryatica Marusik, Azarkina & Koponen, 2004
- Mongolicosa glupovi Marusik, Azarkina & Koponen, 2004
- Mongolicosa gobiensis Marusik, Azarkina & Koponen, 2004
- Mongolicosa mongolensis Marusik, Azarkina & Koponen, 2004
- Mongolicosa przhewalskii Fomichev & Marusik, 2017
- Mongolicosa pseudoferruginea (Schenkel, 1936)
- Mongolicosa songi Marusik, Azarkina & Koponen, 2004
- Mongolicosa uncia Fomichev & Marusik, 2017
