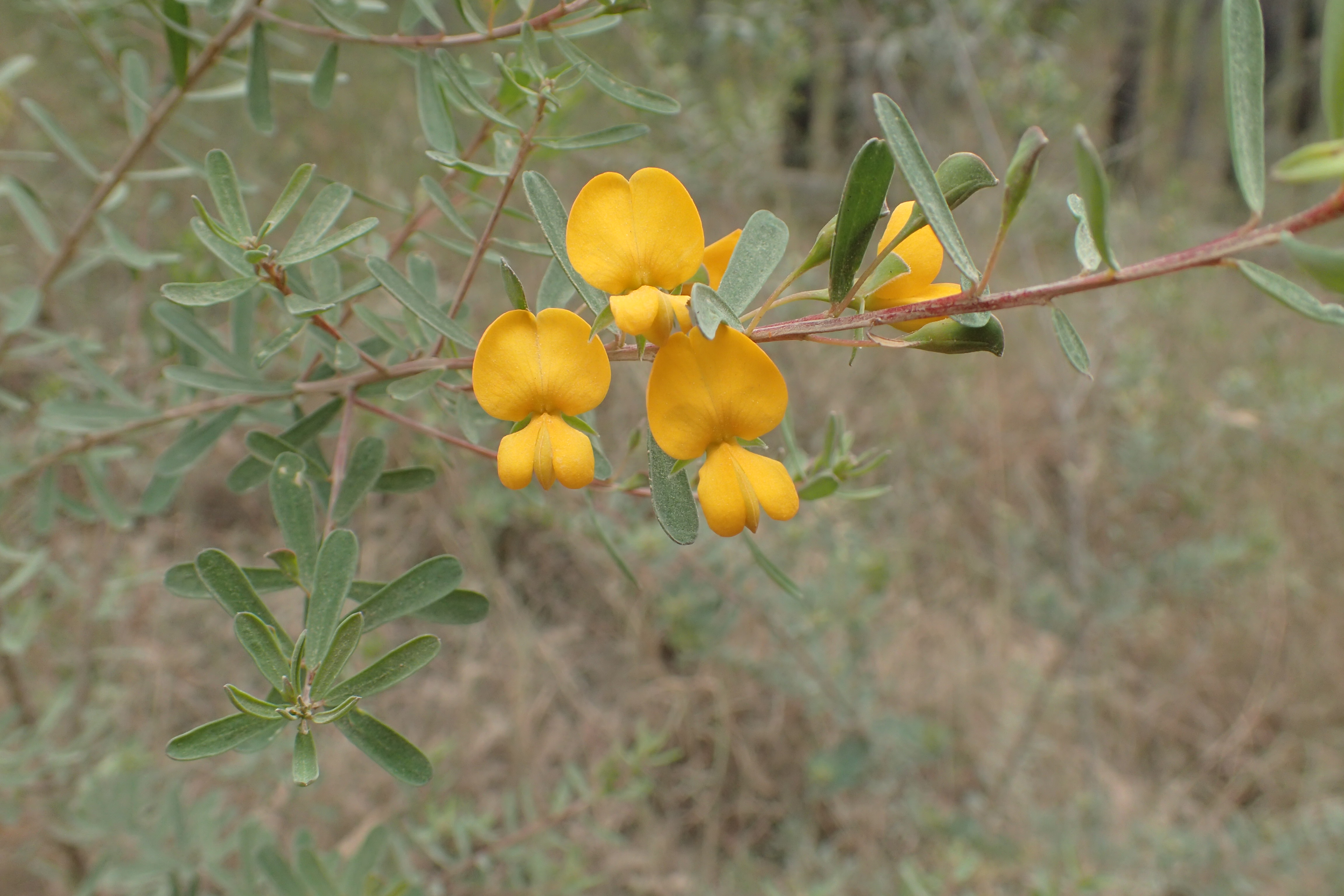
- Pultenaea euchila west of Corindi

Scientific classification
- Kingdom: Plantae
- Clade: Tracheophytes
- Clade: Angiosperms
- Clade: Eudicots
- Clade: Rosids
- Order: Fabales
- Family: Fabaceae
- Subfamily: Faboideae
- Genus: Pultenaea
- Species: P. euchila

Binomial name
- Pultenaea euchila DC.

= Pultenaea euchila =

Orange pultenaea

Species of flowering plant

Pultenaea euchila, commonly known as orange pultenaea, is a species of flowering plant in the family Fabaceae and is endemic to eastern Australia. It is an erect shrub with glabrous foliage, narrow egg-shaped leaves with the narrower end towards the base, and orange-coloured flowers arranged singly or in small groups near the ends of branchlets.

== Description ==
Pultenaea euchila is an erect, glabrous shrub with narrow egg-shaped leaves with the narrower end towards the base, 10–20 mm (0.39–0.79 in) long and 3–5 mm (0.12–0.20 in) wide with stipules 1–2 mm (0.039–0.079 in) long at the base. The upper surface of the leaves is paler than the lower side. The flowers are arranged near the ends of branchlets and are 10–15 mm (0.39–0.59 in) long on pedicels up to 10 mm (0.39 in) long with linear to egg-shaped bracteoles 1.5–3 mm (0.059–0.118 in) long attached near the base of the sepal tube. The sepals are 6–8 mm (0.24–0.31 in) long, the petals are orange, the ovary is glabrous and the fruit is a pod 8–9 mm (0.31–0.35 in) long.

== Taxonomy and naming ==
Pultenaea euchila was first formally described in 1825 by Augustin Pyramus de Candolle in his Prodromus Systematis Naturalis Regni Vegetabilis.

== Distribution and habitat ==
Orange pultenaea grows in near-coastal forests from Lake Macquarie in New South Wales to southern Queensland.
