= Acantholycosa oligerae =

Scientific classification
- Kingdom: Animalia
- Phylum: Arthropoda
- Subphylum: Chelicerata
- Class: Arachnida
- Order: Araneae
- Infraorder: Araneomorphae
- Family: Lycosidae
- Genus: Acantholycosa
- Species: A. oligerae

Binomial name
- Acantholycosa oligerae Marusik, Azarkina & Koponen, 2003

Species of spider

Acantholycosa oligerae is a species of wolf spider only known from Primorsky Krai, Russia.

This spider, up to 10 mm in length, is brown with a pale stripe down the middle of the carapace. In males the stripe is continued down the abdomen; in females the abdomen is unpatterned. The legs have pale rings in both sexes.
