= Mongolicosa gobiensis =

Scientific classification
- Kingdom: Animalia
- Phylum: Arthropoda
- Subphylum: Chelicerata
- Class: Arachnida
- Order: Araneae
- Infraorder: Araneomorphae
- Family: Lycosidae
- Genus: Mongolicosa
- Species: M. gobiensis

Binomial name
- Mongolicosa gobiensis Marusik, Azarkina & Koponen, 2003

Species of spider

Mongolicosa gobiensis is a species of wolf spider only known from a single female collected in Khürmen district, Ömnögovi Province, Mongolia.

This spider, 6.8 mm in length, has a blackish-brown carapace and a dark grey, sparsely hairy abdomen. The legs have pale banding.
