= Acantholycosa norvegica =

- Subadult female

Scientific classification
- Kingdom: Animalia
- Phylum: Arthropoda
- Subphylum: Chelicerata
- Class: Arachnida
- Order: Araneae
- Infraorder: Araneomorphae
- Family: Lycosidae
- Genus: Acantholycosa
- Species: A. norvegica

Binomial name
- Acantholycosa norvegica (Thorell, 1872)

Subspecies
- Acantholycosa norvegica sudetica (L. Koch, 1875) — Europe

Synonyms
- Lycosa norvegica Thorell, 1872

Species of spider

Acantholycosa norvegica is a species of wolf spider, family Lycosidae. It has a Palearctic distribution from Norway in the west to the Russian Far East in the east and south to northern Mongolia; there is an isolated population in central Europe. It has the widest range of all species in its genus.

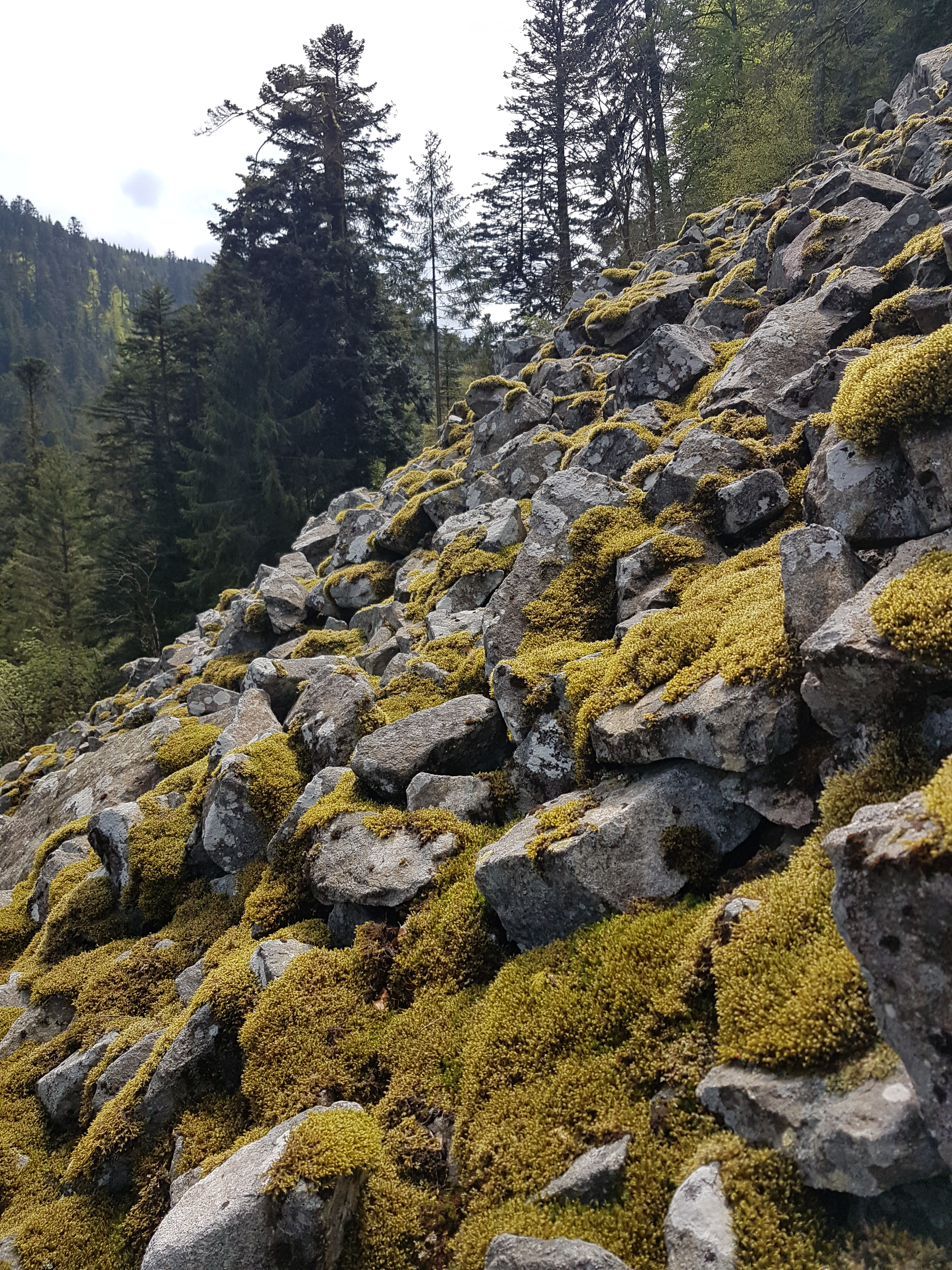
Habitat of A. norvegica in Vosges, eastern France

Males measure 6–8 mm (0.24–0.31 in) and females 7.5–10 mm (0.30–0.39 in) in total length.
