= Acantholycosa pedestris =

Scientific classification
- Kingdom: Animalia
- Phylum: Arthropoda
- Subphylum: Chelicerata
- Class: Arachnida
- Order: Araneae
- Infraorder: Araneomorphae
- Family: Lycosidae
- Genus: Acantholycosa
- Species: A. pedestris

Binomial name
- Acantholycosa pedestris (Simon, 1876)

Species of spider

Acantholycosa pedestris is a wolf spider species in the genus Acantholycosa found in Europe. It was first described by Eugène Simon, the French naturalist.
