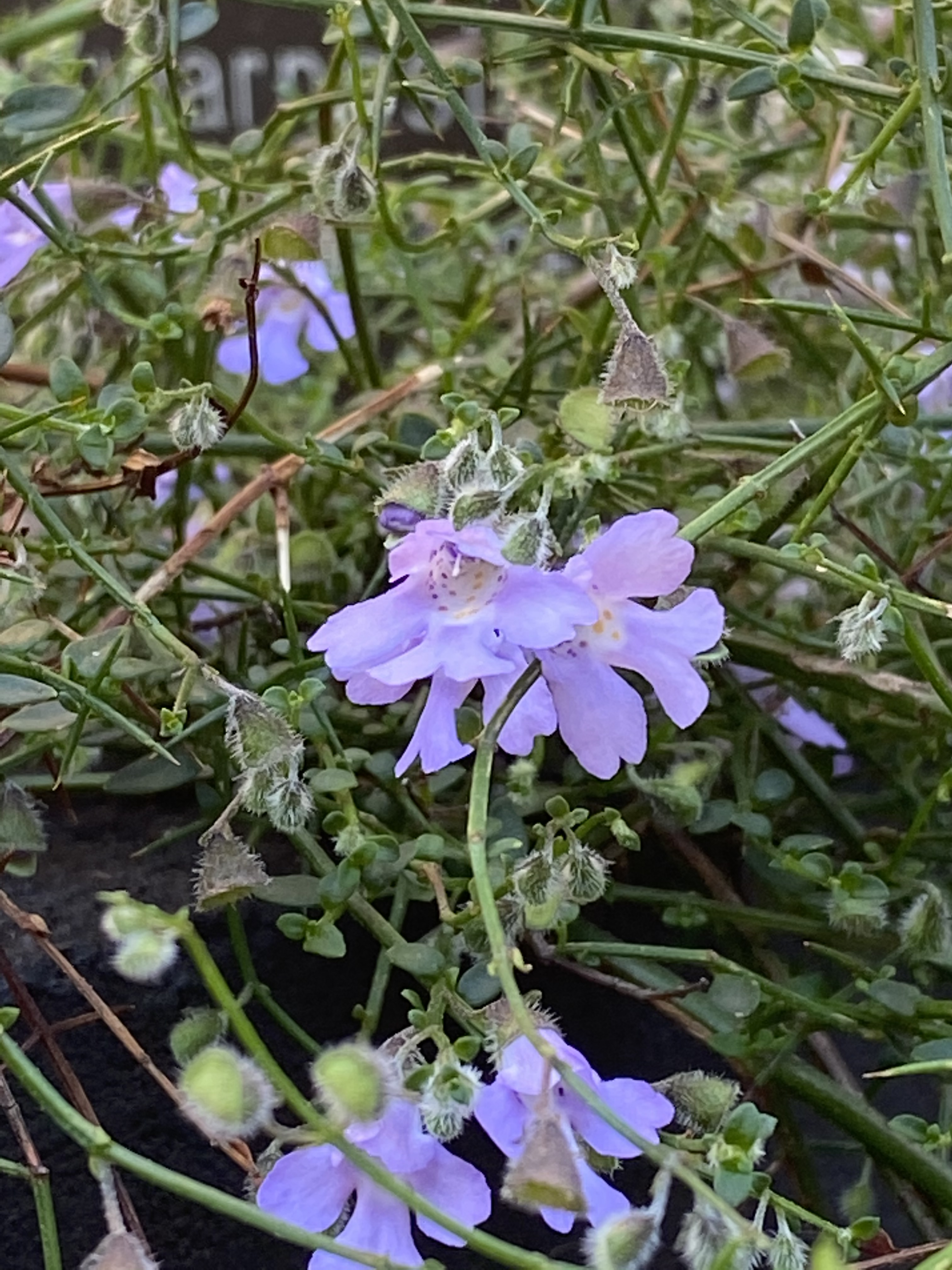
- Prostanthera spinosa ANBG Canberra

Scientific classification
- Kingdom: Plantae
- Clade: Tracheophytes
- Clade: Angiosperms
- Clade: Eudicots
- Clade: Asterids
- Order: Lamiales
- Family: Lamiaceae
- Genus: Prostanthera
- Species: P. spinosa

Binomial name
- Prostanthera spinosa F.Muell.
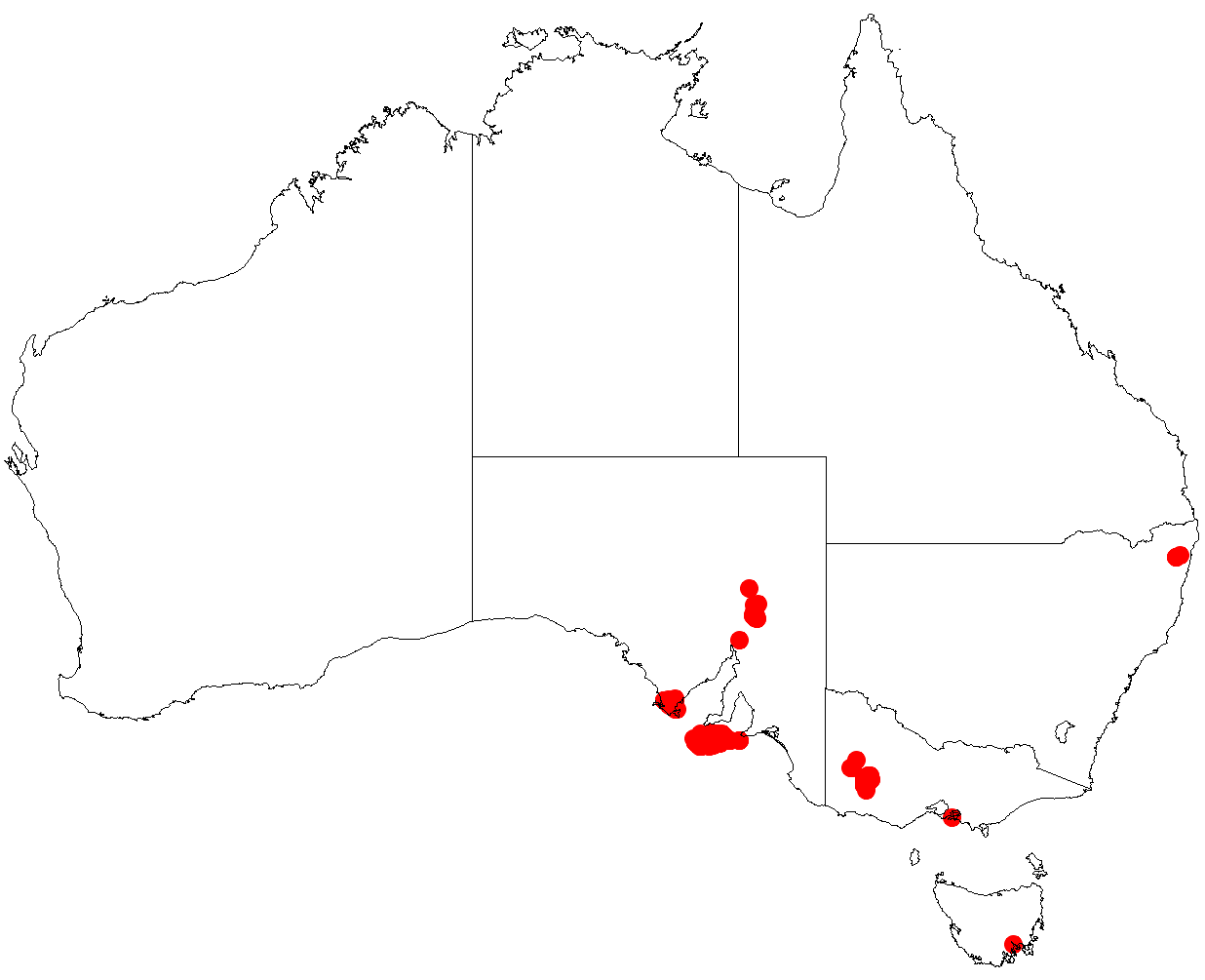
- Occurrence data from AVH

= Prostanthera spinosa =

Spiny mintbush

Species of plant

Prostanthera spinosa, commonly known as spiny mintbush, is a shrub that is endemic to south-eastern Australia. It has mauve to white flowers, spiny stems and aromatic foliage.

== Description ==
Prostanthera spinosa is a small, rigid, upright shrub with a scrambling habit mostly semi-prostrate, usually 0.2–2 m (7.9 in – 6 ft 6.7 in) high. The aromatic branches may be sparsely or moderately densely hairy with either upward spreading, straight or curled hairs 0.2–1 mm (0.0079–0.0394 in) long, or smooth with a few hairs at the nodes and consistent decussate spines 6–16 mm (0.24–0.63 in) long. The small leaves are thickly hairy or with occasional hairs, mostly on the petiole. The leaf is narrowly egg-shaped to broadly elliptic or trullate 1.5–6 mm (0.059–0.236 in) long, 1–3 mm (0.039–0.118 in) wide and the petiole 0.4–1 mm (0.016–0.039 in) long. The leaves are darker on the upper surface, paler on the underside, smooth or with firm, spreading hairs below on the midrib and profusely covered with glands. The leaf margins entire or slightly rolled under, underside veins obscure, ending in a rounded apex on a petiole 0.4–1 mm (0.016–0.039 in) long. Its flowers occur singly in the leaf axils, they are pale mauve to lilac to white with orange-brown streaks or spots on the lower inside petal that is 2–3 mm (0.079–0.118 in) long. The bracteoles remain to flower maturity are 0.9–2 mm (0.035–0.079 in) long and 0.2–0.3 mm (0.0079–0.0118 in) wide. Flowering occurs from July to December.

== Taxonomy and naming ==
The species was formally described in 1855 by Victorian Government Botanist Ferdinand von Mueller, based on plant material collected from "rocky declivities in springs near the Grampians". The description was published in Hooker's Journal of Botany and Kew Garden Miscellany. The specific epithet (spinosa) is derived from the Latin spinosus meaning "thorny".

== Distribution and habitat ==
Spiny mintbush occurs in the Grampians in rocky locations on shallow, sandy soils. In South Australia it is found growing near watercourses mostly in loamy-sand over limestone or sandstone.
