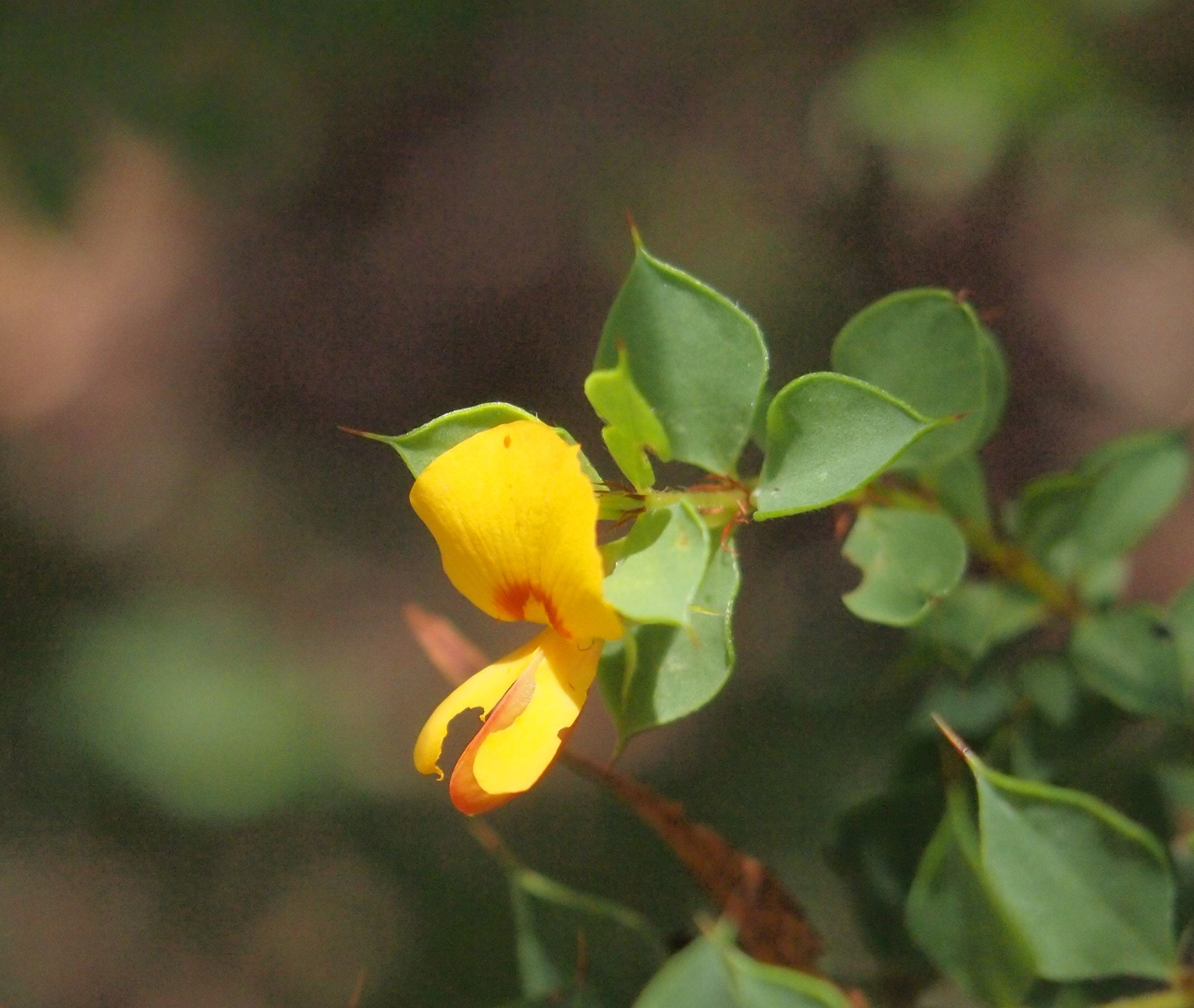

Scientific classification
- Kingdom: Plantae
- Clade: Tracheophytes
- Clade: Angiosperms
- Clade: Eudicots
- Clade: Rosids
- Order: Fabales
- Family: Fabaceae
- Subfamily: Faboideae
- Genus: Pultenaea
- Species: P. spinosa

Binomial name
- Pultenaea spinosa (DC.) H.B.Will.

Synonyms
- List: Euchilus cuspidatus F.Muell.; Gastrolobium hugelii Henfr.; Oxylobium spinosum DC.; Pultenaea cunninghamii (Benth.) F.Muell. nom. inval.; Pultenaea cunninghamii (Benth.) F.Muell. ex H.B.Will.; Pultenaea cunninghamii (Benth.) F.Muell. ex H.B.Will. var. cunninghamii; Pultenaea cunninghamii var. pubescens Benth. ex H.B.Will.; Pultenaea cunninghamii var. pubescens Benth. ex Ewart nom. illeg.; Pultenaea oxalidifolia Steud. nom. inval., nom. nud.; Pultenaea sp. 'Maryborough' (T.D.Stanley 87); Pultenaea sp. (Maryborough T.Stanley 87); Pultenaea sp. Hidden Valley (B.Jackes Dec 1976); Pultenaea ternata (F.Muell. ex Hannaford) F.Muell.; Pultenaea ternata var. cuspidata (F.Muell.) Benth.; Pultenaea ternata var. pubescens Benth.; Pultenaea ternata (F.Muell. ex Hannaford) F.Muell. var. ternata; Spadostyles cunninghamii Benth.; Spadostyles ternata F.Muell. ex Hannaford; Spadostylis cunninghami F.Muell. orth. var.; Spadostylis ternata F.Muell.

= Pultenaea spinosa =

Grey bush-pea

Species of plant

Pultenaea spinosa, commonly known as grey bush-pea or spiny bush-pea, is a species of flowering plant in the family Fabaceae and is endemic to south-eastern continental Australia. It is a low-lying to erect shrub with glabrous stems, egg-shaped to rhombic leaves, and yellow-orange and red, pea-like flowers.

== Description ==
Pultenaea spinosa is a low-lying to erect shrub that typically grows to a height of up to 3 m (9.8 ft) and has glabrous stems. The leaves are arranged in opposite pairs or in whorls of three, egg-shaped to rhombic, 4–15 mm (0.16–0.59 in) long, 1.5–2.5 mm (0.059–0.098 in) wide with triangular stipules 1–2 mm (0.039–0.079 in) long at the base and a sharp point on the tip. The flowers are arranged in loose groups near the ends of branches and are 7–15 mm (0.28–0.59 in) long, each flower on a pedicel 3–7 mm (0.12–0.28 in) long with glabrous bracteoles 2–4 mm (0.079–0.157 in) long attached at the base of the sepal tube. The sepals are 6–9 mm (0.24–0.35 in) long, the standard petal is yellow-orange with a red base and 6–14 mm (0.24–0.55 in) long, the wings yellow-orange and 5.5–14.2 mm (0.22–0.56 in) long, and the keel reddish-brown, yellow or orange and 5.8–12.5 mm (0.23–0.49 in) long. Flowering mainly occurs from September to November and the fruit is a pod 6–7 mm (0.24–0.28 in) long.

== Taxonomy ==
Grey bush-pea was first formally described in 1825 by Augustin Pyramus de Candolle who gave it the name Oxylobium spinosum in Prodromus Systematis Naturalis Regni Vegetabilis. In 1922, Herbert Bennett Williamson changed the name to Pultenaea spinosa in the Proceedings of the Royal Society of Victoria. The specific epithet (spinosa) means "spiny".

== Distribution and habitat ==
Pultenaea spinosa grows in forest in rocky sites in eastern Queensland south from the Leichhardt district, in eastern New South Wales, the Australian Capital Territory and north-eastern Victoria.
