= Pyrenecosa =

Scientific classification
- Kingdom: Animalia
- Phylum: Arthropoda
- Subphylum: Chelicerata
- Class: Arachnida
- Order: Araneae
- Infraorder: Araneomorphae
- Family: Lycosidae
- Genus: Pyrenecosa; Marusik, Azarkina & Koponen, 2004

Species
- Pyrenecosa pyrenaea (Simon, 1876) — France; Pyrenecosa rupicola (Dufour, 1821) — Spain, France, Switzerland; Pyrenecosa spinosa (Denis, 1938) — Andorra

Genus of spiders

Pyrenecosa is a wolf spider genus, with three European species.

== See also ==
- List of Lycosidae genera
