= Sibirocosa =

Scientific classification
- Kingdom: Animalia
- Phylum: Arthropoda
- Subphylum: Chelicerata
- Class: Arachnida
- Order: Araneae
- Infraorder: Araneomorphae
- Family: Lycosidae
- Genus: Sibirocosa; Marusik, Azarkina & Koponen, 2003

Species
- See list

Genus of spiders

Sibirocosa is a genus of wolf spiders containing seven species, all from Russia, mostly found from northeastern Siberia south to Primorsky Krai. Spiders of this genus are dark coloured and hairy with a body length of 5.25 - 7.25 mm.

== Species ==
- Sibirocosa kolymensis Marusik, Azarkina & Koponen, 2004 — Russia
- Sibirocosa koponeni Omelko & Marusik, 2013 — Russia
- Sibirocosa manchurica Marusik, Azarkina & Koponen, 2004 — Russia
- Sibirocosa nadolnyi Omelko & Marusik, 2013 — Russia
- Sibirocosa sibirica (Kulczynski, 1908) — Russia
- Sibirocosa subsolana (Kulczynski, 1907) — Russia
- Sibirocosa trilikauskasi Omelko & Marusik, 2013 — Russia
