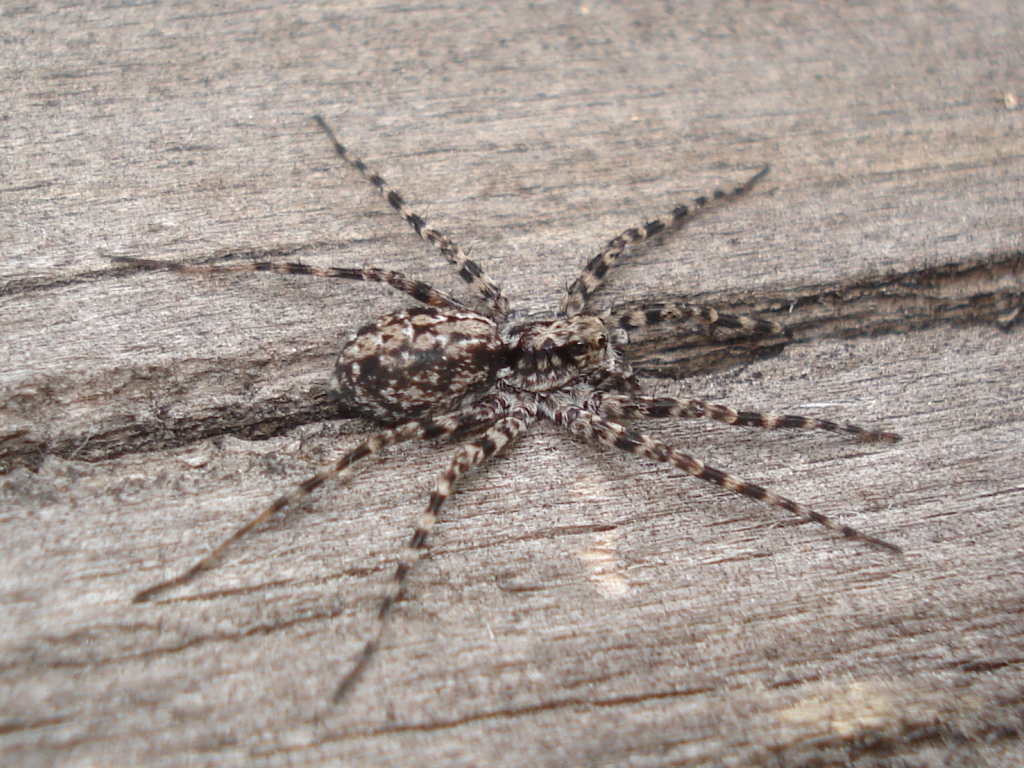
- Acantholycosa lignaria

Scientific classification
- Kingdom: Animalia
- Phylum: Arthropoda
- Subphylum: Chelicerata
- Class: Arachnida
- Order: Araneae
- Infraorder: Araneomorphae
- Family: Lycosidae
- Genus: Acantholycosa; Dahl, 1908

Species
- 38 species (see text)

= Acantholycosa =

Genus of spiders

Acantholycosa is a genus of wolf spiders, family Lycosidae. Members of this genus can be distinguished from closely related genera by the presence of more than three pairs of ventral tibial spines on each front leg. All are found in Asia and Europe with the exception of Acantholycosa solituda, found in North America.

Acantholycosa norvegica, the most widespread species in the genus.

== Description ==
Acantholycosa measure 6–11 mm (0.24–0.43 in) in total length. Colouration ranges from moderately light to almost black; most are relatively patternless. The legs are relatively long.

== Species ==
There are 38 accepted species:

- Acantholycosa aborigenica Zyuzin & Marusik, 1988
- Acantholycosa altaiensis Marusik, Azarkina & Koponen, 2004
- Acantholycosa azarkinae Marusik & Omelko, 2011
- Acantholycosa azheganovae (Lobanova, 1978)
- Acantholycosa azyuzini Marusik, Hippa & Koponen, 1996
- Acantholycosa dudkoromani Marusik, Azarkina & Koponen, 2004
- Acantholycosa dudkorum Marusik, Azarkina & Koponen, 2004
- Acantholycosa irinae Fomichev & Omelko, 2020
- Acantholycosa katunensis Marusik, Azarkina & Koponen, 2004
- Acantholycosa khakassica Marusik, Azarkina & Koponen, 2004
- Acantholycosa kronestedti Fomichev & Marusik, 2018
- Acantholycosa kulikovi Fomichev, 2021
- Acantholycosa levinae Marusik, Azarkina & Koponen, 2004
- Acantholycosa lignaria (Clerck, 1757)
- Acantholycosa logunovi Marusik, Azarkina & Koponen, 2004
- Acantholycosa marusiki Fomichev & Omelko, 2020
- Acantholycosa mordkovitchi Marusik, Azarkina & Koponen, 2004
- Acantholycosa norvegica (Thorell, 1872)
- Acantholycosa oligerae Marusik, Azarkina & Koponen, 2004
- Acantholycosa paraplumalis Marusik, Azarkina & Koponen, 2004
- Acantholycosa pedestris (Simon, 1876)
- Acantholycosa petrophila Marusik, Azarkina & Koponen, 2004
- Acantholycosa plumalis Marusik, Azarkina & Koponen, 2004
- Acantholycosa sayanensis Marusik, Azarkina & Koponen, 2004
- Acantholycosa sergeevi Fomichev, 2021
- Acantholycosa sidorovi Fomichev, 2021
- Acantholycosa solituda (H. W. Levi & L. R. Levi, 1951)
- Acantholycosa spinembolus Marusik, Azarkina & Koponen, 2004
- Acantholycosa sterneri (Marusik, 1993)
- Acantholycosa sundukovi Marusik, Azarkina & Koponen, 2004
- Acantholycosa tarbagataica Marusik & Logunov, 2011
- Acantholycosa vahterae Fomichev & Marusik, 2018
- Acantholycosa valeriae Omelko, Komisarenko & Marusik, 2016
- Acantholycosa voronoii Omelko & Fomichev, 2022
- Acantholycosa zang X. Y. Zhang, Z. S. Zhang & Wang, 2025
- Acantholycosa zhangi X. Y. Zhang, Z. S. Zhang & Wang, 2025
- Acantholycosa zinchenkoi Marusik, Azarkina & Koponen, 2004
- Acantholycosa zonsteini Marusik & Omelko, 2017
